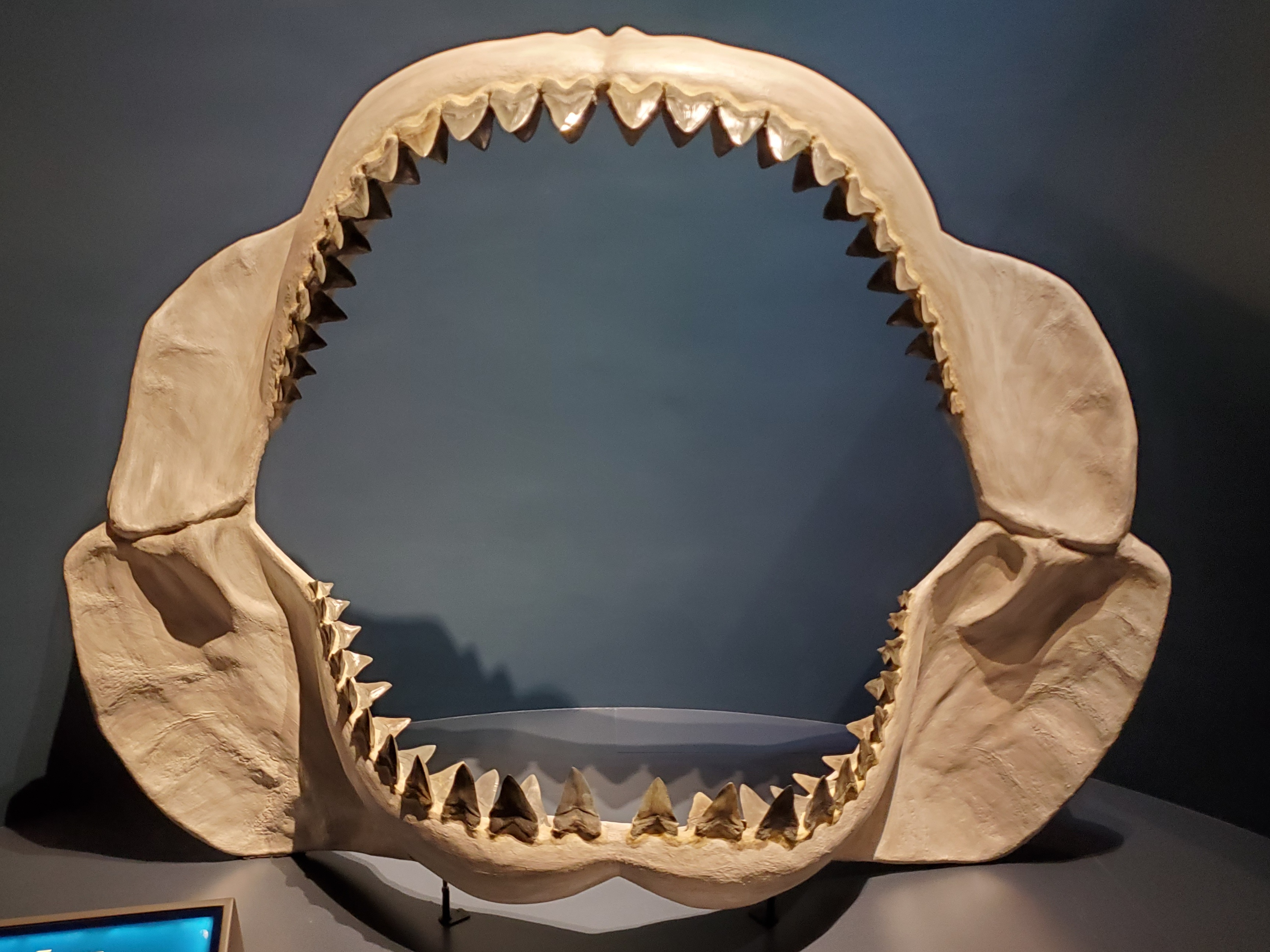
- Model of Megalodon jaws at the Tellus Science Museum

Scientific classification
- Kingdom: Animalia
- Phylum: Chordata
- Class: Chondrichthyes
- Subclass: Elasmobranchii
- Division: Selachii
- Order: Lamniformes
- Family: †Otodontidae
- Genus: †Otodus
- Species: †O. megalodon

Binomial name
- †Otodus megalodon (Agassiz, 1835)

Synonyms
- List of synonyms: Genus Carcharias; C. giganteus; C. grosseserratus; C. incidens; C. macrodon; C. megalodon; C. mexicanus; C. polygurus; C. polygyrus; C. productus; C. (Prionodon) incidens Genus Carcharocles; C. subauriculatus; C. megalodon; C. megalodon megalodon; C. productus Genus Carcharodon; C. arcuatus; C. branneri; C. brevis; C. costae; C. crassidens; C. crassirhadix; C. crassus; C. gibbesi; C. gigas; C. helveticus; C. humilis; C. intermedius; C. latissimus; C. leviathan; C. megalodon; C. megalodon indica; C. megalodon megalodon; C. megalodon polygyra; C. megalodon productus; C. megalodon siculus; C. megalodon yamanarii; C. morricei; C. polygurus; C. polygyrus; C. productus; C. quenstedti; C. rectidens; C. rectideus; C. semiserratus; C. subauriculatus; C. tumidissimus; C. turicensis Genus Megaselachus; M. arcuatus; M. auriculatus falciformis; M. branneri; M. brevis; M. crassidens; M. crassirhadix; M. crassus; M. gigas; M. heterodon; M. humilis; M. incidens; M. leviathan; M. megalodon; M. megalodon indicus; M. polygyrus; M. productus; M. rectidens; M. semiserratus; M. subauriculatus Genus Procarcharodon; P. megalodon; P. megalodon megalodon Genus Otodus; O. (Megaselachus) megalodon Genus Selache; S. manzonii

= Megalodon =

Megalodon Temporal range: Early Miocene to Early Pliocene (Aquitanian–Zanclean), c. 23–3.58 Ma

Extinct giant shark species

Otodus megalodon (/ˈmɛɡələdɒn/ MEG-əl-ə-don; meaning "big tooth"), commonly known as megalodon, is an extinct species of giant mackerel shark that lived approximately 23 to 3.58 million years ago (Mya), from the Early Miocene to the Early Pliocene epochs. It was once considered a member of the family Lamnidae and a close relative of the great white shark (Carcharodon carcharias), but is now classified in the extinct family Otodontidae, which diverged from the lineage leading to modern great white sharks during the Early Cretaceous.

Megalodon is regarded as one of the largest and most powerful predators to have ever lived, although its fragmentary fossil record leaves its appearance and maximum size uncertain. Scientists have debated whether its body was more robust or elongated than that of modern lamniform sharks. Proposed maximum length estimates range from 14.2 to 24.3 m (47 to 80 ft), while the estimated modal length across juveniles and adults is approximately 10.5 m (34 ft). Its thick, robust teeth were adapted for grasping prey and breaking bone, and its large jaws are thought to have exerted a bite force of 108,500 to 182,200 newtons (24,390 to 40,960 lbf).

Megalodon likely played a significant role in shaping marine ecosystems and had a cosmopolitan distribution, as indicated by the fossil record. It probably preyed on large marine animals, including whales, seals and sea turtles, while juveniles inhabited warm coastal waters and fed on fish and small whales. Unlike great white sharks, which often attack prey from beneath, megalodon may have used its powerful jaws to crush the thoracic region of its prey, damaging the heart and lungs.

The animal faced competition from whale-eating cetaceans, such as Livyatan and other macroraptorial sperm whales and possibly smaller ancestral killer whales (Orcinus), although the inclusion of early Orcinus as a direct competitor is uncertain, as species such as Orcinus citoniensis were likely adapted for feeding on small fish and cephalopods rather than large marine mammals. As the shark preferred warmer waters, it is thought that oceanic cooling associated with the onset of the ice ages, coupled with the lowering of sea levels and resulting loss of suitable nursery areas, may have contributed to its decline. A reduction in the diversity of baleen whales and a shift in their distribution toward polar regions may have reduced megalodon's primary food source. The shark's extinction coincides with a gigantism trend in baleen whales.

== Classification ==
=== Prescientific and early research history ===
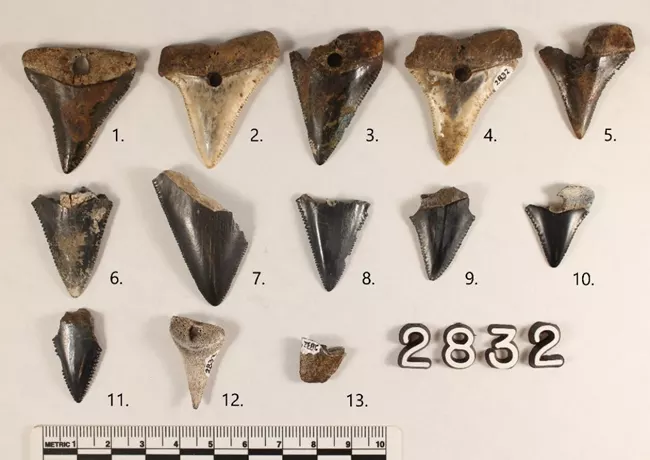
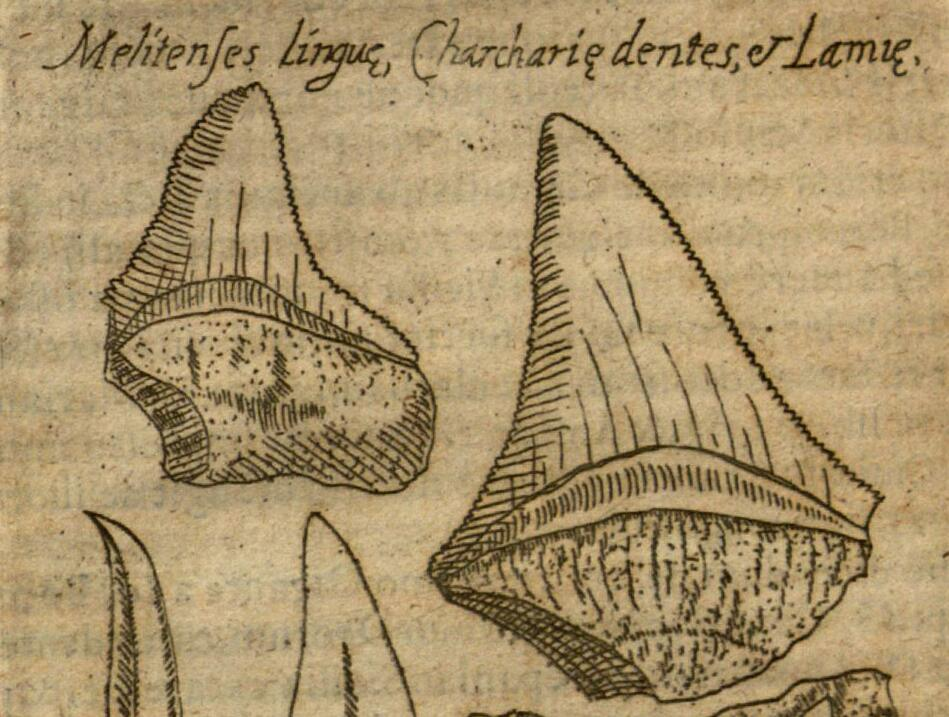
Left image: Chesapeake megalodon tooth (Fig. 7) excavated from a Hopewell burial mound. Right image: Colonna's 1616 comparison of a megalodon (top left) and great white tooth (right).

Megalodon teeth have been excavated and used since ancient times. They were a valued artifact amongst pre-Columbian cultures in the Americas for their large sizes and serrated blades, from which they were modified into projectile points, knives, jewelry, and funeral accessories. At least some, such as the Sitio Conte societies of Panama, seemed to have used them primarily for ceremonial purposes. Mining of megalodon teeth by the Algonquian peoples in the Chesapeake Bay and their selective trade with the Adena culture in Ohio occurred as early as 430 BC. The earliest written account of megalodon teeth was by Pliny the Elder in an AD 73 volume of Historia Naturalis, who described them as resembling petrified human tongues that Roman folklorists believed to have fallen from the sky during lunar eclipses and called them glossopetrae ("tongue stones"). The purported tongues were later thought in a 12th-century Maltese tradition to have belonged to serpents that Paul the Apostle turned to stone while shipwrecked there, and were given antivenom powers by the saint. Glossopetrae reappeared throughout Europe in late 13th to 16th century literature, ascribed with more supernatural properties that cured a wider variety of poisons. Use of megalodon teeth for this purpose became widespread among medieval and Renaissance nobility, who fashioned them into protective amulets and tableware to purportedly detoxify poisoned liquids or bodies that touched the stones. By the 16th century, teeth were directly consumed as ingredients of European-made Goa stones.

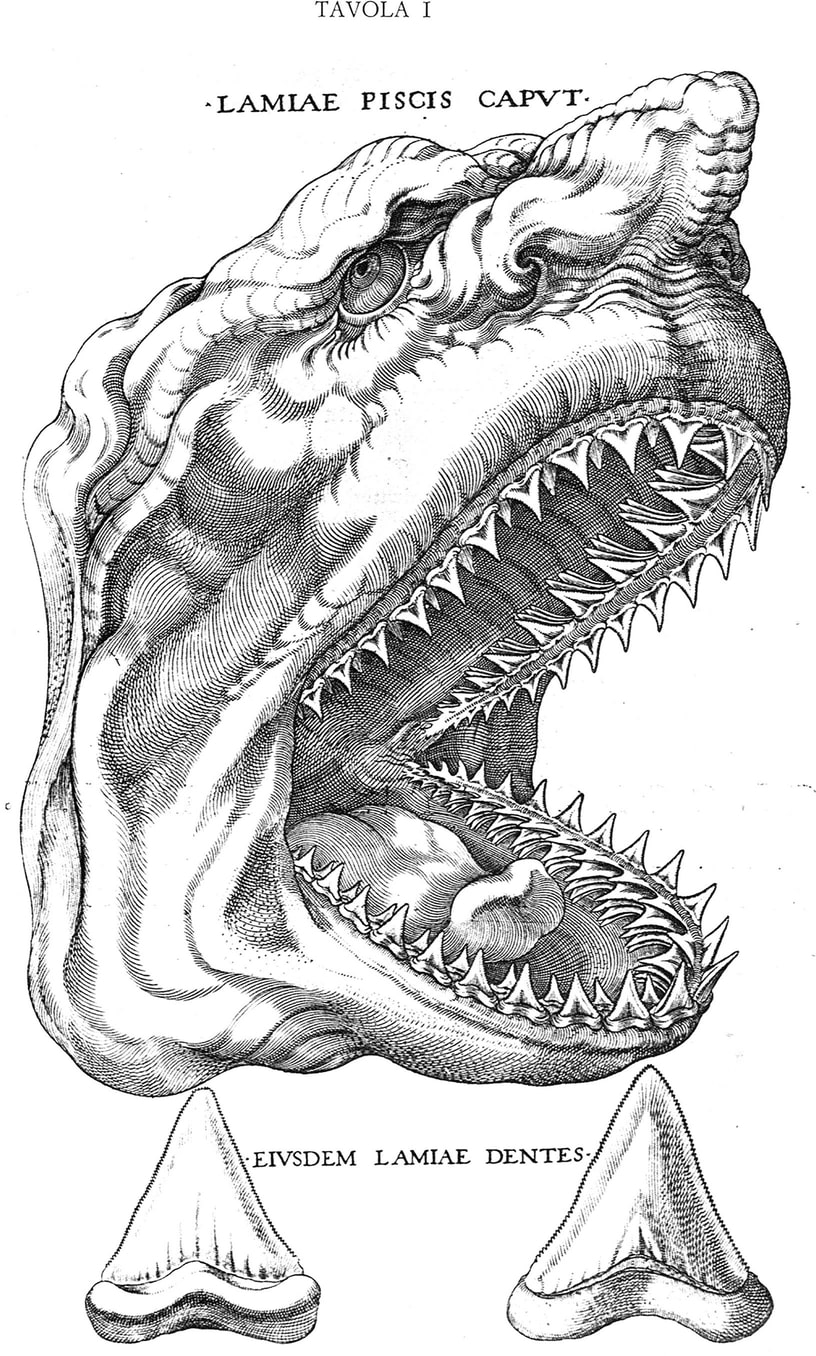
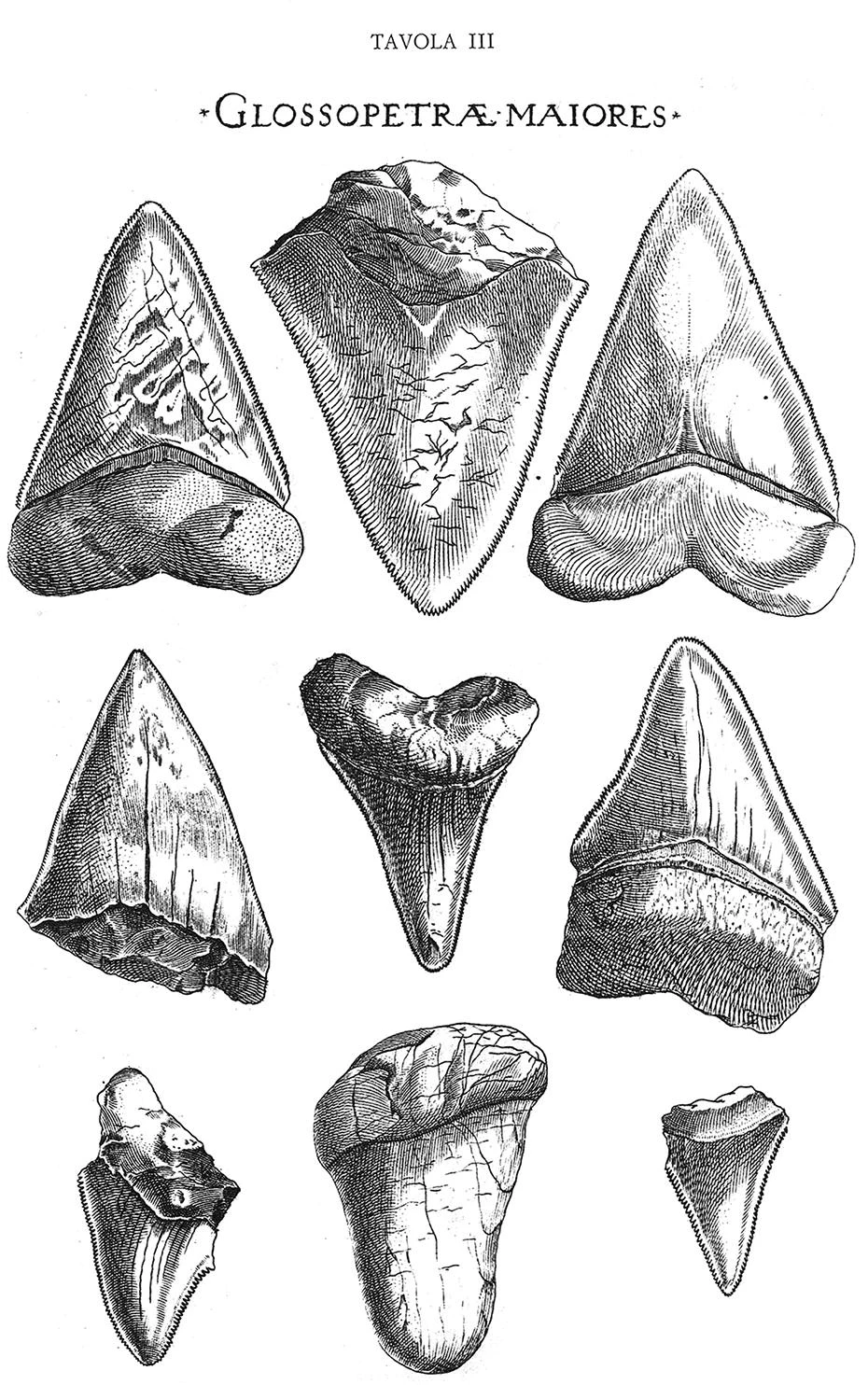
Mercati's depictions of a great white's head and teeth (left) and fossil megalodon and great white teeth (right), reused by Steensen in 1667

The true nature of the glossopetrae as shark's teeth was held by some since at least 1554, when cosmographer André Thevet described it as hearsay, although he did not believe it. The earliest scientific argument for this view was made by Italian naturalist Fabio Colonna, who in 1616 published an illustration of a Maltese megalodon tooth alongside a great white shark's and noted their striking similarities. He argued that the former and its likenesses were not petrified serpent's tongues but actually the teeth of similar sharks that washed up on shore. Colonna supported this thesis through an experiment of burning glossopetrae samples, from which he observed carbon residue he interpreted as proving an organic origin. However, interpretation of the stones as shark's teeth remained widely unaccepted. This was in part due to the inability to explain how some of them are found far from the sea. The shark tooth argument was academically raised again during the late 17th century by English scientists Robert Hooke, John Ray, and Danish naturalist Niels Steensen (Latinized Nicholas Steno). Steensen's argument in particular is most recognized as inferred from his dissection of the head of a great white caught in 1666. His 1667 report depicted engravings of a shark's head and megalodon teeth that became especially iconic. However, the illustrated head was not actually the head that Steensen dissected, nor were the fossil teeth illustrated by him. Both engravings were originally commissioned in the 1590s by Papal physician Michele Mercati, who also had in possession the head of a great white, for his book Metallotheca. The work remained unpublished in Steensen's time due to Mercati's premature death, and the former reused the two illustrations per suggestion by Carlo Roberto Dati, who thought a depiction of the actual dissected shark was unsuitable for readers. Steensen also stood out in pioneering a stratigraphic explanation for how similar stones appeared further inland. He observed that rock layers bearing megalodon teeth contained marine sediments and hypothesized that these layers correlated to a period of flood that was later covered by terrestrial layers and uplifted by geologic activity.

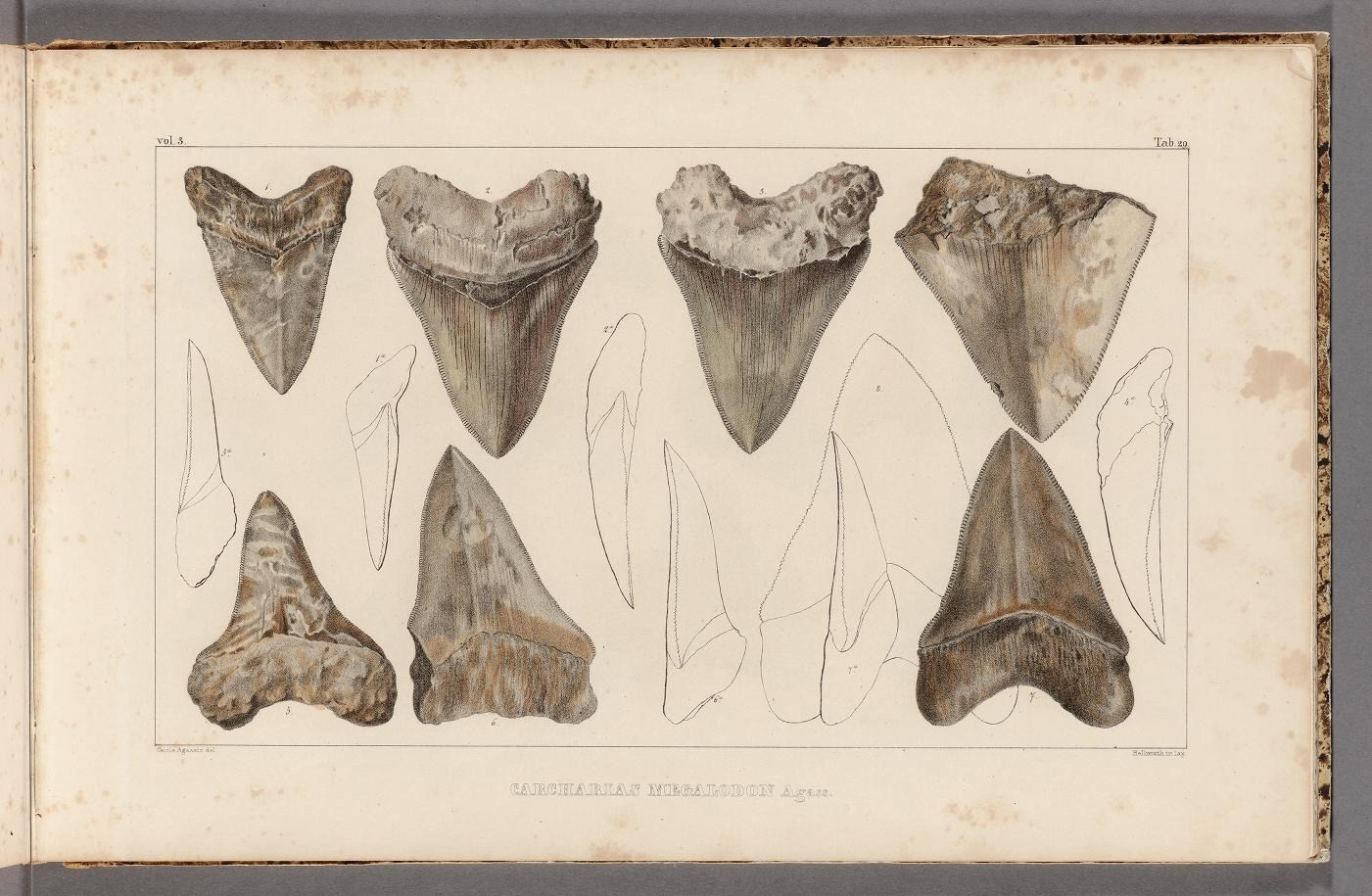
Holotype tooth (Fig. 2–3) in Agassiz (1835), cataloged as TE-PLI 18

Swiss naturalist Louis Agassiz gave megalodon its scientific name in his seminal 1833–1843 work Recherches sur les poissons fossiles (Research on fossil fish). He named it Carcharias megalodon in an 1835 illustration of the holotype and additional teeth, congeneric with the modern sand tiger shark. The specific name is a portmanteau of the Ancient Greek words μεγάλος (megálos, meaning "big") and ὀδών (odṓn, meaning "tooth"), combined meaning "big tooth". Agassiz referenced the name as early as 1832, but because specimens were not referenced they are not taxonomically recognized uses. Formal description of the species was published in an 1843 volume, where Agassiz revised the name to Carcharodon megalodon as its teeth were far too large for the former genus and more like those of the great white shark. He also erroneously identified several megalodon teeth as belonging to additional species eventually named Carcharodon rectidens, Carcharodon subauriculatus, Carcharodon productus, and Carcharodon polygurus. Because Carcharodon megalodon appeared first in the 1835 illustration, the remaining names are considered junior synonyms under the principle of priority.

=== Evolution ===
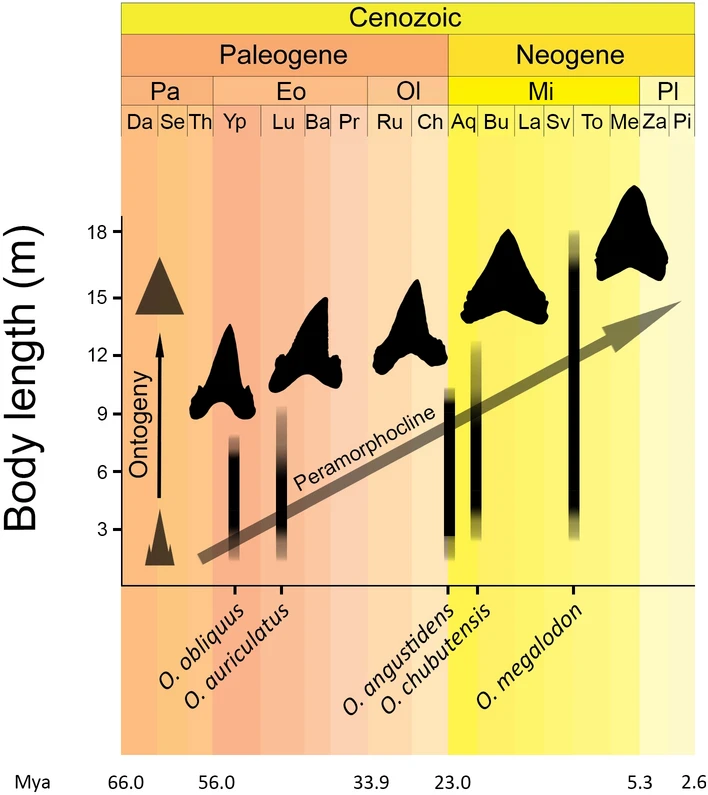
Diagram of the chronospecies evolution of megalodon

While the earliest megalodon remains have been reported from the Late Oligocene, around 28 million years ago (Mya), is disagreement as to when it appeared, with dates ranging to as young as 16 Mya. It has been thought that megalodon became extinct around the end of the Pliocene, about 2.6 Mya; claims of Pleistocene megalodon teeth, younger than 2.6 million years old, are considered unreliable. A 2019 assessment moves the extinction date back to earlier in the Pliocene, 3.6 Mya.

Megalodon is considered to be a member of the family Otodontidae, genus Otodus, as opposed to its previous classification into Lamnidae, genus Carcharodon. Megalodon's classification into Carcharodon was due to dental similarity with the great white shark, but most authors believe that this is due to convergent evolution. In this model, the great white shark is more closely related to the extinct broad-toothed mako (Cosmopolitodus hastalis) than to megalodon, as evidenced by more similar dentition in those two sharks; megalodon teeth have much finer serrations than great white shark teeth. The great white shark is more closely related to the mako sharks (Isurus spp.), with a common ancestor around 4 Mya. Proponents of the former model, wherein megalodon and the great white shark are more closely related, argue that the differences between their dentition are minute and obscure.

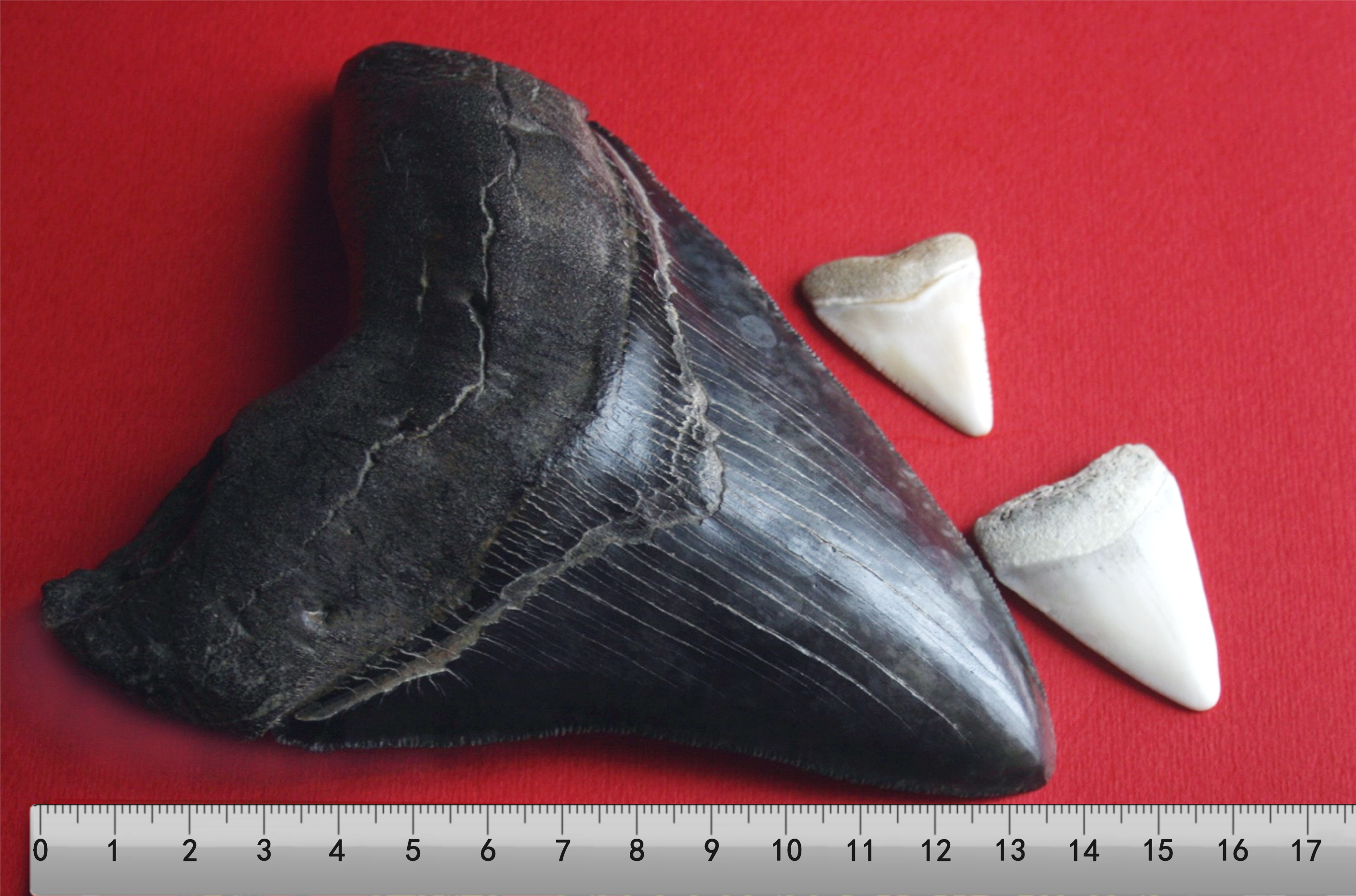
Megalodon tooth with two great white shark teeth

The genus Carcharocles contains four species: C. auriculatus, C. angustidens, C. chubutensis, and C. megalodon. The evolution of this lineage is characterized by the increase of serrations, the widening of the crown, the development of a more triangular shape, and the disappearance of the lateral cusps. The evolution in tooth morphology reflects a shift in predation tactics from a tearing-grasping bite to a cutting bite, likely reflecting a shift in prey choice from fish to cetaceans. Lateral cusplets were finally lost in a gradual process that took roughly 12 million years during the transition between C. chubutensis and C. megalodon. The genus was proposed by D. S. Jordan and H. Hannibal in 1923 to contain C. auriculatus. In the 1980s, megalodon was assigned to Carcharocles. Before this, in 1960, the genus Procarcharodon was erected by French ichthyologist Edgard Casier, which included those four sharks and was considered separate from the great white shark. It is since considered a junior synonym of Carcharocles. The genus Palaeocarcharodon was erected alongside Procarcharodon to represent the beginning of the lineage, and, in the model wherein megalodon and the great white shark are closely related, their last common ancestor. It is believed to be an evolutionary dead-end and unrelated to the Carcharocles sharks by authors who reject that model.

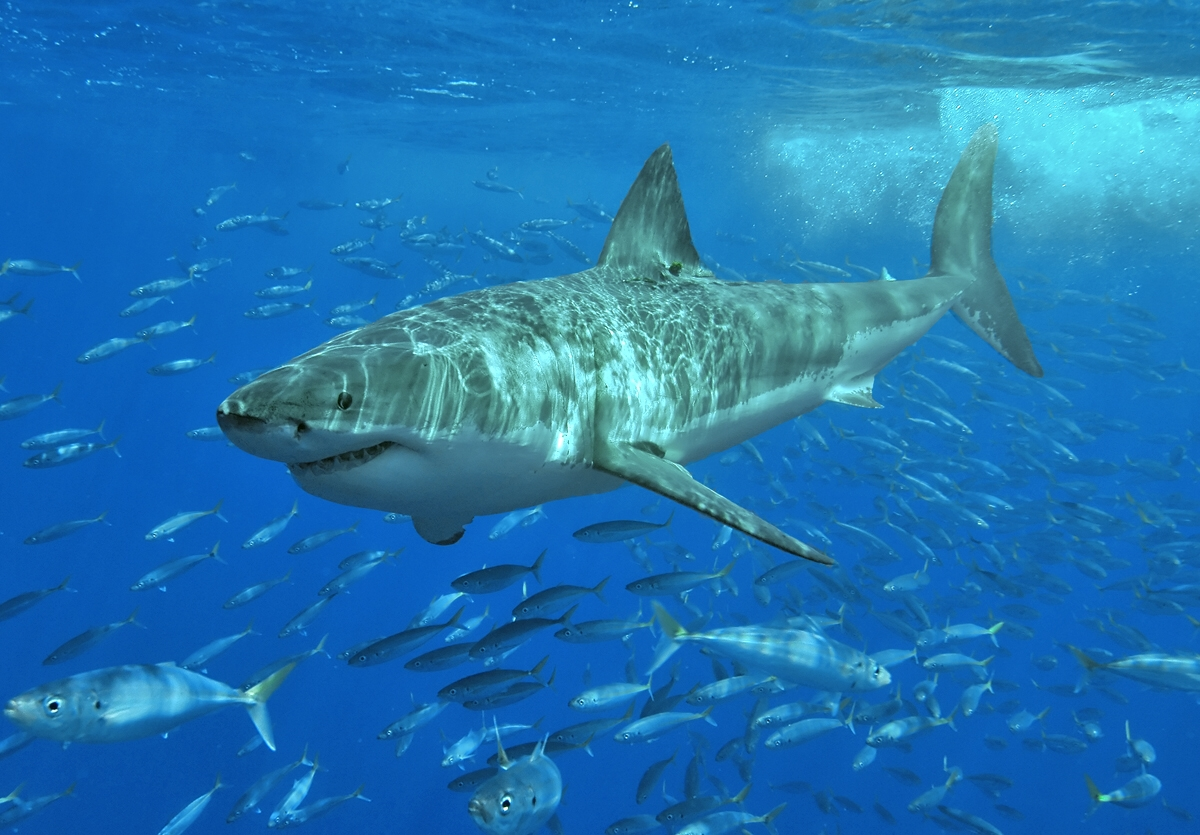
The great white shark (Carcharodon carcharias) and megalodon were previously thought to be close relatives.

Another model of the evolution of this genus, also proposed by Casier in 1960, is that the direct ancestor of the Carcharocles is the shark Otodus obliquus, which lived from the Paleocene through the Miocene epochs, 60 to 13 Mya. The genus Otodus is ultimately derived from Cretolamna, a shark from the Cretaceous period. In this model, O. obliquus evolved into O. aksuaticus, which evolved into C. auriculatus, and then into C. angustidens, and then into C. chubutensis, and then finally into C. megalodon.

Another model of the evolution of Carcharocles, proposed in 2001 by paleontologist Michael Benton, is that the three other species are actually a single species of shark that gradually changed over time between the Paleocene and the Pliocene, making it a chronospecies. Some authors suggest that C. auriculatus, C. angustidens, and C. chubutensis should be classified as a single species in the genus Otodus, leaving C. megalodon the sole member of Carcharocles.

The genus Carcharocles may be invalid, and the shark may actually belong in the genus Otodus, making it Otodus megalodon. A 1974 study on Paleogene sharks by Henri Cappetta erected the subgenus Megaselachus, classifying the shark as Otodus (Megaselachus) megalodon, along with O. (M.) chubutensis. A 2006 review of Chondrichthyes elevated Megaselachus to genus, and classified the sharks as Megaselachus megalodon and M. chubutensis. The discovery of fossils assigned to the genus Megalolamna in 2016 led to a re-evaluation of Otodus, which concluded that it is paraphyletic, that is, it consists of a last common ancestor but it does not include all of its descendants. The inclusion of the Carcharocles sharks in Otodus would make it monophyletic, with the sister clade being Megalolamna.

The cladogram below represents the hypothetical relationships between megalodon and other sharks, including the great white shark. Modified from Shimada et al. (2016), Ehret et al., (2009), and the findings of Siversson et al. (2015).

- Lamniformes
  - - †Otodontidae
      - †Kenolamna gunsoni
      - - - †Cretalamna appendiculata
          - †Cretalamna aschersoni
        - - †Megalolamna paradoxodon
          - - †Otodus obliquus
            - †Otodus megalodon
    - Lamnidae
      - Shortfin mako
      - Great white shark

== Biology ==
=== Appearance ===
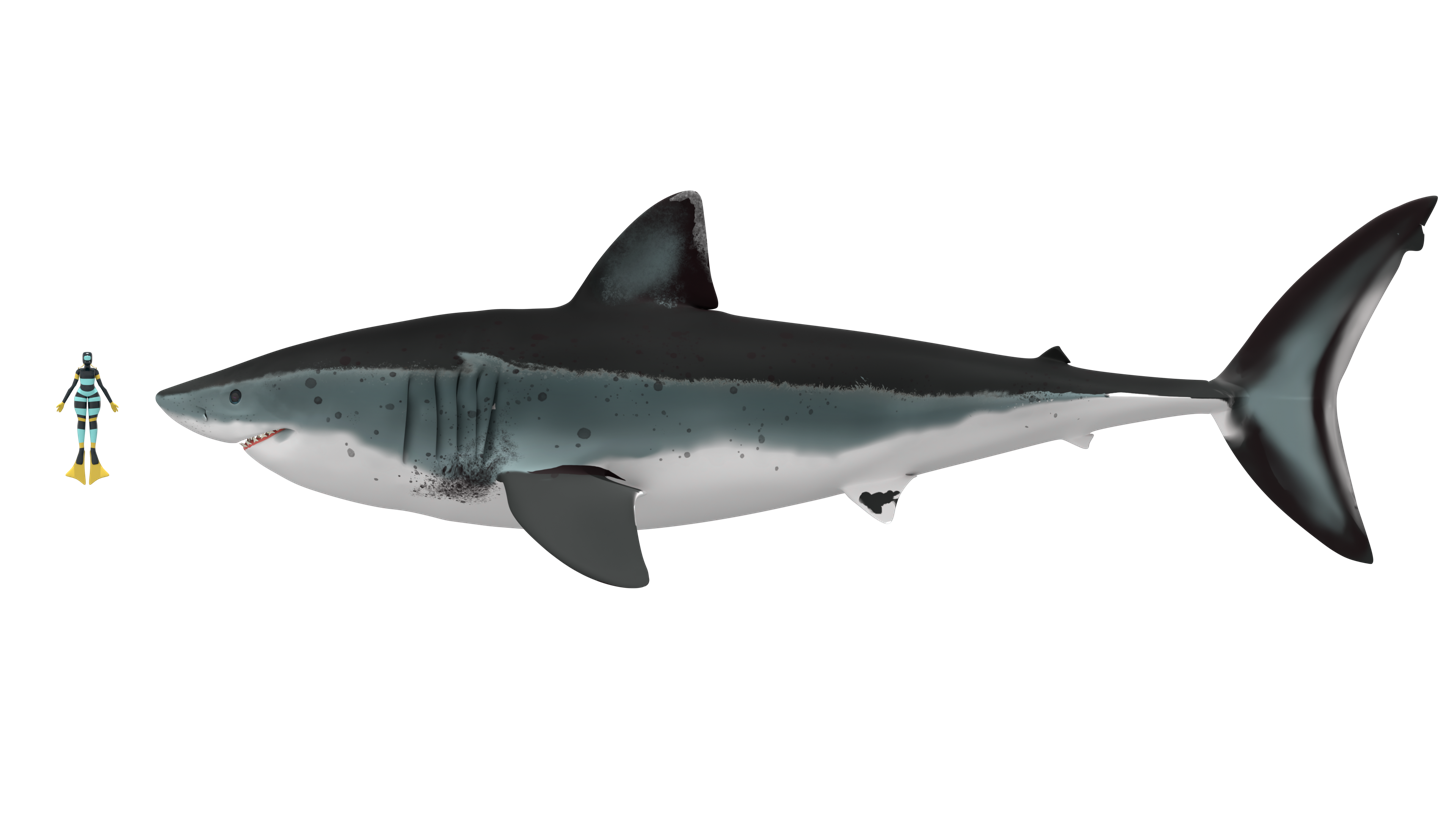
Lateral view of an Otodus megalodon restoration based on Cretalamna and modern lamnids

One interpretation on how megalodon appeared was that it was a robust-looking shark, and may have had a similar build to the great white shark. The jaws may have been blunter and wider than the great white, and the fins would have also been similar in shape, though thicker due to its size. It may have had a pig-eyed appearance, in that it had small, deep-set eyes.

Another interpretation is that megalodon bore a similarity to the whale shark (Rhincodon typus) or the basking shark (Cetorhinus maximus). The tail fin would have been crescent-shaped, the anal fin and second dorsal fin would have been small, and there would have been a caudal keel present on either side of the tail fin (on the caudal peduncle). This build is common in other large aquatic animals, such as whales, tuna, and other sharks, in order to reduce drag. The head shape can vary between species as most of the drag-reducing adaptations are toward the tail-end of the animal.

It was suggested in 2024 that megalodon had a more elongated body plan than previously thought. Shimada et al. (2025) also supported this hypothesis based on comparing the proportions of the neurocranium and caudal fin relative to its trunk to those of other laminforms (excluding goblin sharks and thresher sharks). They estimated that the maximum body length of megalodon would have been significantly longer than previously published estimates.

In 2023, Shimada and colleagues reported the associated set of megalodon remains found with placoid scales, which are 0.3 to 0.8 millimetres (0.012 to 0.031 in) in maximum width, and have broadly spaced keels. The quantitative relationship of the distance between each keel and the reported maximum cruising speeds of modern sharks were consistent with the hypothesis that megalodon was regionally endothermic but generally not a fast swimmer, though it may have been capable of occasional burst swimming to capture prey.

=== Size ===
Size comparison of the great white and whale shark to estimates for megalodon

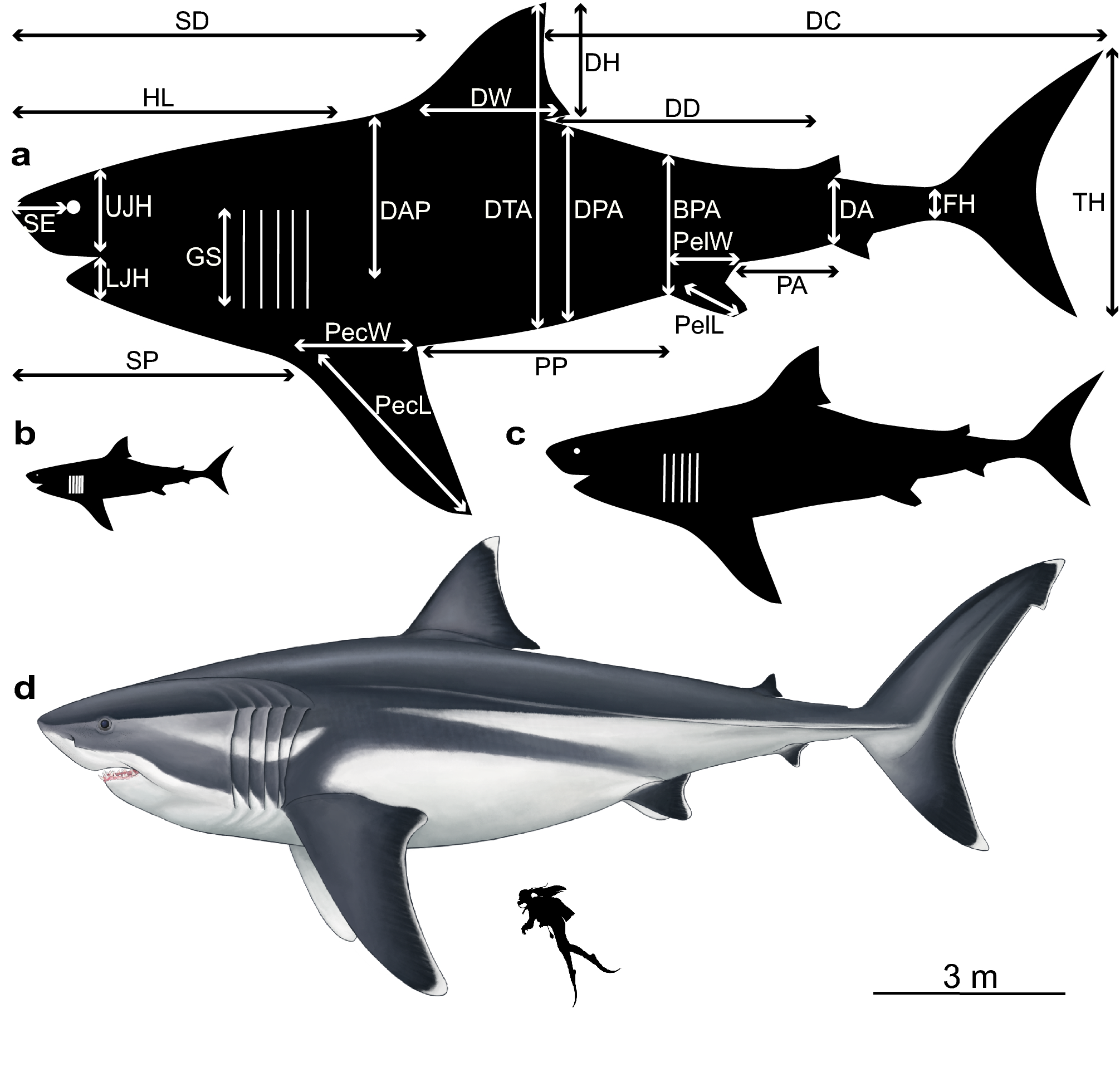
Proportions of megalodon at lengths of 3 m (10 ft), 8 m (26 ft), and 16 m (52 ft), extrapolated from extant relatives, with a 1.65 m (5 ft 5 in) diver

Theorized size variation of O. megalodon with individuals of 23 m (75 ft), 18.6 m (61 ft), 15 m (49 ft) adults and a 10 m (33 ft) juvenile

Due to fragmentary remains, there have been many contradictory size estimates for megalodon, as they can only be drawn from fossil teeth and vertebrae. The great white shark has been the basis of reconstruction and size estimation, as it is regarded as the best analogue to megalodon. Several total length estimation methods have been produced from comparing megalodon teeth and vertebrae to those of the great white.

Size estimates of megalodon vary depending on the method used and the hypothesis of its body plan, with maximum total length estimates ranging from 14.2–24.3 meters (47–80 ft). Gottfried (1996) suggested that mature male megalodon may have had a body mass of 12.6 to 33.9 t (13.9 to 37.4 short tons; 12.4 to 33.4 long tons), and mature females may have been 27.4 to 59.4 t (30.2 to 65.5 short tons; 27.0 to 58.5 long tons), assuming that males could range in length from 10.5 to 14.3 meters (34 to 47 ft) and females 13.3 to 17 meters (44 to 56 ft). A 2015 study estimated the modal total body length at 10.5 meters (34 ft), calculated from 544 megalodon teeth, found throughout geological time and geography, including juveniles and adults ranging from 2.2 to 17.9 metres (7.2 to 58.7 ft) in total length. In comparison, large great white sharks are generally around 6 meters (20 ft) in length, with a few contentious reports suggesting larger sizes. The whale shark is the largest living fish, with one large female reported with a precaudal length of 15 meters (49 ft) and an estimated total length of 18.8 meters (62 ft). It is possible that different populations of megalodon around the globe had different body sizes and behaviors due to different ecological pressures. Megalodon is thought to have been the largest macropredatory shark that ever lived.

In 2020, Cooper and his colleagues reconstructed a 2D model of megalodon based on the dimensions of all the extant lamnid sharks and suggested that a 16 meters (52 ft) long megalodon would have had a 4.65 m (15.3 ft) long head, 1.41 m (4 ft 8 in) tall gill slits, a 1.62 m (5 ft 4 in) tall dorsal fin, 3.08 m (10 ft 1 in) long pectoral fins, and a 3.85 m (12 ft 8 in) tall tail fin. In 2022, Cooper and his colleagues also reconstructed a 3D model with the same basis as the 2020 study, resulting in a body mass estimate of 61.56 t (67.86 short tons; 60.59 long tons) for a 16 meters (52 ft) long megalodon, higher than the previous estimates. A 11.1 metres (36 ft) long vertebral column specimen IRSNB P 9893 (formerly IRSNB 3121) from Belgium, likely belonging to a 46 year old individual, was used for extrapolation. An individual of this size would have required 98,175 kcal per day, 20 times more than what the adult great white requires. Because the total body length of IRSNB P 9893 was previously estimated around 9.2 metres (30 ft), the longer body length estimate by Cooper et al. (2022) led to an alternative hypothesis that megalodon had a more elongated body form than previously thought based on comparison between IRSNB P 9893 and corresponding parts of the extant white sharks' vertebral columns. Shimada et al. (2025) also supported the elongated body plan hypothesis, and this resulted in a similar body length estimate of 16.4 metres (54 ft) and a significantly lower body mass estimate between 26.9–33.7 metric tons (29.7–37.1 short tons) for IRSNB P 9893. IRSNB P 9893 is considered as a mid-sized megalodon specimen.

A 2015 study linking shark size and typical swimming speed estimated that megalodon would have typically swum at 18 kilometers per hour (11 mph)–assuming that its body mass was typically 48 t (53 short tons; 47 long tons)–which is consistent with other aquatic creatures of its size, such as the fin whale (Balaenoptera physalus) which typically cruises at speeds of 14.5 to 21.5 km/h (9.0 to 13.4 mph). In 2022, Cooper and his colleagues converted this calculation into relative cruising speed (body lengths per second), resulting in a mean absolute cruising speed of 5 kilometers per hour (3.1 mph) and a mean relative cruising speed of 0.09 body lengths per second for a 16 meters (52 ft) long megalodon; the authors found their mean absolute cruising speed to be faster than any extant lamnid sharks and their mean relative cruising speed to be slower, consistent with previous estimates.

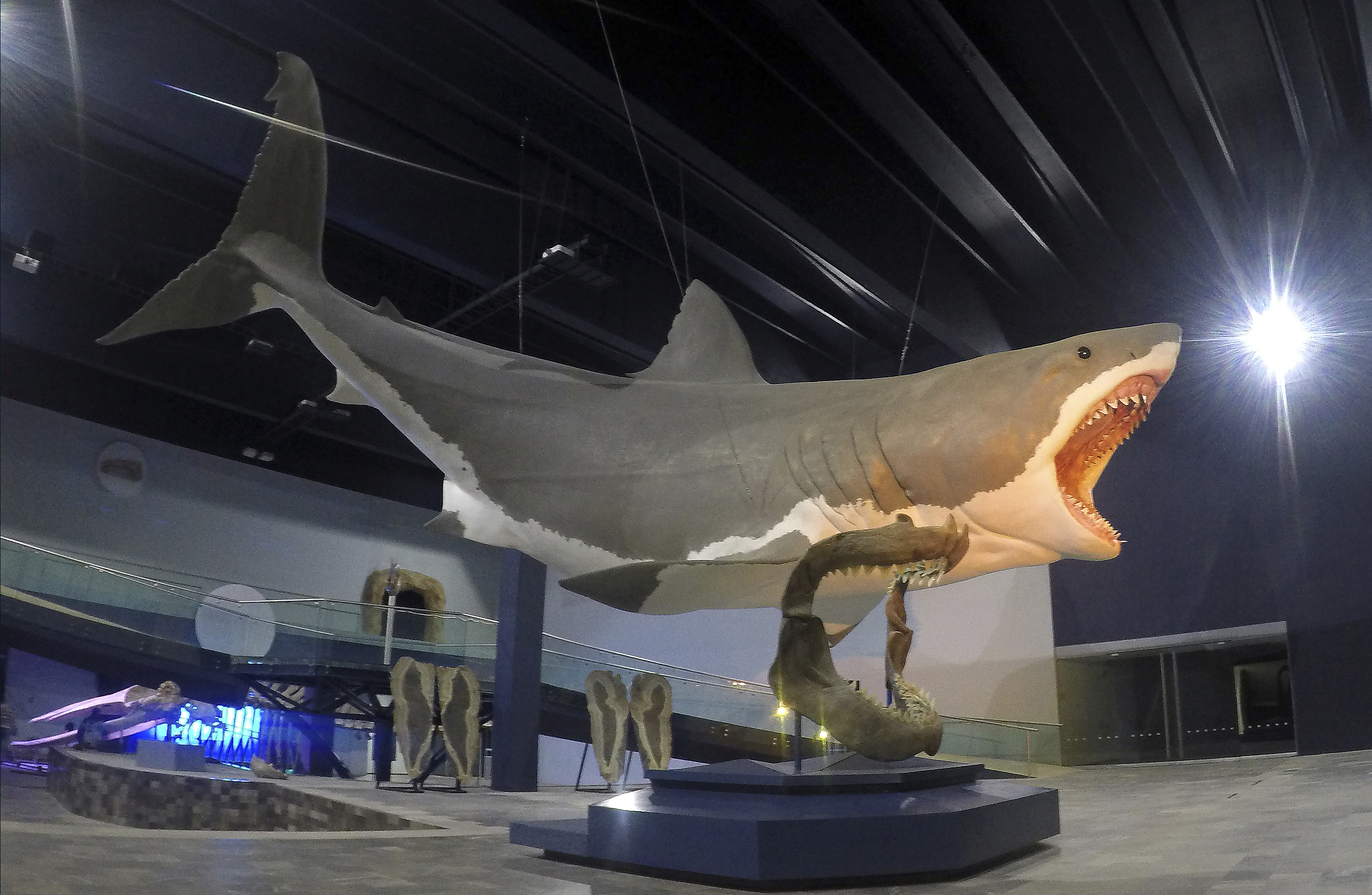
Sculpture in the Museum of Evolution in Puebla, Mexico

Its large size may have been due to climatic factors and the abundance of large prey items, and it may have also been influenced by the evolution of regional endothermy (mesothermy) which would have increased its metabolic rate and swimming speed. The otodontid sharks have been considered to have been ectotherms, so on that basis megalodon would have been ectothermic. However, the largest contemporary ectothermic sharks, such as the whale shark, are filter feeders, while lamnids are regional endotherms, implying some metabolic correlations with a predatory lifestyle. These considerations, as well as tooth oxygen isotopic data and the need for higher burst swimming speeds in macropredators of endothermic prey than ectothermy would allow, imply that otodontids, including megalodon, were probably regional endotherms.

In 2020, Shimada and colleagues suggested large size was instead due to intrauterine cannibalism, where the larger fetus eats the smaller fetus, resulting in progressively larger and larger fetuses, requiring the mother to attain even greater size as well as caloric requirements which would have promoted endothermy. Males would have needed to keep up with female size in order to still effectively copulate (which probably involved latching onto the female with claspers, like modern cartilaginous fish).

==== Maximum estimates ====
The first attempt to reconstruct the jaw of megalodon was made by Bashford Dean in 1909, displayed at the American Museum of Natural History. From the dimensions of this jaw reconstruction, it was hypothesized that megalodon could have approached 30 meters (98 ft) in length. Dean had overestimated the size of the cartilage on both jaws, causing it to be too tall.

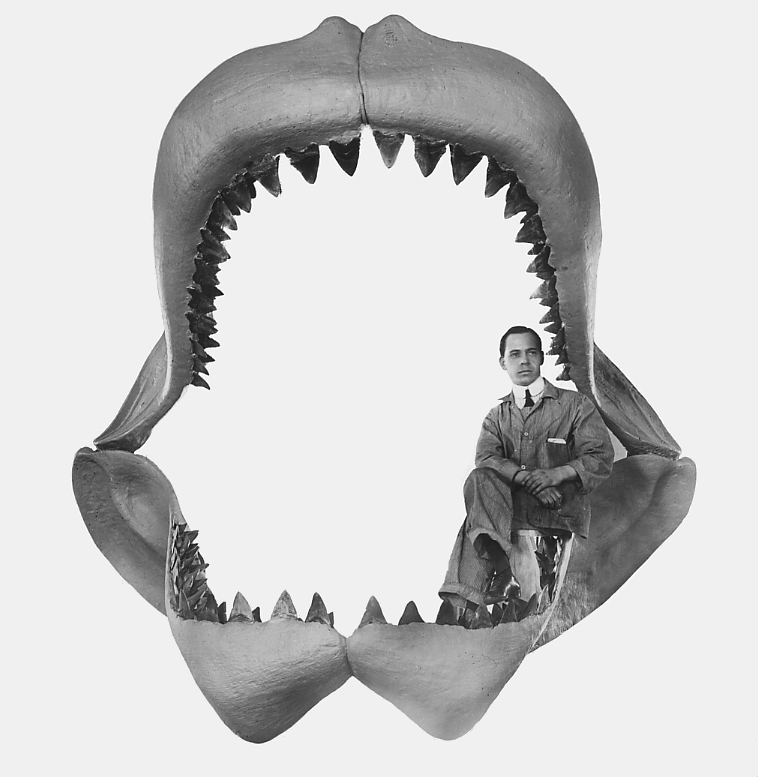
Reconstruction by Bashford Dean in 1909

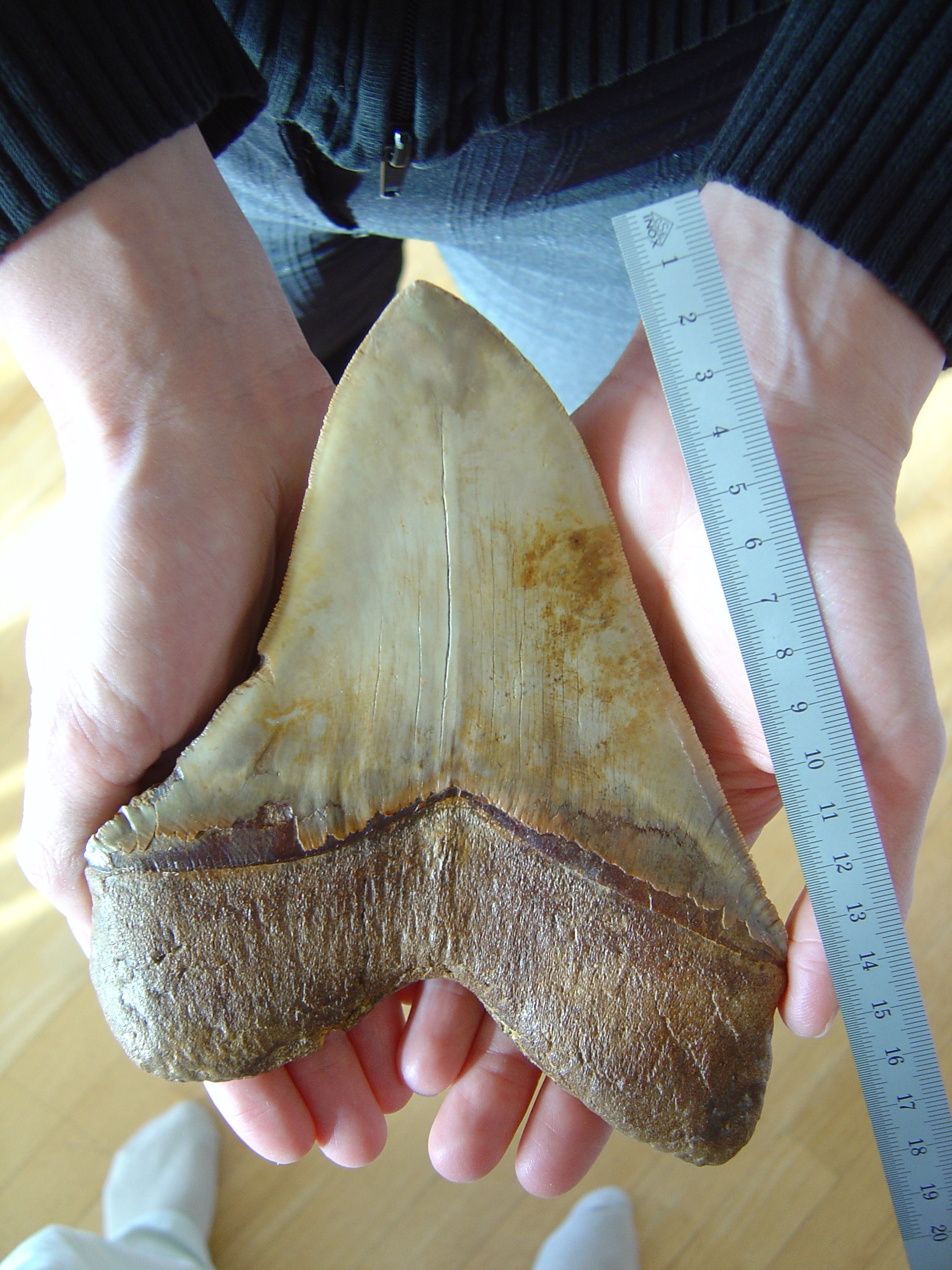
Tooth compared to hand

In 1973, John E. Randall, an ichthyologist, used the enamel height (the vertical distance of the blade from the base of the enamel portion of the tooth to its tip) to measure the length of the shark, yielding a maximum length of about 13 meters (43 ft). However, tooth enamel height does not necessarily increase in proportion to the animal's total length.

In 1994, marine biologists Patrick J. Schembri and Stephen Papson opined that O. megalodon may have approached a maximum of around 24 to 25 meters (79 to 82 ft) in total length.

In 1996, shark researchers Michael D. Gottfried, Leonard Compagno, and S. Curtis Bowman proposed a linear relationship between the great white shark's total length and the height of the largest upper anterior tooth. The proposed relationship is: total length in meters = − (0.096) × [UA maximum height (mm)]-(0.22). Using this tooth height regression equation, the authors estimated a total length of 15.9 meters (52 ft) based on a tooth 16.8 centimeters (6.6 in) tall, which the authors considered a conservative maximum estimate. They also compared the ratio between the tooth height and total length of large female great whites to the largest megalodon tooth. A 6-meter (20 ft) long female great white, which the authors considered the largest 'reasonably trustworthy' total length, produced an estimate of 16.8 meters (55 ft). However, based on the largest female great white reported, at 7.1 meters (23 ft), they estimated a maximum estimate of 20.2 meters (66 ft).

In 2002, shark researcher Clifford Jeremiah proposed that total length was proportional to the root width of an upper anterior tooth. He claimed that for every 1 centimeter (0.39 in) of root width, there are approximately 1.4 meters (4.6 ft) of shark length. Jeremiah pointed out that the jaw perimeter of a shark is directly proportional to its total length, with the width of the roots of the largest teeth being a tool for estimating jaw perimeter. The largest tooth in Jeremiah's possession had a root width of about 12 centimeters (4.7 in), which yielded 16.5 meters (54 ft) in total length.

In 2002, paleontologist Kenshu Shimada of DePaul University proposed a linear relationship between tooth crown height and total length after conducting anatomical analysis of several specimens, allowing any sized tooth to be used. Shimada stated that the previously proposed methods were based on a less-reliable evaluation of the dental homology between megalodon and the great white shark, and that the growth rate between the crown and root is not isometric, which he considered in his model. Using this model, the upper anterior tooth possessed by Gottfried and colleagues corresponded to a total length of 15 meters (49 ft). Among several specimens found in the Gatún Formation of Panama, one upper lateral tooth was used by other researchers to obtain a total length estimate of 17.9 meters (59 ft) using this method.

A C. megalodon about 16 meters long would have weighed about 48 metric tons (53 tons). A 17-meter (56-foot) C. megalodon would have weighed about 59 metric tons (65 tons), and a 20.3-meter (67 foot) monster would have topped off at 103 metric tons (114 tons).

In his 2015 book, The Story of Life in 25 Fossils: Tales of Intrepid Fossil Hunters and the Wonders of Evolution, Donald Prothero proposed the body mass estimates for different individuals of different length by extrapolating from a vertebral centra based on the dimensions of the great white, a methodology also used for the 2008 study which supports the maximum mass estimate.

In 2019, Shimada revisited the size of megalodon and discouraged using non-anterior teeth for estimations, noting that the exact position of isolated non-anterior teeth is difficult to identify. Shimada provided maximum total length estimates using the largest anterior teeth available in museums. The tooth with the tallest crown height known to Shimada, NSM PV-19896, produced a total length estimate of 14.2 meters (47 ft). The tooth with the tallest total height, FMNH PF 11306, was reported at 16.8 centimeters (6.6 in). However, Shimada remeasured the tooth and found it actually to measure 16.2 centimeters (6.4 in). Using the total height tooth regression equation proposed by Gottfried and colleagues produced an estimate of 15.3 meters (50 ft).

In 2021, Victor J. Perez, Ronny M. Leder, and Teddy Badaut proposed a method of estimating total length of megalodon from the sum of the tooth crown widths. Using more complete megalodon dentitions, they reconstructed the dental formula and then made comparisons to living sharks. The researchers noted that the 2002 Shimada crown height equations produce wildly varying results for different teeth belonging to the same shark (range of error of ± 9 metres (30 ft)), casting doubt on some of the conclusions of previous studies using that method. Using the largest tooth available to the authors, GHC 6, with a crown width of 13.3 centimeters (5.2 in), they estimated a maximum body length of approximately 20 meters (66 ft), with a range of error of approximately ± 3.5 metres (11 ft). This maximum length estimate was also supported by Cooper and his colleagues in 2022.

In 2025, Shimada and colleagues proposed a significantly higher maximum length estimate of 24.3 metres (80 ft) based on the hypothesis that megalodon had a much more elongated body plan than previously thought. An individual of such length was estimated to have weighed between 83.6 and 104.7 metric tons (92.2 and 115.4 short tons), with an estimated cruising speed of 2.1–3.5 kilometers per hour (1.3–2.2 mph).

A 2026 study and redescription of a set of megalodon vertebrae recovered after being lost in storage, labelled as NHMD 157890 from the Gram Formation of Denmark used in Shimada's 2025 study not only suggests an individual length of 24.3 metres (80 ft) for the specimen analyzed in the study but the potential to grow to a maximum body length of 28 metres (91.8 ft). This same study suggests a theoretical maximum lifespan of 96 years, with observable growth bands on vertebra I of NHMD 157890 suggesting a size at birth of about 3.6 metres (11.8 ft) for the specimen. Due to the extrapolations being made from an incomplete specimen, the authors suggest to take extreme caution and regard these estimates as highly tentative at present.

There are anecdotal reports of teeth larger than those found in museum collections. Gordon Hubbell from Gainesville, Florida, possesses an upper anterior megalodon tooth whose maximum height is 18.4 centimeters (7.25 in), one of the largest known tooth specimens from the shark. In addition, a 2.7-by-3.4-meter (9 by 11 ft) megalodon jaw reconstruction developed by fossil hunter Vito Bertucci contains a tooth whose maximum height is reportedly over 18 centimeters (7 in).

=== Teeth and bite force ===
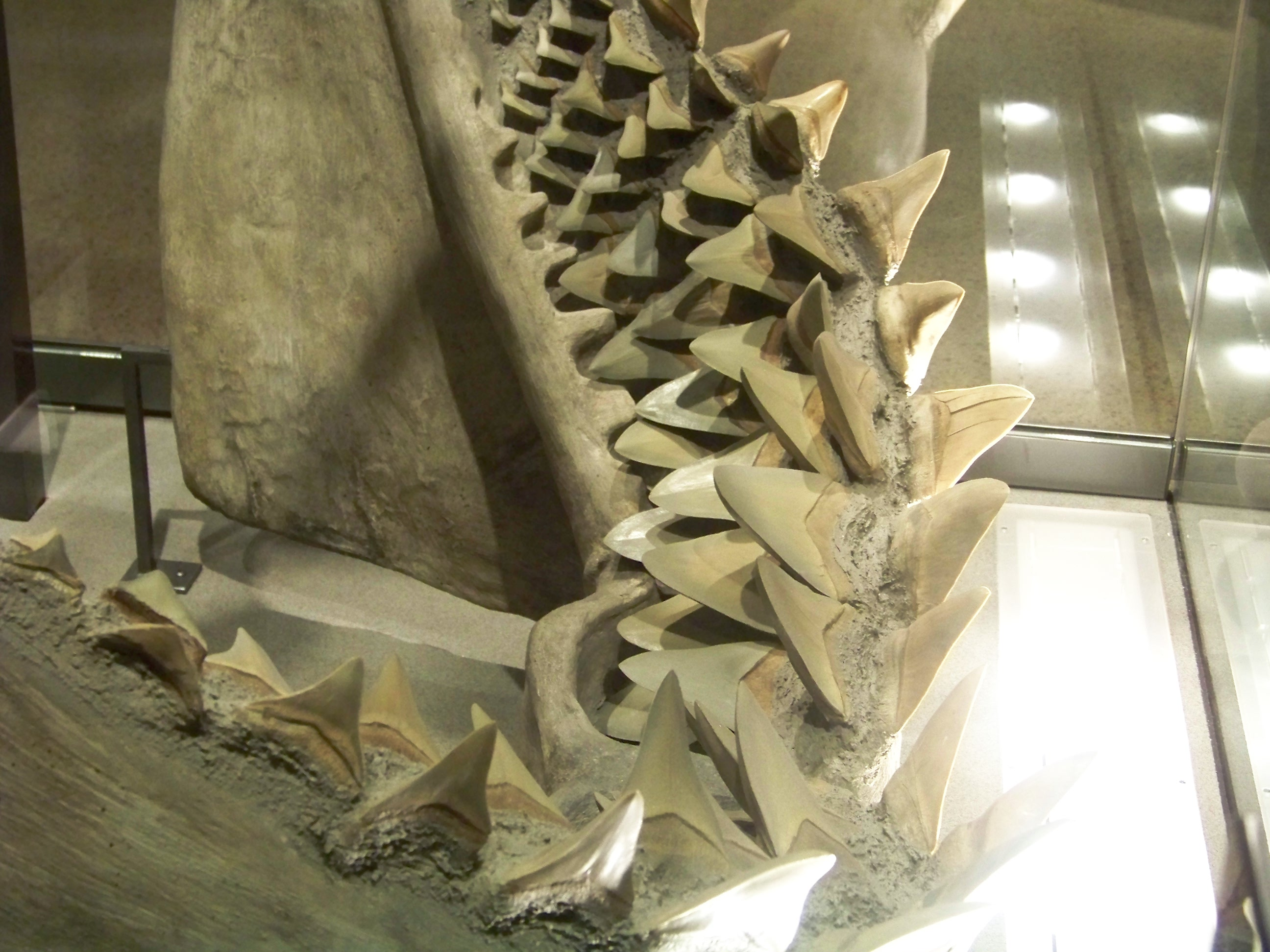
Reconstruction showing the position of the replacement teeth

The most common fossils of megalodon are its teeth. Diagnostic characteristics include a triangular shape, robust structure, large size, fine serrations, a lack of lateral denticles, and a visible V-shaped neck (where the root meets the crown). The tooth met the jaw at a steep angle, similar to the great white shark. The tooth was anchored by connective tissue fibers, and the roughness of the base may have added to mechanical strength. The lingual side of the tooth, the part facing the tongue, was convex; and the labial side, the other side of the tooth, was slightly convex or flat. The anterior teeth were almost perpendicular to the jaw and symmetrical, whereas the posterior teeth were slanted and asymmetrical.

Megalodon teeth can measure over 180 millimeters (7.1 in) in slant height (diagonal length) and are the largest of any known shark species, implying it was the largest of all macropredatory sharks. In 1989, a nearly complete set of megalodon teeth was discovered in Saitama, Japan. Another nearly complete associated megalodon dentition was excavated from the Yorktown Formations in the United States, and served as the basis of a jaw reconstruction of megalodon at the National Museum of Natural History (USNM). Based on these discoveries, an artificial dental formula was put together for megalodon in 1996.

The dental formula of megalodon is: 2.1.7.43.0.8.4. As evident from the formula, megalodon had four kinds of teeth in its jaws: anterior, intermediate, lateral, and posterior. Megalodon's intermediate tooth technically appears to be an upper anterior and is termed as "A3" because it is fairly symmetrical and does not point mesially (side of the tooth toward the midline of the jaws where the left and right jaws meet). Megalodon had a very robust dentition, and had over 250 teeth in its jaws, spanning 5 rows. It is possible that large individuals had jaws spanning roughly 2 meters (6.6 ft) across. The teeth were also serrated, which would have improved efficiency in cutting through flesh or bone. The shark may have been able to open its mouth to a 75° angle, though a reconstruction at the USNM approximates a 100° angle.

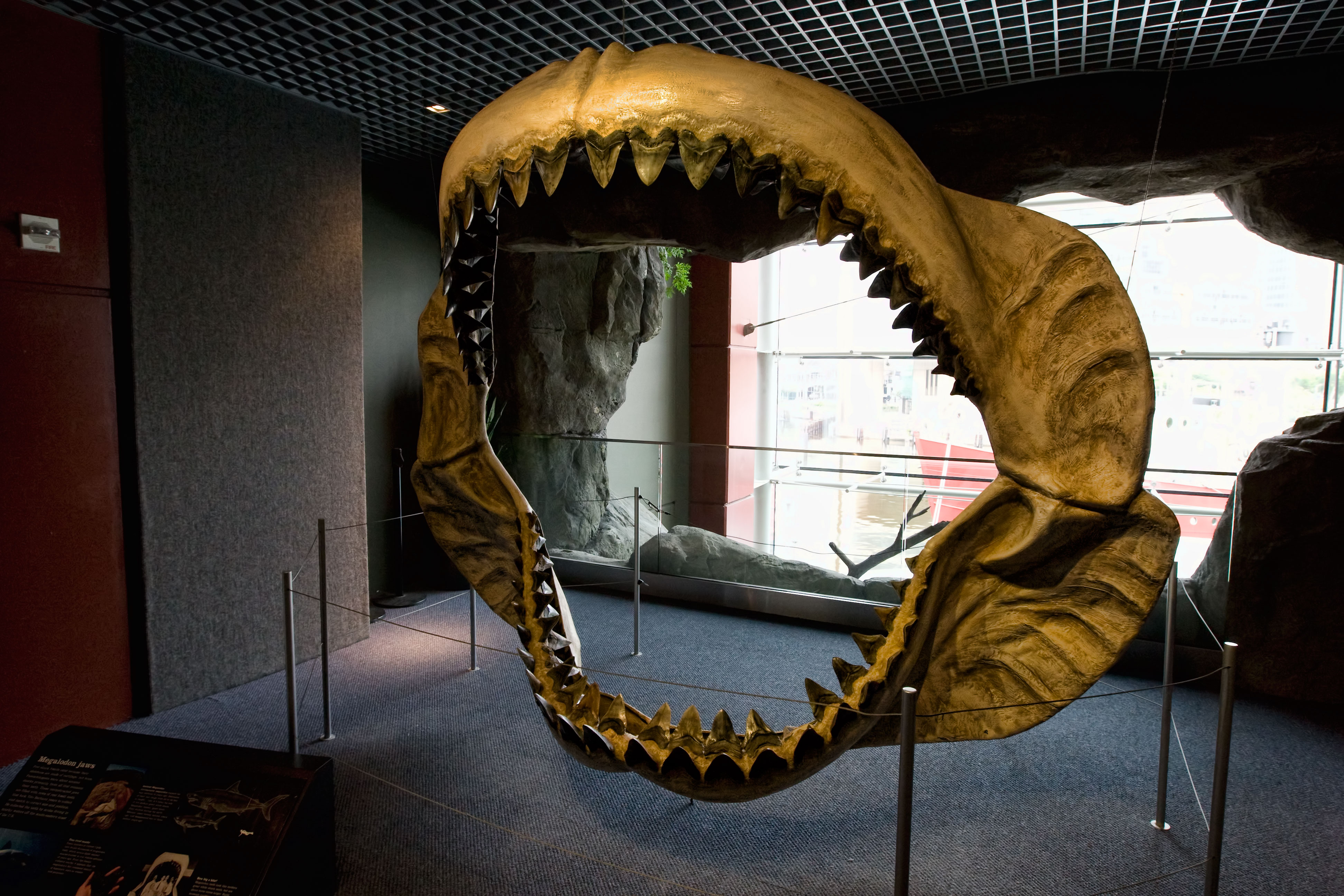
Reconstructed jaws on display at the National Aquarium in Baltimore

In 2008, a team of scientists led by S. Wroe conducted an experiment to determine the bite force of the great white shark, using a 2.5-meter (8.2 ft) long specimen, and then isometrically scaled the results for its maximum size and the conservative minimum and maximum body mass of megalodon. They placed the bite force of the latter between 108,514 to 182,201 newtons (24,395 to 40,960 lbf) in a posterior bite, compared to the 18,216 newtons (4,095 lbf) bite force for the largest confirmed great white shark, and 7,495 newtons (1,685 lbf) for the placoderm fish Dunkleosteus. In addition, Wroe and colleagues pointed out that sharks shake sideways while feeding, amplifying the force generated, which would probably have caused the total force experienced by prey to be higher than the estimate.

In 2021, Antonio Ballell and Humberto Ferrón used Finite Element Analysis modeling to examine the stress distribution of three types of megalodon teeth and closely related mega-toothed species when exposed to anterior and lateral forces, the latter of which would be generated when a shark shakes its head to tear through flesh. The resulting simulations identified higher levels of stress in megalodon teeth under lateral force loads compared to its precursor species such as O. obliquus and O. angusteidens when tooth size was removed as a factor. This suggests that megalodon teeth were of a different functional significance than previously expected, challenging prior interpretations that megalodon's dental morphology was primarily driven by a dietary shift towards marine mammals. Instead, the authors proposed that it was a byproduct of an increase in body size caused by heterochronic selection.

=== Internal anatomy ===
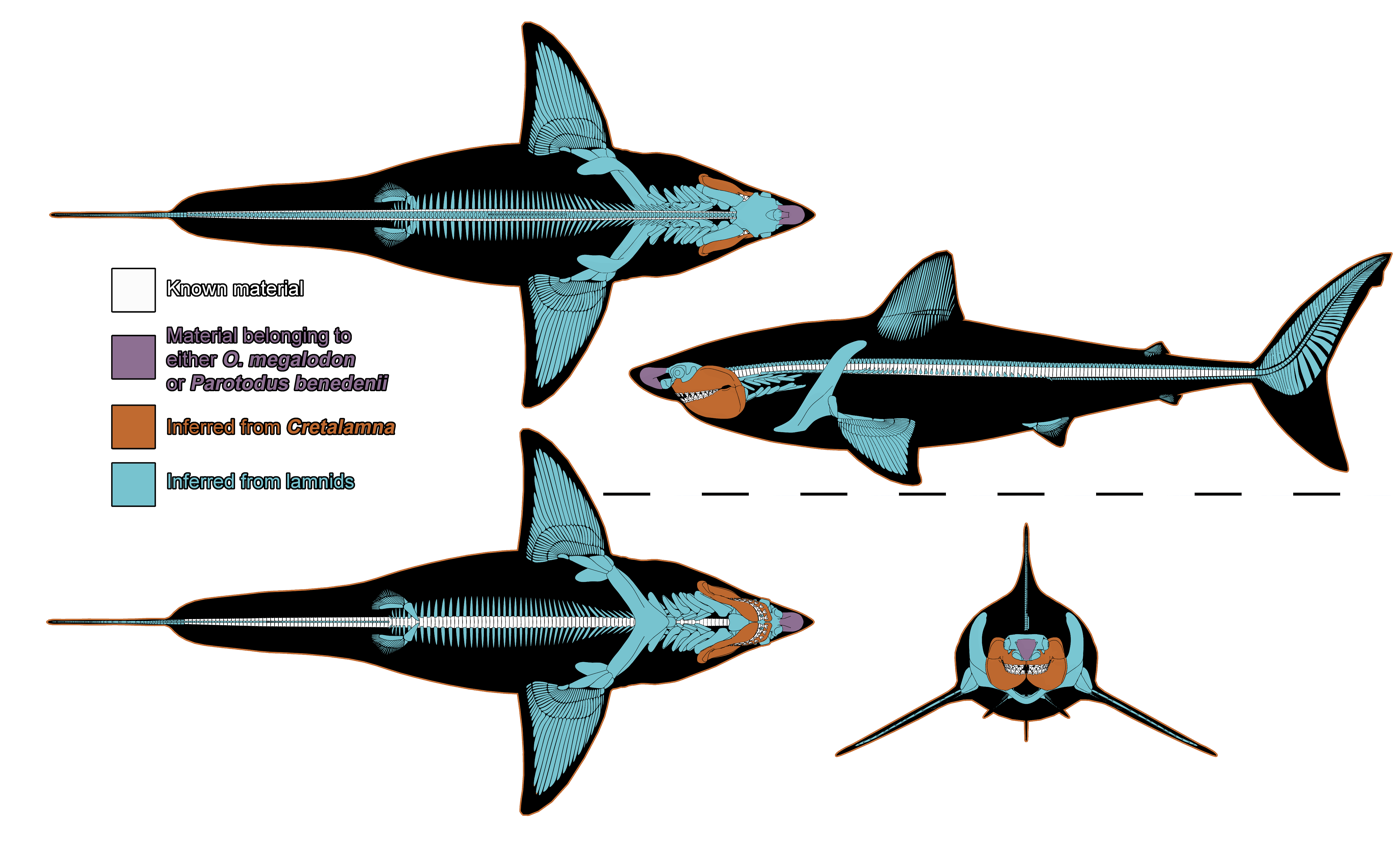
Restoration of the skeleton of O. megalodon based on modern lamniforms, with known elements highlighted

Megalodon is represented in the fossil record by teeth, vertebral centra, and coprolites. As with all sharks, the skeleton of megalodon was formed of cartilage rather than bone; consequently most fossil specimens are poorly preserved. To support its large dentition, the jaws of megalodon would have been more massive, stouter, and more strongly developed than those of the great white, which possesses a comparatively gracile dentition. Its chondrocranium, the cartilaginous skull, would have had a blockier and more robust appearance than that of the great white. Its fins were proportional to its larger size.

Some fossil vertebrae have been found. The most notable example is a partially preserved vertebral column of a single specimen, excavated in the Antwerp Basin, Belgium, in 1926. It comprises 150 vertebral centra, with the centra ranging from 55 millimeters (2.2 in) to 155 millimeters (6 in) in diameter. The shark's vertebrae may have gotten much bigger, and scrutiny of the specimen revealed that it had a higher vertebral count than specimens of any known shark, possibly over 200 centra; only the great white approached it. Another partially preserved vertebral column of a megalodon was excavated from the Gram Formation in Denmark in 1983, which comprises 20 vertebral centra, with the centra ranging from 100 millimeters (4 in) to 230 millimeters (9 in) in diameter.

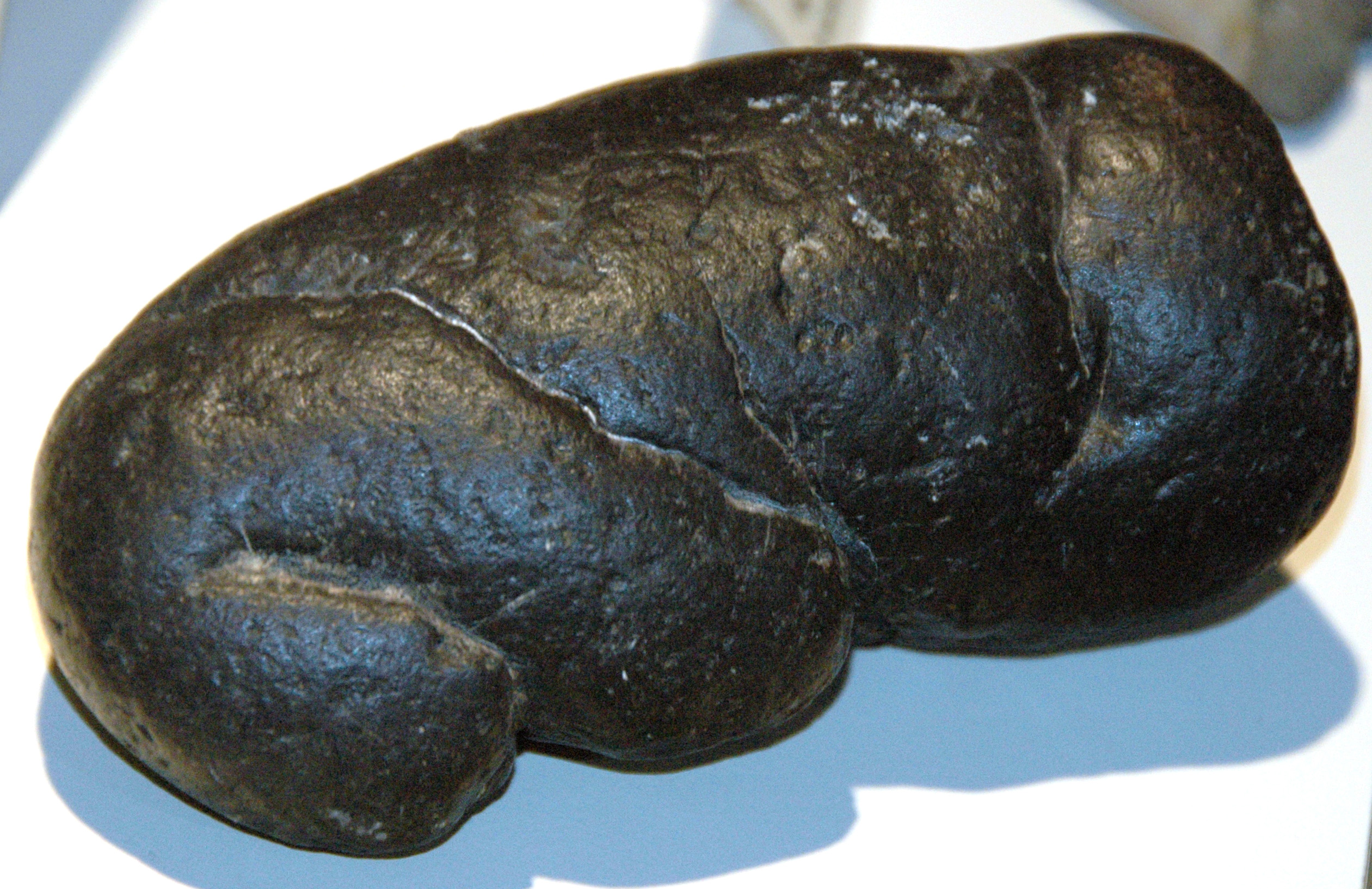
Coprolite attributed to megalodon

The coprolite remains of megalodon are spiral-shaped, indicating that the shark may have had a spiral valve, a corkscrew-shaped portion of the lower intestines, similar to extant lamniform sharks. Miocene coprolite remains were discovered in Beaufort County, South Carolina, with one measuring 14 cm (5.5 in).

Gottfried and colleagues reconstructed the entire skeleton of megalodon, which was later put on display at the Calvert Marine Museum in the United States and the Iziko South African Museum. This reconstruction is 11.3 meters (37 ft) long and represents a mature male, based on the ontogenetic changes a great white shark experiences over the course of its life.

== Paleobiology ==
=== Prey relationships ===
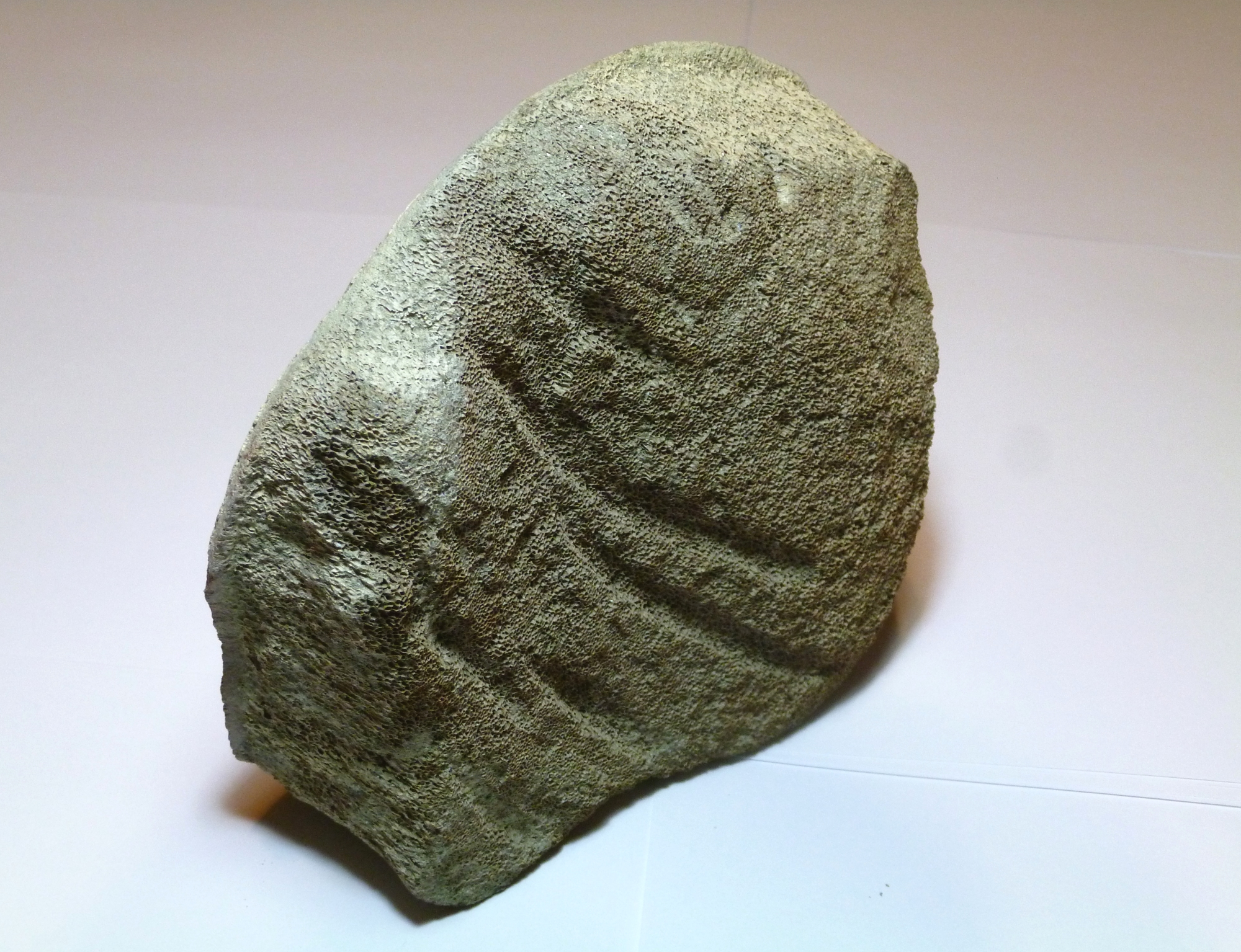
Vertebra of a whale bitten in half by a Megalodon with visible gashes from teeth.

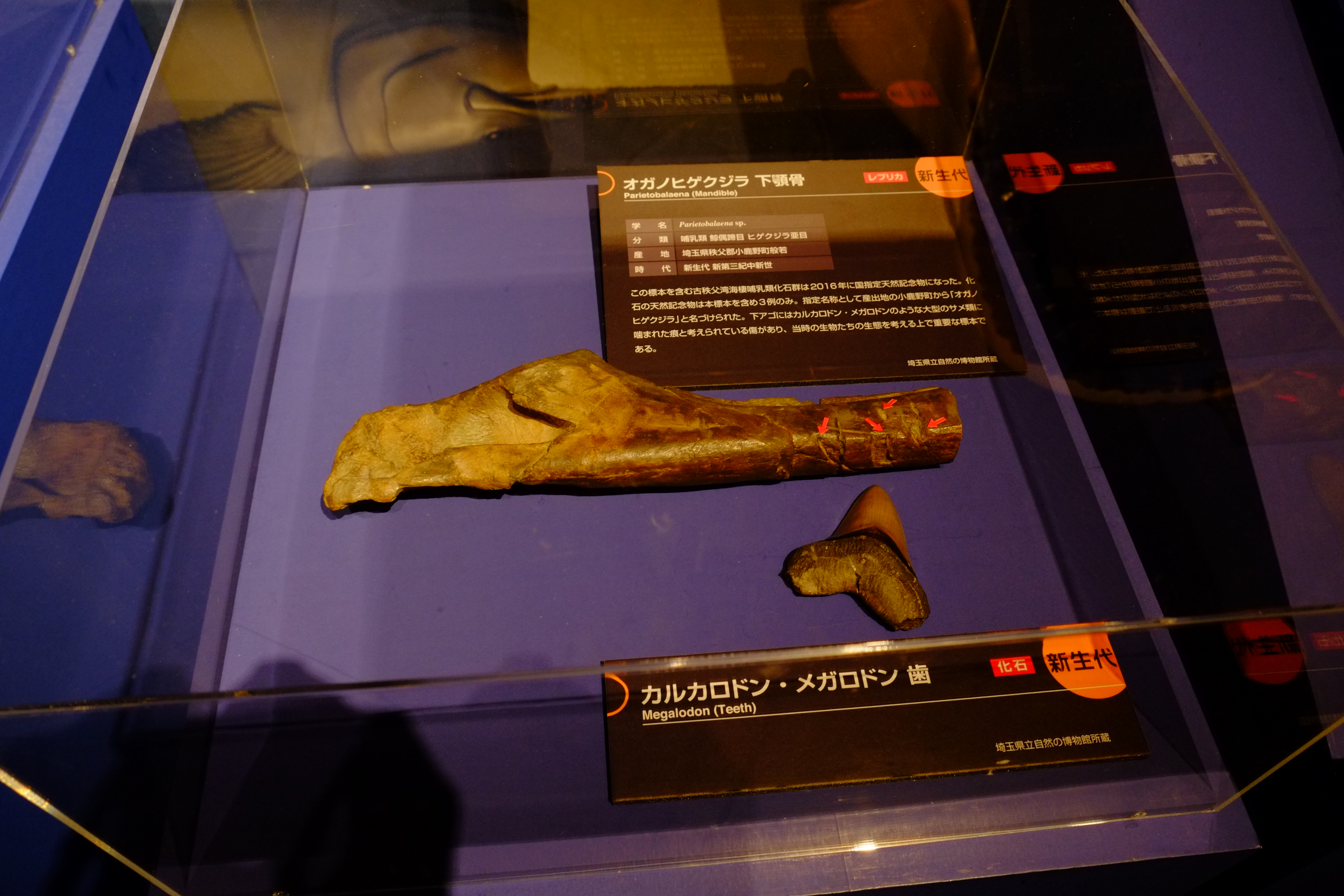
A mandible of the baleen whale Parietobalaena with bite marks made by Megalodon

Though sharks are generally opportunistic feeders, megalodon's great size, high-speed swimming capability, and powerful jaws, coupled with an impressive feeding apparatus, made it an apex predator capable of consuming a broad spectrum of animals. Otodus megalodon was probably one of the most powerful predators to have existed. Trophic level of megalodon have varied based on isotopic values. A study focusing on calcium isotopes of extinct and extant elasmobranch sharks and rays revealed that megalodon fed at a higher trophic level than the contemporaneous great white shark ("higher up" in the food chain). On the other hand, nitrogen isotopes found that megalodon's trophic level was at least two levels higher than the great white shark. However, the extremely high trophic levels of nitrogen isotopes has been viewed as problematic as there's little evidence to suggest Miocene food chains were significantly longer than those of today, at least during the Burdigalian. ^{Including supplementary materials} Zinc isotopic analysis revealed that megalodon saw a decrease in trophic level in the Atlantic Ocean during the early Pliocene. In North Carolina, megalodon and great white sharks have been noted to have an overlapping trophic level. A more recent analysis based on zinc isotopic values suggested megalodon was a opportunistic supercarnivore with high dietary flexibility at a population level.

Dental microwear of Mediterranean megalodon specimens from the Miocene shows that like modern great white sharks, it had a highly generalist diet that would have included invertebrates, marine mammals, marine reptiles, bony fish, and other elasmobranchs. Direct fossil evidence indicates that megalodon preyed upon many cetacean species, such as dolphins, small whales, cetotheres, squalodontids (shark toothed dolphins), physeteroidea inclusive macroraptorial, bowhead whales, and rorquals (such as fin whales and blue whales). In addition to this, they also targeted seals, sirenians, and sea turtles. The shark was an opportunist and piscivorous, and it would have also gone after smaller fish and other sharks. Many whale bones have been found with deep gashes most likely made by their teeth. Various excavations have revealed megalodon teeth lying close to the chewed remains of whales, and sometimes in direct association with them.

A 2022 study examined the remains of multiple physeteroids, specimens of two species of the Kogiid Scaphokogia as well as the holotypes of Acrophyseter deinodon and Livyatan melvillei, and discovered bite marks made by sharks on the examined specimens, some of which displayed serrations consistent with the teeth of either the modern great white shark or megalodon, though the authors of the paper refrained from a specific identification of the animal which caused the bite marks. The bite marks on the holotype of Livyatan are from a region of the skull which would have only been accessible to scavengers.

The feeding ecology of megalodon appears to have varied with age and between sites, like the modern great white shark. It is plausible that the adult megalodon population off the coast of Peru targeted primarily cetothere whales 2.5 to 7 meters (8.2 to 23 ft) in length and other prey smaller than itself, rather than large whales in the same size class as themselves. Meanwhile, juveniles likely had a diet that consisted more of fish.

=== Feeding strategies ===
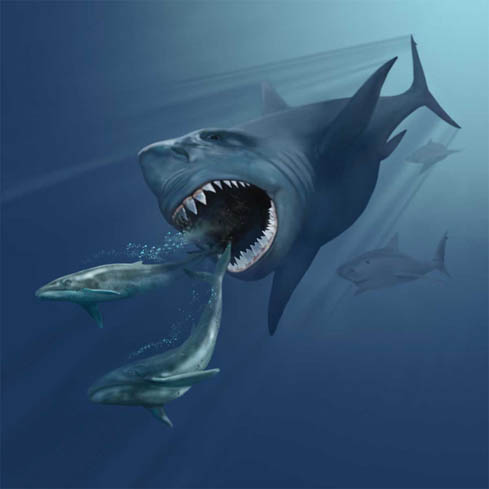
Artistic impression of a megalodon pursuing two Eobalaenoptera whales

Sharks often employ complex hunting strategies to engage large prey animals. Great white shark hunting strategies may be similar to how megalodon hunted its large prey. Megalodon bite marks on whale fossils suggest that it employed different hunting strategies against large prey than the great white shark.

One particular specimen–the remains of a 9-meter (30 ft) long undescribed Miocene baleen whale–provided the first opportunity to quantitatively analyze its attack behavior. Unlike great whites which target the underbelly of their prey, megalodon probably targeted the heart and lungs, with their thick teeth adapted for biting through tough bone, as indicated by bite marks inflicted to the rib cage and other tough bony areas on whale remains. Furthermore, attack patterns could differ for prey of different sizes. Fossil remains of some small cetaceans, for example cetotheres, suggest that they were rammed with great force from below before being killed and eaten, based on compression fractures.

There is also evidence that a possible separate hunting strategy existed for attacking raptorial sperm whales; a tooth belonging to an undetermined 4 m (13 ft) physeteroid closely resembling those of Acrophyseter discovered in the Nutrien Aurora Phosphate Mine in North Carolina suggests that a megalodon or O. chubutensis may have aimed for the head of the sperm whale in order to inflict a fatal bite, the resulting attack leaving distinctive bite marks on the tooth. While scavenging behavior cannot be ruled out as a possibility, the placement of the bite marks is more consistent with predatory attacks than feeding by scavenging, as the jaw is not a particularly nutritious area to for a shark feed or focus on. The fact that the bite marks were found on the tooth's roots further suggest that the shark broke the whale's jaw during the bite, suggesting the bite was extremely powerful. The fossil is also notable as it stands as the first known instance of an antagonistic interaction between a sperm whale and an otodontid shark recorded in the fossil record.

During the Pliocene, larger cetaceans appeared. Megalodon apparently further refined its hunting strategies to cope with these large whales. Numerous fossilized flipper bones and tail vertebrae of large whales from the Pliocene have been found with megalodon bite marks, which suggests that megalodon would immobilize a large whale before killing and feeding on it.

They hunted eurhinodelphinids in a similar way. Three Neogene odontocete peduncular caudal vertebrae from the Pliocene Yorktown Formation show bilateral gouge marks consistent with having been actively bitten and wedged between adjacent teeth of Megalodon or O. chubutensis. None of the vertebrae show any signs of healing. The occurrence of bite marks suggests the event was an active predation event rather than a scavenging event.

Examination of the specimen NHMD 157890 suggests that basking sharks of the family Cetorhinidae were a potential dietary component. Partial gill rakers and placoid scales of an unidentified cetorhinid found in association with the megalodon specimen imply that the cetorhinid was consumed and largely digested by megalodon.

=== Growth and reproduction ===
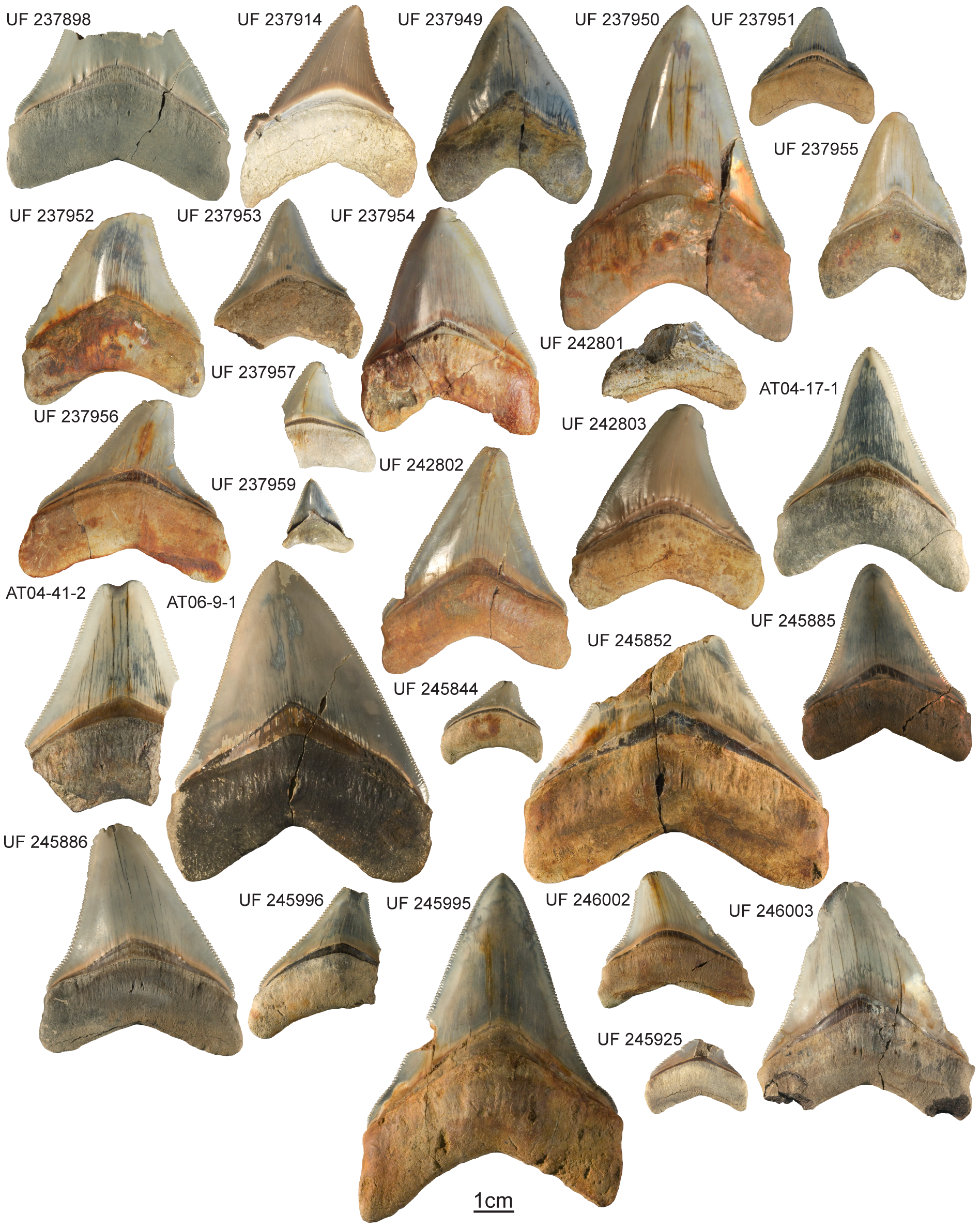
Collection of teeth of juvenile megalodon and O. chubutensis from a probable nursery area in the Gatún Formation of Panama

In 2010, Ehret estimated that megalodon had a fast growth rate nearly two times that of the extant great white shark. He also estimated that the slowing or cessation of somatic growth in megalodon occurred around 25 years of age, suggesting the species had an extremely delayed sexual maturity. In 2021, Shimada and colleagues calculated the growth rate of an approximately 9.2 m (30 ft) individual based on the Belgian vertebrate column specimen that presumably contains annual growth rings on three of its vertebrae. They estimated the individual died at 46 years of age, with a growth rate of 16 cm (6.3 in) per year, and a length of 2 m (6 ft 7 in) at birth. For a 15 m (49 ft) individual – which they considered the maximum attainable size – this would equate to a lifespan of 88 to 100 years. However, Cooper and his colleagues in 2022 estimated the length of this 46 year old individual at nearly 16 m (52 ft) based on the 3D reconstruction which resulted in the complete vertebral column to be 11.1 m (36 ft) long; the researchers claimed that this size estimate difference occurred due to the fact that Shimada and his colleagues extrapolated its size solely from the vertebral centra.

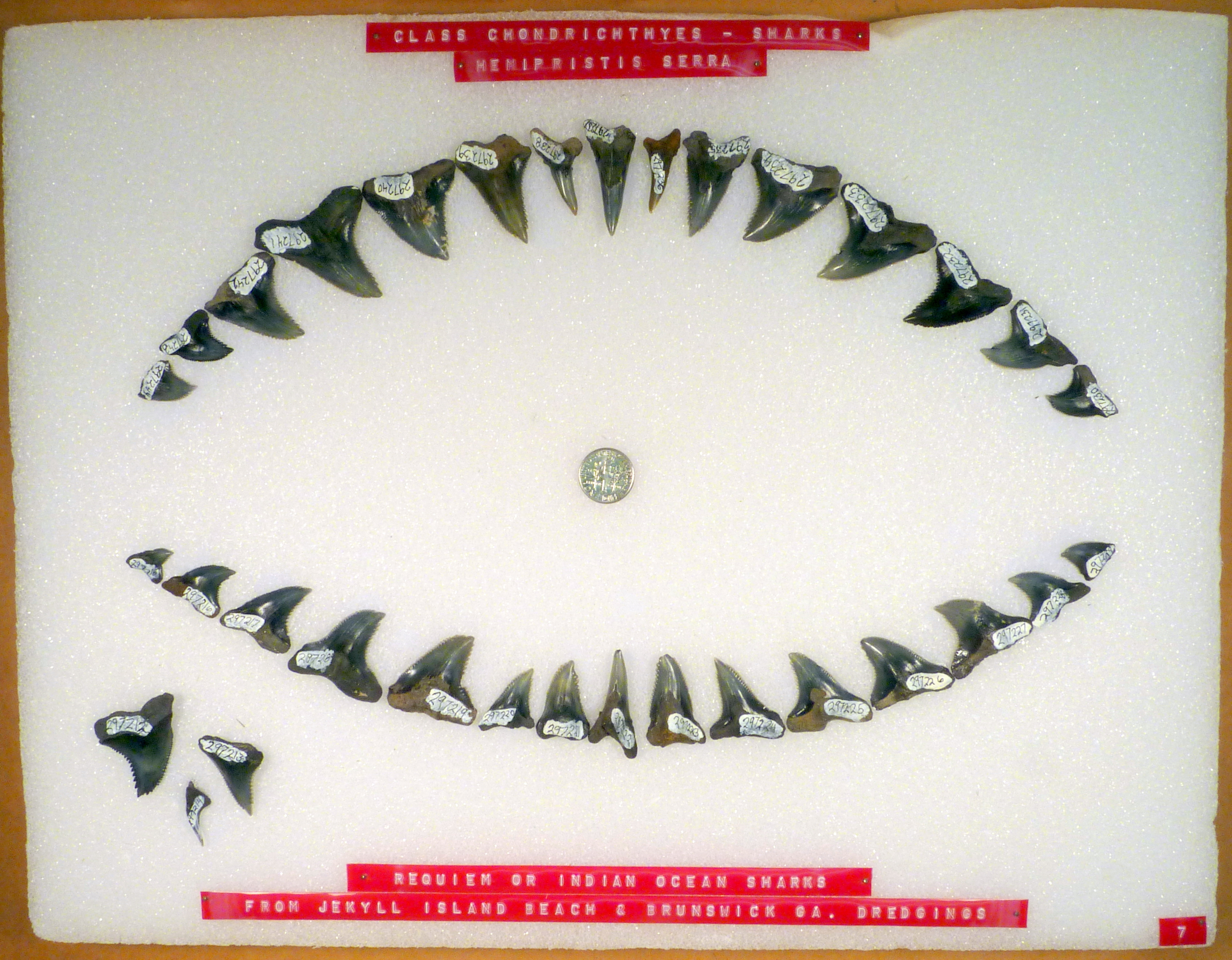
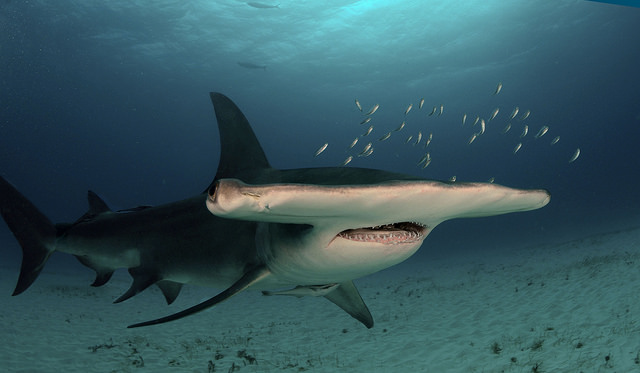
Teeth of the Snaggletooth shark (Hemipristis serra) (top) and a picture of the modern Great hammerhead (Sphyrna mokarran) (bottom), both of which had overlapping presence with young megalodon in the Gatún Formation of Panama.

Megalodon, like contemporaneous sharks, made use of nursery areas to birth their young, specifically warm-water coastal environments with abundant food and protection from predators. Nursery sites were identified in the Gatún Formation of Panama, the Calvert Formation of Maryland, Banco de Concepción in the Canary Islands, the Bone Valley Formation of Florida and the Reverté Quarries of Spain. Shimada et al. (2023) conversely interpreted the proposed nurseries as evidence of Bergmann's rule, in which larger individuals are found in areas of colder climates and smaller individuals in areas of warmer climates. However, Ferrón et al. (2026) found no evidence of Bergmann's rule affecting O. megalodon populations, re-interpreting the small bodied fossils as indicative of nurseries. Given that all extant lamniform sharks give birth to live young, this is believed to have been true of megalodon also. Size of a neonatal O. megalodon was originally underestimated at 2 meters (6.6 ft), small enough to be vulnerable to predation by other shark species, such as the great hammerhead shark (Sphyrna mokarran) and the snaggletooth shark (Hemipristis serra), but re-assessment of body sizes and growth pattern revealed that they were large-bodied around 4 meters (13 ft)—large enough to have few potential enemies and process large bony prey in preferred habitats. Their dietary preferences display an ontogenetic shift: Young megalodon commonly preyed on fish, sea turtles, dugongs, and small cetaceans; mature megalodon moved to off-shore areas and consumed large cetaceans.

An exceptional case in the fossil record suggests that juvenile megalodon may have occasionally attacked much larger balaenopterid whales. Three tooth marks apparently from a 4-to-7-meter (13 to 23 ft) long Pliocene shark, likely a juvenile megalodon, were found on a rib from an ancestral blue or humpback whale that showed evidence of subsequent healing.

Megalodon were likely long-lived sharks with a study by Shimada et al. (2021) which estimated the lifespan of megalodon, calibrated from teeth, at around 88–100 years. The specimen NHMD 157890 was tentatively estimated to have a maximum potential life span of around 95.9 years.

== Paleoecology ==
=== Range and habitat ===
Megalodon had a cosmopolitan distribution. Fossils have been excavated from many parts of the world, including Europe, Africa, the Americas, and Australia. It most commonly occurred in subtropical to temperate latitudes. It has been found at latitudes up to 78° N;, though this is based on a likely dubious record. its inferred tolerated temperature range was 1–24 °C (34–75 °F). (Note: Carbonated bioapatite from a megalodon tooth (of unknown source location) dated to 5.75 ± 0.9 Ma in age has been analyzed for isotope ratios of oxygen (^{18}O/^{16}O) and carbon (^{13}C/^{12}C), using a carbonate clumped-isotope thermometer methodology to yield an estimate of the ambient temperature in that individual's environment of 19 ± 4 °C.) It arguably had the capacity to endure such low temperatures due to mesothermy, the physiological capability of large sharks to maintain a higher body temperature than the surrounding water by conserving metabolic heat.

Megalodon inhabited a wide range of marine environments (i.e., shallow coastal waters, areas of coastal upwelling, swampy coastal lagoons, sandy littorals, and offshore deep water environments) with a transient lifestyle. Adult megalodon were not abundant in shallow water environments, mostly inhabiting offshore areas. Megalodon may have moved between coastal and oceanic waters, particularly in different stages of its life cycle.

Fossil remains show a trend for specimens to be larger on average in the Southern Hemisphere than in the Northern, with mean lengths of 11.6 and 9.6 meters (38 and 31 ft), respectively; and also larger in the Pacific than the Atlantic, with mean lengths of 10.9 and 9.5 meters (36 and 31 ft) respectively. They do not suggest any trend of changing body size with absolute latitude, or of change in size over time (although the Otodus lineage in general is thought to display a trend of increasing size over time). The overall modal length has been estimated at 10.5 meters (34 ft), with the length distribution skewed towards larger individuals, suggesting an ecological or competitive advantage for larger body size.

Shimada et al. (2023) stated that, based on examined specimens of O. megalodon from the Late Miocene of the Western Pacific and Early Pliocene of the Eastern Atlantic, that it exhibited Bergmann's rule, that larger organisms are found in colder climates and smaller organisms in warmer climates. However, Ferrón et al. (2026) re-evaluated the dataset from the 2023 study and found no evidence of a significant relationship between sea-surface temperatures and body size in O. megalodon. Their analysis instead found the fossil assemblages supporting small-bodied specimens to be juvenile-dominated nurseries.

Herraiz et al. (2026) found no evidence of a significant differences of body size of members of Atlantic and Mediterranean populations other than the one known from the Miocene strata from the Reverté quarries of Spain, which was interpreted as a nursery.

==== Locations of fossils ====
Megalodon had a global distribution and fossils of the shark have been found in many places around the world, bordering all oceans of the Neogene

Regions where fossils of Otodus megalodon have been discovered
Epoch	Formation	State/Region	Continent
Pliocene	Fazenda Locality	Cape Verde	Africa
Pliocene	Sahabi Formation	Libya	Africa
Pliocene	Sabratah Basin	Libya	Africa
Pliocene	Hondeklip Bay Locality	South Africa	Africa
Pliocene	Daito Formation	Japan	Asia
Pliocene	Dainenji Formation	Japan	Asia
Pliocene	Harada Formation	Japan	Asia
Pliocene	Hasse Formation	Japan	Asia
Pliocene	Naarai Formation	Japan	Asia
Pliocene	Tatsunokuchi Formation	Japan	Asia
Pliocene	Zugawa Formation	Japan	Asia
Pliocene	Teruma Coast Locality	Japan	Asia
Pliocene	Unknown	Japan	Asia
Pliocene	Cibodas Formation	Indonesia	Asia
Pliocene	Ilagan Formation	Philippines	Asia
Pliocene	Unknown	Belgium	Europe
Pliocene	Castell'Arquato Formation	Italy	Europe
Pliocene	Colli Piaceniti Locality	Italy	Europe
Pliocene	Colline Pisane Locality	Italy	Europe
Pliocene	Maiatico Locality	Italy	Europe
Pliocene	Miano Locality	Italy	Europe
Pliocene	Pienza Locality	Italy	Europe
Pliocene	Siena Locality	Italy	Europe
Pliocene	Tra Lorenzana e Lari Locality	Italy	Europe
Pliocene	Arenas de Huelva Formation	Spain	Europe
Pliocene	Guardamar del Segura Locality	Spain	Europe
Pliocene	Unknown	Spain	Europe
Pliocene	Esbarrondadoiro Formation	Portugal	Europe
Pliocene	Touril Complex Formation	Portugal	Europe
Pliocene	Unknown	Portugal	Europe
Pliocene	Red Crag Formation	United Kingdom	Europe
Pliocene	San Mateo Formation	United States	North America
Pliocene	Towsley Formation	United States	North America
Pliocene	Bone Valley Formation	United States	North America
Pliocene	Nashua Formation	United States	North America
Pliocene	Tamiami Formation	United States	North America
Pliocene	Yorktown Formation	United States	North America
Pliocene	Star Ranch Shell Pit Locality	United States	North America
Pliocene	Unknown	United States	North America
Pliocene	Unknown	United States	North America
Pliocene	Unknown	United States	North America
Pliocene	Highlands Formation	Antigua and Barbuda	North America
Pliocene	Carmen Formation	Mexico	North America
Pliocene	La Salada Formation	Mexico	North America
Pliocene	Refugio Formation	Mexico	North America
Pliocene	San Diego Formation	Mexico	North America
Pliocene	Tirabuzon Formation	Mexico	North America
Pliocene	Unknown	Mexico	North America
Pliocene	Punta Médanos locality	Argentina	South America
Pliocene	Onzole Formation	Ecuador	South America
Pliocene	Paraguaná Formation	Venezuela	South America
Pliocene	Black Rock Sandstone	Australia	Oceania
Pliocene	Cameron Inlet Formation	Australia	Oceania
Pliocene	Grange Burn Formation	Australia	Oceania
Pliocene	Loxton Sand Formation	Australia	Oceania
Pliocene	Whaler's Bluff Formation	Australia	Oceania
Pliocene	Unknown	Australia	Oceania
Pliocene	Tokumaru Formation	New Zealand	Oceania
Pliocene	Tangahoe Formation	New Zealand	Oceania
Pliocene	Matemateatonga Sandstone Formation	New Zealand	Oceania
Pliocene	Unknown	Indian Ocean	
Pliocene	Unknown	Atlantic Ocean	
Pliocene	Unknown	Atlantic Ocean	
Pliocene	Unknown	Atlantic Ocean	
Miocene	Les Planteurs Locality	Algeria	Africa
Miocene	Luanda Formation	Angola	Africa
Miocene	Farol das Lagostas Locality	Angola	Africa
Miocene	Baía dos Barreiros Locality	Cape Verde	Africa
Miocene	Wadi Gharandel Locality	Egypt	Africa
Miocene	Madagascar Basin	Madagascar	Africa
Miocene	Aro Locality	Nigeria	Africa
Miocene	Kijini Hill Locality	Tanzania	Africa
Miocene	Stockley's cave Locality	Tanzania	Africa
Miocene	Varswater Formation	South Africa	Africa
Miocene	Uloa Locality	South Africa	Africa
Miocene	Baripada Limestone Formation	India	Asia
Miocene	Bhuban Formation	India	Asia
Miocene	Kutch Locality	India	Asia
Miocene	Unknown	India	Asia
Miocene	Unknown	India	Asia
Miocene	Kueichulin Formation	Taiwan	Asia
Miocene	Bihoku Group	Japan	Asia
Miocene	Matsuyama Group	Japan	Asia
Miocene	Arakida Formation	Japan	Asia
Miocene	Akeyo Formation	Japan	Asia
Miocene	Aoso Formation	Japan	Asia
Miocene	Chichibumachi Formation	Japan	Asia
Miocene	Fujina Formation	Japan	Asia
Miocene	Furuya Formation	Japan	Asia
Miocene	Godo Formation	Japan	Asia
Miocene	Hannoura Formation	Japan	Asia
Miocene	Hiranita Formation	Japan	Asia
Miocene	Hongo Formation	Japan	Asia
Miocene	Horimatsu Formation	Japan	Asia
Miocene	Ichishi Formation	Japan	Asia
Miocene	Itabashi Formation	Japan	Asia
Miocene	Iwadono Formation	Japan	Asia
Miocene	Kurahara Formation	Japan	Asia
Miocene	Kurosedani Formation	Japan	Asia
Miocene	Kokozura Formation	Japan	Asia
Miocene	Maenami Formation	Japan	Asia
Miocene	Misaki Formation	Japan	Asia
Miocene	Moniwa Formation	Japan	Asia
Miocene	Nagura Formation	Japan	Asia
Miocene	Nashimoto Formation	Japan	Asia
Miocene	Obata Formation	Japan	Asia
Miocene	Oidawara Formation	Japan	Asia
Miocene	Oiso Formation	Japan	Asia
Miocene	Ohi Formation	Japan	Asia
Miocene	Orio Formation	Japan	Asia
Miocene	Oshimojo Formation	Japan	Asia
Miocene	Sakurada Formation	Japan	Asia
Miocene	Sekinobana Formation	Japan	Asia
Miocene	Sekinohana Formation	Japan	Asia
Miocene	Shikiya Formation	Japan	Asia
Miocene	Shimoshiroiwa Formation	Japan	Asia
Miocene	Shukunohora Formation	Japan	Asia
Miocene	Suso Formation	Japan	Asia
Miocene	Takakubo Formation	Japan	Asia
Miocene	Tonokita Formation	Japan	Asia
Miocene	Tsurushi Formation	Japan	Asia
Miocene	Wajimazaki Formation	Japan	Asia
Miocene	Yamairi Formation	Japan	Asia
Miocene	Yoshii Formation	Japan	Asia
Miocene	Chichibu Basin	Japan	Asia
Miocene	Kanagase Locality	Japan	Asia
Miocene	Nagakubo Locality	Japan	Asia
Miocene	Saitama Locality	Japan	Asia
Miocene	Sunagawa Locality	Japan	Asia
Miocene	Yumachi Locality	Japan	Asia
Miocene	Unknown	Japan	Asia
Miocene	Prome Locality	Myanmar	Asia
Miocene	Duho Formation	South Korea	Asia
Miocene	Bentang Formation	Indonesia	Asia
Miocene	Grobogan Locality	Indonesia	Asia
Miocene	Ngembak Locality	Indonesia	Asia
Miocene	Noil Tobee Locality	Indonesia	Asia
Miocene	Soa Basin	Indonesia	Asia
Miocene	Selatajau Locality	Indonesia	Asia
Miocene	Unknown	Indonesia	Asia
Miocene	Unknown	Indonesia	Asia
Miocene	Unknown	Indonesia	Asia
Miocene	Seria Formation	Brunei	Asia
Miocene	Penanjong Beach Locality	Brunei	Asia
Miocene	Eggenburg Group	Austria	Europe
Miocene	Mettmach Group	Austria	Europe
Miocene	Burgeschleinitz Formation	Austria	Europe
Miocene	Hellmayr Formation	Austria	Europe
Miocene	Linz-Melk Formation	Austria	Europe
Miocene	Melker Sand Formation	Austria	Europe
Miocene	Rzhehakia Formation	Austria	Europe
Miocene	Weissenegg Formation	Austria	Europe
Miocene	Eisenstadt-Sopron Basin	Austria	Europe
Miocene	Vienna Basin	Austria	Europe
Miocene	Prambachkirchen Beds	Austria	Europs
Miocene	Allerding Locality	Austria	Europe
Miocene	Baden Locality	Austria	Europe
Miocene	Bad Vöslau Locality	Austria	Europe
Miocene	Brunn am Gebirge Locality	Austria	Europe
Miocene	Bruck an der Leitha Locality	Austria	Europe
Miocene	Eisenstadt Locality	Austria	Europe
Miocene	Großhölflein Locality	Austria	Europe
Miocene	Kaisersteinbruch Locality	Austria	Europe
Miocene	Kalksbug Locality	Austria	Europe
Miocene	Jäferbründl Locality	Austria	Europe
Miocene	Leithagebirge Locality	Austria	Europe
Miocene	Loretto Locality	Austria	Europe
Miocene	Mauer Locality	Austria	Europe
Miocene	Mannersdorf am Leithagebirge Locality	Austria	Europe
Miocene	Mödling Locality	Austria	Europe
Miocene	Möllersdorf Locality	Austria	Europe
Miocene	Müllendorf Locality	Austria	Europe
Miocene	Nußdorf Locality	Austria	Europe
Miocene	Neusielder Locality	Austria	Europe
Miocene	Pools bei Wildon Locality	Austria	Europe
Miocene	Ruchstallbrunngraben Locality	Austria	Europe
Miocene	Schärding am Inn Locality	Austria	Europe
Miocene	Siegendorf Locality	Austria	Europe
Miocene	Söß Locality	Austria	Europe
Miocene	Steinberg bei Zisterdorf Locality	Austria	Europe
Miocene	Steinebrunn Locality	Austria	Europe
Miocene	Steirisches Locality	Austria	Europe
Miocene	Stotzing Locality	Austria	Europe
Miocene	St. Margarethen in Ungarn Locality	Austria	Europe
Miocene	Türkenschanze Locality	Austria	Europe
Miocene	Walbersdorf Locality	Austria	Europe
Miocene	Wöllersdorf Locality	Austria	Europe
Miocene	Unknown	Austria	Europe
Miocene	Unknown	Austria	Europe
Miocene	Unknown	Austria	Europe
Miocene	Unknown	Austria	Europe
Miocene	Unknown	Austria	Europe
Miocene	Unknown	Austria	Europe
Miocene	Unknown	Austria	Europe
Miocene	Unknown	Austria	Europe
Miocene	Unknown	Austria	Europe
Miocene	Unknown	Austria	Europe
Miocene	Unknown	Austria	Europe
Miocene	Unknown	Austria	Europe
Miocene	Berchem Formation	Belgium	Europe
Miocene	Marroli Locality	Cyprus	Europe
Miocene	Hrušky Formation	Czech Republic	Europe
Miocene	Gram Formation	Denmark	Europe
Miocene	Molasses de l'Armagnac Formation	France	Europe
Miocene	Passac Formation	France	Europe
Miocene	Sables des Landes Formation	France	Europe
Miocene	Aquitaine Basin	France	Europe
Miocene	Cabrières-d'Aigues Locality	France	Europe
Miocene	Channay-sur-Lathan Locality	France	Europe
Miocene	Dax Locality	France	Europe
Miocene	Escalette Locality	France	Europe
Miocene	Grand Morier Locality	France	Europe
Miocene	Lublé Locality	France	Europe
Miocene	Loupian Locality	France	Europe
Miocene	Moulin De Débat Locality	France	Europe
Miocene	Vallon Du Minoy Locality	France	Europe
Miocene	Lower Mica Fine Sand Formation	Germany	Europe
Miocene	Mayence Basin	Germany	Europe
Miocene	Molasse Basin	Germany	Europe
Miocene	Ahaus-Alstätte Locality	Germany	Europe
Miocene	Langenfelde Locality	Germany	Europe
Miocene	Münsterländer Kiessandzug Locality	Germany	Europe
Miocene	Unknown	Germany	Europe
Miocene	Unknown	Germany	Europe
Miocene	Unknown	Germany	Europe
Miocene	Unknown	Germany	Europe
Miocene	Lusakies Locality	Greece	Europe
Miocene	Unknown	Greece	Europe
Miocene	Fretorakosi Formation	Hungary	Europe
Miocene	Olajpala Formation	Hungary	Europe
Miocene	Samsonhaza Formation	Hungary	Europe
Miocene	Pécs-Danitzpuszta Sand Pit Locality	Hungary	Europe
Miocene	Salgótarján Locality	Hungary	Europe
Miocene	Unknown	Hungary	Europe
Miocene	Unknown	Hungary	Europe
Miocene	Unknown	Hungary	Europe
Miocene	Libano Sandstone	Italy	Europe
Miocene	Pietra Leccese Formation	Italy	Europe
Miocene	Piedra de cantoni Formation	Italy	Europe
Miocene	Pantano Formation	Italy	Europe
Miocene	Unknown	Italy	Europe
Miocene	Blue Clay Formation	Malta	Europe
Miocene	Globigerina Limestone	Malta	Europe
Miocene	Ghajin Tuffieha bay Locality	Malta	Europe
Miocene	Ir-Ramla Locality	Malta	Europe
Miocene	Mtahleb Locality	Malta	Europe
Miocene	Ras Il Qammieh Locality	Malta	Europe
Miocene		Malta	Europe
Miocene	Breda Formation	Netherlands	Europe
Miocene	Aalten Member	Netherlands	Europe
Miocene	Miste Bed	Netherlands	Europe
Miocene	Stemerdink Bed	Netherlands	Europe
Miocene	Unknown	Netherlands	Europe
Miocene	Korytnica Clays	Poland	Europe
Miocene	Leitha Limestone	Poland	Europe
Miocene	Cacela Formation	Portugal	Europe
Miocene	Esbarrondadoiro Formation	Portugal	Europe
Miocene	Lagos-Portimao Formation	Portugal	Europe
Miocene	Praia Da Rocha Locality	Portugal	Europe
Miocene	Arrifao Locality	Portugal	Europe
Miocene	Praia Grande Locality	Portugal	Europe
Miocene	Unknown	Portugal	Europe
Miocene	Unknown	Portugal	Europe
Miocene	Dej Formation	Romania	Europe
Miocene	Gârbova Formation	Romania	Europe
Miocene	Cetea Locality	Romania	Europe
Miocene	Cluj-Napoca Locality	Romania	Europe
Miocene	Coasta Cea Mare Locality	Romania	Europe
Miocene	Coșteiul de Sus Locality	Romania	Europe
Miocene	Gârbova de Sus Locality	Romania	Europe
Miocene	Lăpingu de Sus Locality	Romania	Europe
Miocene	Leitha Limestone	Romania	Europe
Miocene	Valea Lupuli Locality	Romania	Europe
Miocene	Pannonian Basin	Serbia	Europe
Miocene	Filakovo Formation	Slovakia	Europe
Miocene	Dobrna Ostrožno Locality	Slovenia	Europe
Miocene	Dolenje Vrhpolje Locality	Slovenia	Europe
Miocene	Govice Locality	Slovenia	Europe
Miocene	Laško Locality	Slovenia	Europe
Miocene	Lipoviča-Briše Locality	Slovenia	Europe
Miocene	Moraviče Locality	Slovenia	Europe
Miocene	Okolica Kaminka Locality	Slovenia	Europe
Miocene	Orehovica Locality	Slovenia	Europe
Miocene	Rejte-Plesko Locality	Slovenia	Europe
Miocene	Šmarjeta Locality	Slovenia	Europe
Miocene	Trbovlje Locality	Slovenia	Europe
Miocene	Virštanj Locality	Slovenia	Europe
Miocene	Zagorje Locality	Slovenia	Europe
Miocene	Zgornji Štrihovec Locality	Slovenia	Europe
Miocene	Zgornje Podgorje Locality	Slovenia	Europe
Miocene	Arjona Formation	Spain	Europe
Miocene	Calcarenites of Sant Elm	Spain	Europe
Miocene	Guadalquivir Basin	Spain	Europe
Miocene	El Chorrillo Outcrop	Spain	Europe
Miocene	Haza de los Bodegones Site	Spain	Europe
Miocene	Unknown	Spain	Europe
Miocene	Unknown	Spain	Europe
Miocene	Unknown	Spain	Europe
Miocene	Saray Locality	Turkey	Europe
Miocene	Mykolaiv Sands Formation	Ukraine	Europe
Miocene	Alachua Formation	United States	North America
Miocene	Arcadia Formation	United States	North America
Miocene	Bruce Creek Formation	United States	North America
Miocene	Capistrano Formation	United States	North America
Miocene	Calvert Formation	United States	North America
Miocene	Choptank Formation	United States	North America
Miocene	Duplin Formation	United States	North America
Miocene	Fernando Formation	United States	North America
Miocene	Imperial Formation	United States	North America
Miocene	Monterey Formation	United States	North America
Miocene	Puente Formation	United States	North America
Miocene	Purisima Formation	United States	North America
Miocene	Pungo River Formation	United States	North America
Miocene	San Mateo Formation	United States	North America
Miocene	Santa Margarita Formation	United States	North America
Miocene	St. Marys Formation	United States	North America
Miocene	Statenville Formation	United States	North America
Miocene	Temblor Formation	United States	North America
Miocene	Topanga Formation	United States	North America
Miocene	Torreya Formation	United States	North America
Miocene	Bone Valley Formation	United States	North America
Miocene	Kirkwood Formation	United States	North America
Miocene	Blue Run Mine Locality	United States	North America
Miocene	Brooksville Phosphate Mine Locality	United States	North America
Miocene	Dunnellon Locality	United States	North America
Miocene	Green Cove Springs Locality	United States	North America
Miocene	Melrose Locality	United States	North America
Miocene	Newberry Locality	United States	North America
Miocene	Unknown	United States	North America
Miocene	Unknown	United States	North America
Miocene	Unknown	United States	North America
Miocene	Unknown	United States	North America
Miocene	Unknown	United States	North America
Miocene	Unknown	United States	North America
Miocene	Unknown	United States	North America
Miocene	Unknown	United States	North America
Miocene	Unknown	United States	North America
Miocene	Bissex Hill Locality	Barbados	North America
Miocene	Cojímar Formation	Cuba	North America
Miocene	Punta Caballo Formation	Costa Rica	North America
Miocene	Unknown	Costa Rica	North America
Miocene	Kendance Formation	Grenada	North America
Miocene	Unknown	Jamaica	North America
Miocene	Aymamón Limestone	Puerto Rico	North America
Miocene	Almejas Formation	Mexico	North America
Miocene	Carrillo Puerto Formation	Mexico	North America
Miocene	Rosarito Beach Formation	Mexico	North America
Miocene	Tortugas Formation	Mexico	North America
Miocene	Trinidad Formation	Mexico	North America
Miocene	Tulijá Formation	Mexico	North America
Miocene	Ysidro Formation	Mexico	North America
Miocene	Chiapas Locality	Mexico	North America
Miocene	Tabasco Locality	Mexico	North America
Miocene	Veracruz Locality	Mexico	North America
Miocene	Unknown	Mexico	North America
Miocene	Unknown	Martinique	North America
Miocene	Alajuela Formation	Panama	North America
Miocene	Chagres Formation	Panama	North America
Miocene	Chucunaque Formation	Panama	North America
Miocene	Gatún Formation	Panama	North America
Miocene	Phophate Chalk Formation	Bonaire	North America
Miocene	Nariva Formation	Trinidad and Tobago	North America
Miocene	Unknown	Trinidad and Tobago	North America
Miocene	Paraná Formation	Argentina	South America
Miocene	Pirabas Formation	Brazil	South America
Miocene	Bahía Inglesa Formation	Chile	South America
Miocene	Coquimbo Formation	Chile	South America
Miocene	Unknown	Chile	South America
Miocene	Castilletes Formation	Colombia	South America
Miocene	Jimol Formation	Colombia	South America
Miocene	Miramar Formation	Peru	South America
Miocene	Pisco Formation	Peru	South America
Miocene	Laguna Seca Locality	Peru	South America
Miocene	Ocuaje Locality	Peru	South America
Miocene	Camacho Formation	Uruguay	South America
Miocene	Punta del Diablo Formation	Uruguay	South America
Miocene	Cantaure Formation	Venezuela	South America
Miocene	Castillo Formation	Venezuela	South America
Miocene	Caujarao Formation	Venezuela	South America
Miocene	Socorro Formation	Venezuela	South America
Miocene	Urumaco Formation	Venezuela	South America
Miocene	Cape Range Group	Australia	Oceania
Miocene	Batesford Limestone	Australia	Oceania
Miocene	Black Rock Sandstone	Australia	Oceania
Miocene	Gambier Formation	Australia	Ocean
Miocene	Gippsland Limestone	Australia	Oceania
Miocene	Mannum Formation	Australia	Oceania
Miocene	Morgan Limestone	Australia	Oceania
Miocene	Port Campbell Limestone	Australia	Oceania
Miocene	Blanchtown Locality	Australia	Oceania
Miocene	Lake Bonney Locality	Australia	Oceania
Miocene	Point McDonnell Locality	Australia	Oceania
Miocene	Unknown	Australia	Oceania
Miocene	Cape Foulwind Locality	New Zealand	Oceania
Miocene	Hangaroa Locality	New Zealand	Oceania
Miocene	Ihungia Stream Locality	New Zealand	Oceania
Miocene	Weka Pass Locality	New Zealand	Oceania
Miocene	Unknown	Atlantic Ocean	
Miocene	Unknown	Atlantic Ocean	
Unknown	Unknown	Indian Ocean	
Unknown	Unknown	Pacific Ocean	
Unknown	Unknown	Pacific Ocean	
Unknown	Unknown	Pacific Ocean	
Unknown	Unknown	Pacific Ocean	
Unknown	Unknown	Pacific Ocean	
Unknown	Unknown	Pacific Ocean	
Unknown	Unknown	Pacific Ocean	
Unknown	Unknown	Indonesia	Asia
Unknown	Unknown	Norway	Europe
Unknown	Unknown	Spain	Europe
Unknown	Unknown	Spain	Europe
Unknown	Unknown	Spain	Europe
Unknown	Unknown	United States	North America
Unknown	Unknown	United States	North America
Unknown	Unknown	United States	North America
Unknown	Unknown	United States	North America
Unknown	Unknown	United States	North America
Unknown	Unknown	United States	North America
Unknown	Unknown	United States	North America
Unknown	Saloum Formation	Senegal	Africa
Unknown	Maribojoc Locality	Philippines	Asia
Unknown	Pangasinan Locality	Philippines	Asia
Unknown	Miura Group	Japan	Asia
Unknown	Yachi Formation	Japan	Asia
Unknown	Miyakojima Locality	Japan	Asia
Unknown	Mill-Langenboom Locality	Netherlands	Europe
Unknown	Pobla de Montornés Locality	Spain	Europe
Unknown	Hogtown Group	United States	North America
Unknown	Coosawhatchie Formation	United States	North America
Unknown	Ft. Caroline Sandpit Locality	United States	North America
Unknown	Jenkens Creek Locality	United States	North America
Unknown	Three Lakes Creek Locality	United States	North America
Unknown	Venice Beach Locality	United States	North America
Unknown	Codore Formation	Venezuela	South America
Unknown	Suva Locality	Fiji	Oceania
Unknown	Cobley's Creek Locality	New Zealand	Oceania

Locations of some megalodon fossil discoveries, yellow denotes fossils from the Pliocene, blue denotes fossils from the Miocene and green denotes fossils of uncertain age

=== Competition ===
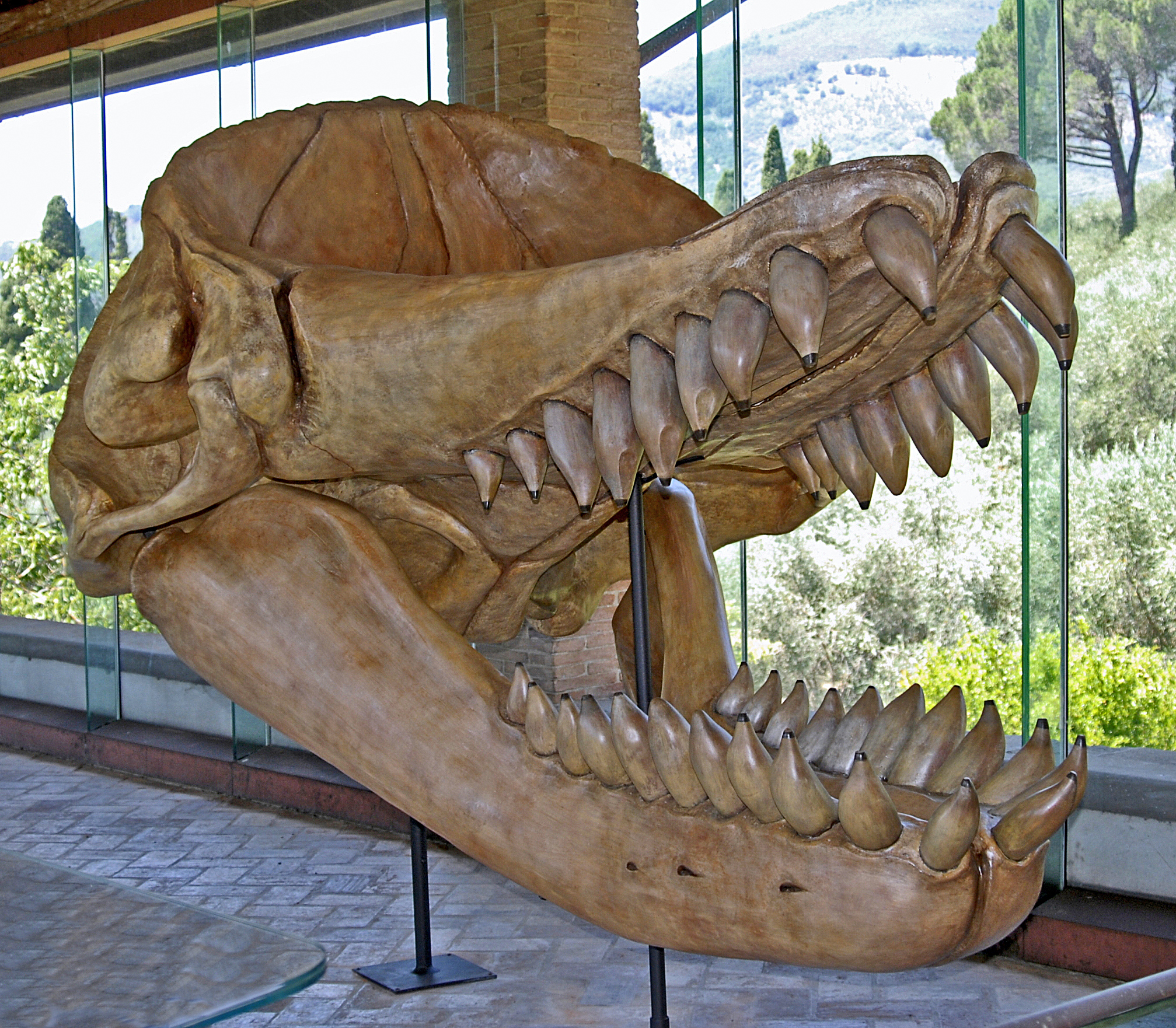
Megalodon may have faced competition from macroraptorial sperm whales, such as Livyatan (above).

Megalodon faced a highly competitive environment. Its position at the top of the food chain probably had a significant impact on the structuring of marine communities. Fossil evidence indicates a correlation between megalodon and the emergence and diversification of cetaceans and other marine mammals. Juvenile megalodon preferred habitats where small cetaceans were abundant, and adult megalodon preferred habitats where large cetaceans were abundant. Such preferences may have developed shortly after they appeared in the Oligocene.

Megalodon were contemporaneous with whale-eating toothed whales (particularly macroraptorial sperm whales and squalodontidae), which were also probably among the era's apex predators, and provided competition. Some attained gigantic sizes, such as Livyatan, estimated between 13.5 to 17.5 meters (44 to 57 ft). Fossilized teeth of an undetermined species of such physeteroids from Lee Creek Mine, North Carolina, indicate it had a maximum body length of 8 to 10 m (26 to 33 ft) and a maximum lifespan of about 25 years. This is very different from similarly sized modern killer whales that live to 65 years, suggesting that unlike the latter, which are apex predators, these physeteroids were subject to predation from larger species such as megalodon or Livyatan. Additionally, megalodon likely preyed on macroraptorial raptorial sperm whales such as Zygophyseter, which may suggest that it occupied a higher trophic level than extant apex predators, which is supported by calcium isotopic analysis.

By the Late Miocene, around 11 Mya, macroraptorials experienced a significant decline in abundance and diversity, leading to reduced competition. Traditionally it was assumed that cetaceans posed increased competition during the Pliocene due to the evolution of highly social, pack-hunting Orcinus, but this is now considered questionable as the oldest known species of Orcinus, Orcinus citoniensis, was specialized for preying on small fishes and cephalopods rather than pack hunting of marine mammals.

Megalodon may have subjected contemporaneous white sharks to competitive exclusion, as the fossil records indicate that other shark species avoided regions it inhabited by mainly keeping to the colder waters. In areas where their ranges seemed to have overlapped, such as in Pliocene Baja California, it is possible that megalodon and the great white shark occupied the area at different times of the year while following different migratory prey. Megalodon probably also had a tendency for cannibalism, much like contemporary sharks.

A 2024 study described 4 megalodon teeth from multiple different formations from the United States with serrated bite marks charcteristic of the ichnotaxon Knethichnus parallum. These bite marks were made by another megalodon tooth and were either accidentally self-inflicted or were due to intraspecific competition with or cannibalism by another megalodon individual.

== Extinction ==
=== Climate change ===
The Earth experienced a number of changes during the time period megalodon existed which affected marine life. A cooling trend starting in the Oligocene 35 Mya ultimately led to glaciation at the poles. Geological events changed currents and precipitation; among these were the closure of the Central American Seaway and changes in the Tethys Ocean, contributing to the cooling of the oceans. The stalling of the Gulf Stream prevented nutrient-rich water from reaching major marine ecosystems, which may have negatively affected its food sources. The largest fluctuation of sea levels in the Cenozoic era occurred in the Plio-Pleistocene, between around 5 million to 12 thousand years ago, due to the expansion of glaciers at the poles, which negatively impacted coastal environments, and may have contributed to its extinction along with those of several other marine megafaunal species. These oceanographic changes, in particular the sea level drops, may have restricted many of the suitable shallow warm-water nursery sites for megalodon, hindering reproduction. Nursery areas are pivotal for the survival of many shark species, in part because they protect juveniles from predation.

As its range did not apparently extend into colder waters, megalodon may not have been able to retain a significant amount of metabolic heat, so its range was restricted to shrinking warmer waters. Fossil evidence confirms the absence of megalodon in regions around the world where water temperatures had significantly declined during the Pliocene. However, an analysis of the distribution of megalodon over time suggests that temperature change did not play a direct role in its extinction. Its distribution during the Miocene and Pliocene did not correlate with warming and cooling trends; while abundance and distribution declined during the Pliocene, megalodon did show a capacity to inhabit colder latitudes. It was found in locations with a mean temperature ranging from 12 to 27 °C (54 to 81 °F), with a total range of 1 to 33 °C (34 to 91 °F), indicating that the global extent of suitable habitat should not have been greatly affected by the temperature changes that occurred. This is consistent with evidence that it was a mesotherm.

=== Changing ecosystem ===
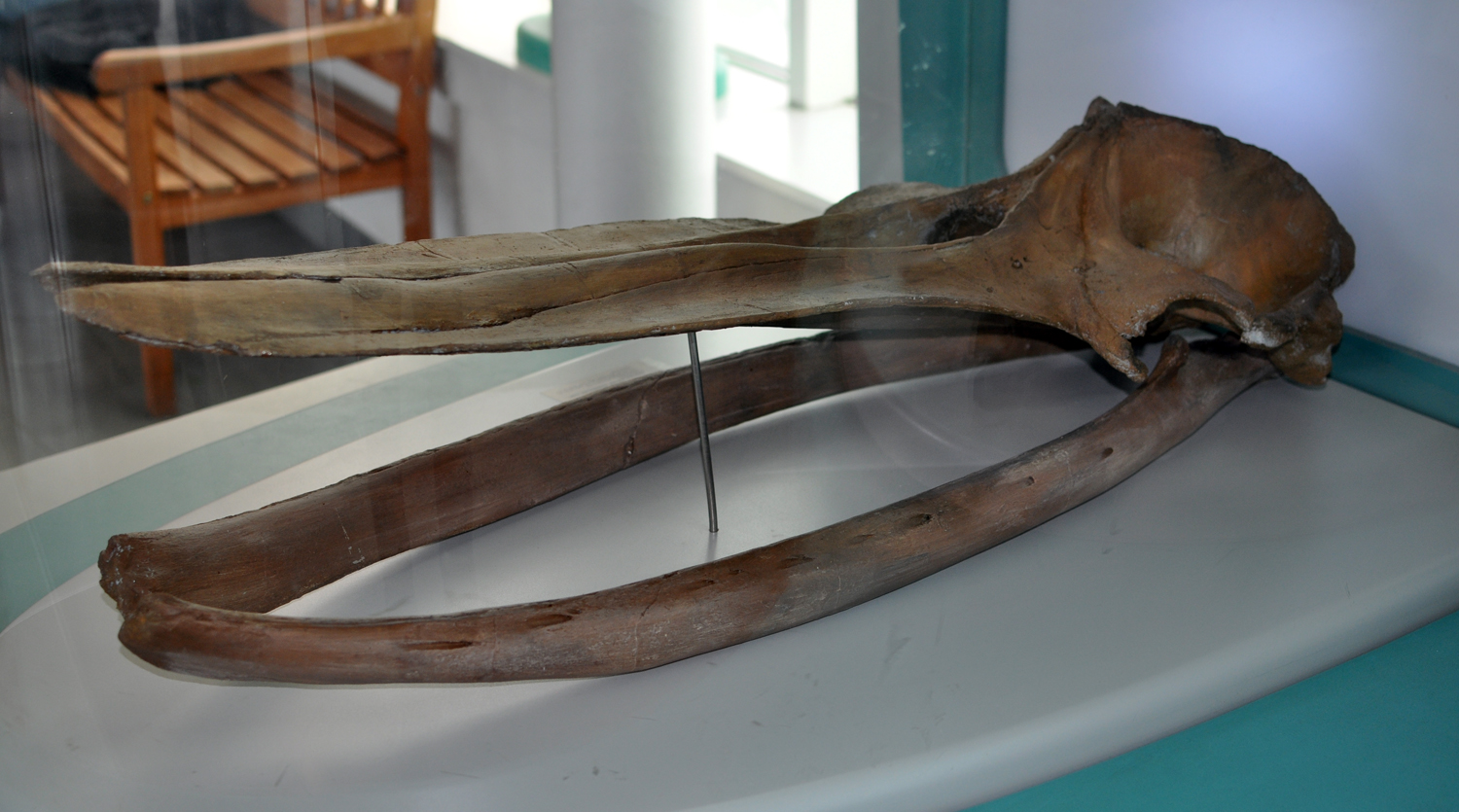
Megalodon may have become coextinct with smaller baleen whale species, such as Piscobalaena nana.

Marine mammals attained greatest diversity during the Miocene, such as with baleen whales with over 20 recognized Miocene genera in comparison to only six extant genera. Such diversity presented an ideal setting to support a super-predator such as megalodon. By the end of the Miocene, many species of mysticetes had gone extinct; surviving species may have been faster swimmers and thus more elusive prey. Furthermore, after the closure of the Central American Seaway, tropical whales decreased in diversity and abundance. The extinction of megalodon correlates with the decline of many small mysticete lineages, and it is possible that it was highly dependent on them as a food source. Additionally, a marine megafauna extinction during the Pliocene was discovered to have eliminated 36% of all large marine species including 55% of marine mammals, 35% of seabirds, 9% of sharks, and 43% of sea turtles. The extinction was selective for endotherms and mesotherms relative to poikilotherms, implying causation by a decreased food supply and thus consistent with megalodon being mesothermic. Megalodon may have been too large to sustain itself on the declining marine food resources. The cooling of the oceans during the Pliocene might have restricted the access of megalodon to the polar regions, depriving it of the large whales which had migrated there.

Traditionally, competition from large odontocetes, such as macropredatory sperm whales or genus Orcinus (i.e., Orcinus citoniensis) in the Pliocene, was assumed to have contributed to the decline and extinction of megalodon. But this assumption is disputed due to being based on unsupported assumptions about when cetacean competitors were present: The Orcininae emerged in mid-Pliocene with O. citoniensis reported from the Pliocene of Italy, and similar forms reported from the Pliocene of England and South Africa, indicating the capacity of these dolphins to cope with increasingly prevalent cold water temperatures in high latitudes. These dolphins were assumed to have been macrophagous in some studies, but it was found that early Orcinus were not macrophagous and fed on small fishes instead, thus posing minimal competition with even neonate O. megalodon. On the other hand, giant macropredatory sperm whales such as Livyatan-like forms are last reported from Australia and South Africa circa 5 million years ago, and smaller macroraptorial sperm whales like Acrophyseter also last appear in the fossil record at around this time, indicating that macroraptorial sperm whales died out earlier than O. megalodon. Certain physeteroids such as Hoplocetus and Scaldicetus survived longer into the Pliocene, but only the Miocene species attributed to these genera are considered macroraptorial. Members of genus Orcinus became large and macrophagous only in the Pleistocene, well after the extinction of O. megalodon.

Paleontologist Robert Boessenecker and his colleagues reanalyzed the fossil record of megalodon using a statistical model to calculate an estimated extinction date of circa 3.51 million years ago. Boessenecker and his colleagues further suggest that megalodon suffered range fragmentation due to climatic shifts, and competition with modern white sharks, rather than any macroraptorial cetacean, might have contributed to its decline and extinction. Competition with white sharks is assumed to be a factor in other studies as well, but this hypothesis warrants further testing. Multiple compounding environmental and ecological factors including climate change and thermal limitations, collapse of prey populations and resource competition with white sharks are believed to have contributed to decline and extinction of megalodon. Some experts argued given the long coexistence of Otodus and Carcharodon lineages despite competition for high trophic prey, competition probably played a smaller role in its extinction compared to abiotic and other biotic factors such as range fragmentation, cooling climate, and decline of cetacean diversity.

The extinction of megalodon set the stage for further changes in marine communities. The average body size of baleen whales increased significantly after its disappearance, although possibly due to other, climate-related, causes. Conversely the increase in baleen whale size may have contributed to the extinction of megalodon, as they may have preferred to go after smaller whales; bite marks on large whale species may have come from scavenging sharks. Megalodon may have simply become coextinct with smaller whale species, such as Piscobalaena nana. The extinction of megalodon had a positive impact on other apex predators of the time, such as the great white shark, in some cases spreading to regions where megalodon became absent.

== In popular culture ==
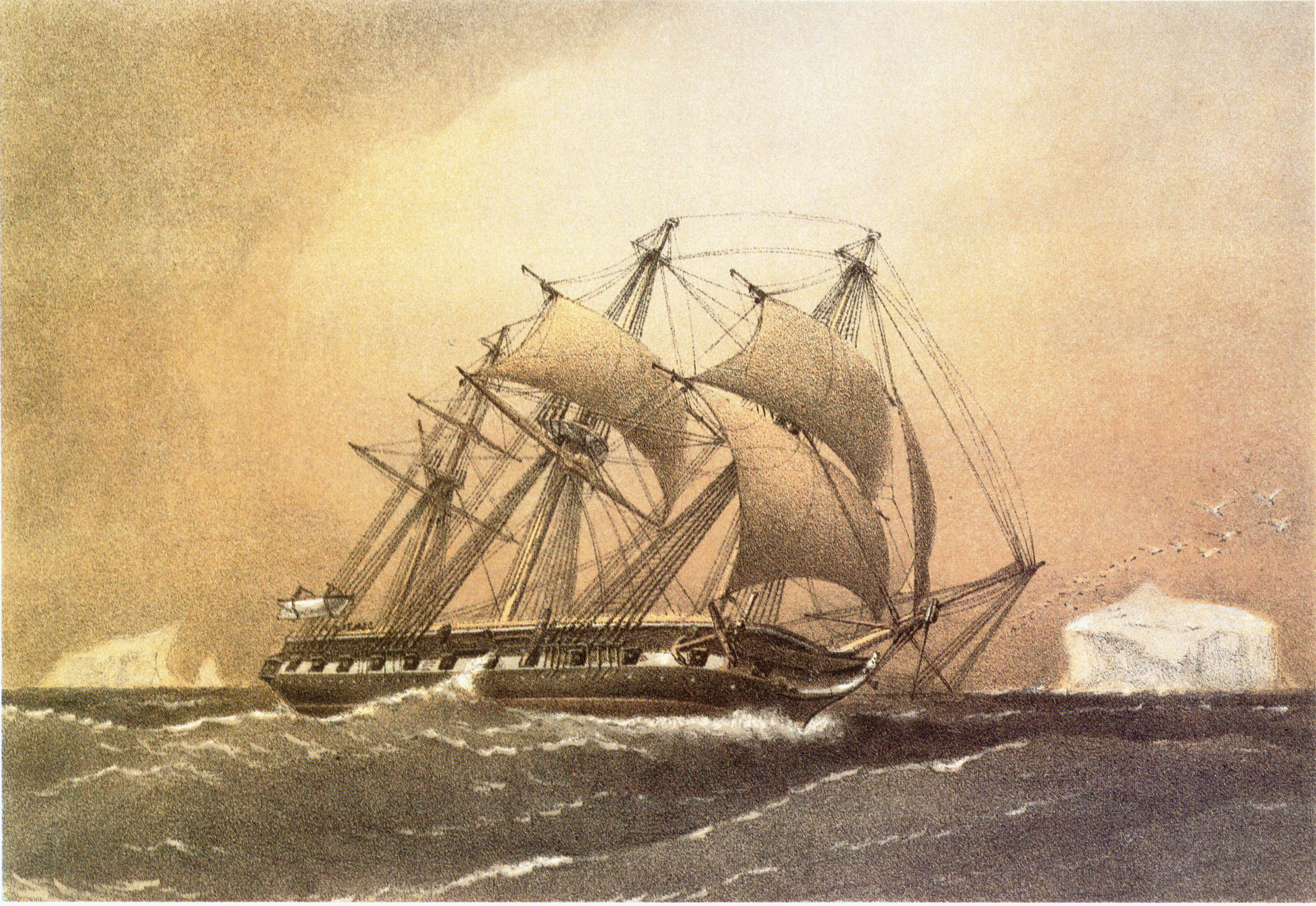
HMS Challenger discovered megalodon teeth which were erroneously dated to be around 11,000 to 24,000 years old.

Megalodon has been portrayed in many works of fiction, including films and novels, and continues to be a popular subject for fiction involving sea monsters. Reports of supposedly fresh megalodon teeth, such as those found by HMS Challenger in 1873 which were dated in 1959 by the zoologist Wladimir Tschernezky to be around 11,000 to 24,000 years old, helped popularise claims of recent megalodon survival amongst cryptozoologists. These claims have been discredited, and are probably teeth that were well-preserved by a thick mineral-crust precipitate of manganese dioxide, and so had a lower decomposition rate and retained a white color during fossilization. Fossil megalodon teeth can vary in color from off-white to dark browns, greys, and blues, and some fossil teeth may have been redeposited into a younger stratum. The claims that megalodon could remain elusive in the depths, similar to the megamouth shark which was discovered in 1976, are unlikely as the shark lived in warm coastal waters and probably could not survive in the cold and nutrient-poor deep sea environment. Alleged sightings of the megalodon have been noted to be likely hoaxes or misidentifications of the whale shark, which shared many visual characteristics with megalodon sightings.

Contemporary fiction about megalodon surviving into modern times was pioneered by the 1997 novel Meg: A Novel of Deep Terror by Steve Alten and its subsequent sequels. Megalodon subsequently began to feature in films, such as the 2002 direct to video Shark Attack 3: Megalodon, and later The Meg, a 2018 film based on the 1997 book which grossed over $500 million at the box office.

Animal Planet's pseudo-documentary Mermaids: The Body Found included an encounter 1.6 Mya between a pod of mermaids and a megalodon. Later, in August 2013, the Discovery Channel opened its annual Shark Week series with another film for television, Megalodon: The Monster Shark Lives, a controversial docufiction about the creature that presented alleged evidence in order to suggest that megalodons still lived. This program received criticism for being completely fictional and for inadequately disclosing its fictional nature; for example, all of the supposed scientists depicted were paid actors, and there was no disclosure in the documentary itself that it was fictional. In a poll by Discovery, 73% of the viewers of the documentary thought that megalodon was not extinct. In 2014, Discovery re-aired The Monster Shark Lives, along with a new one-hour program, Megalodon: The New Evidence, and an additional fictionalized program entitled Shark of Darkness: Wrath of Submarine, resulting in further backlash from media sources and the scientific community. Despite the criticism from scientists, Megalodon: The Monster Shark Lives was a huge ratings success, gaining 4.8 million viewers, the most for any Shark Week episode up to that point.

Megalodon is the official state shark of Maryland. Megalodon teeth are the state fossil of North Carolina.

== See also ==
- List of prehistoric cartilaginous fish
- Largest prehistoric organisms
