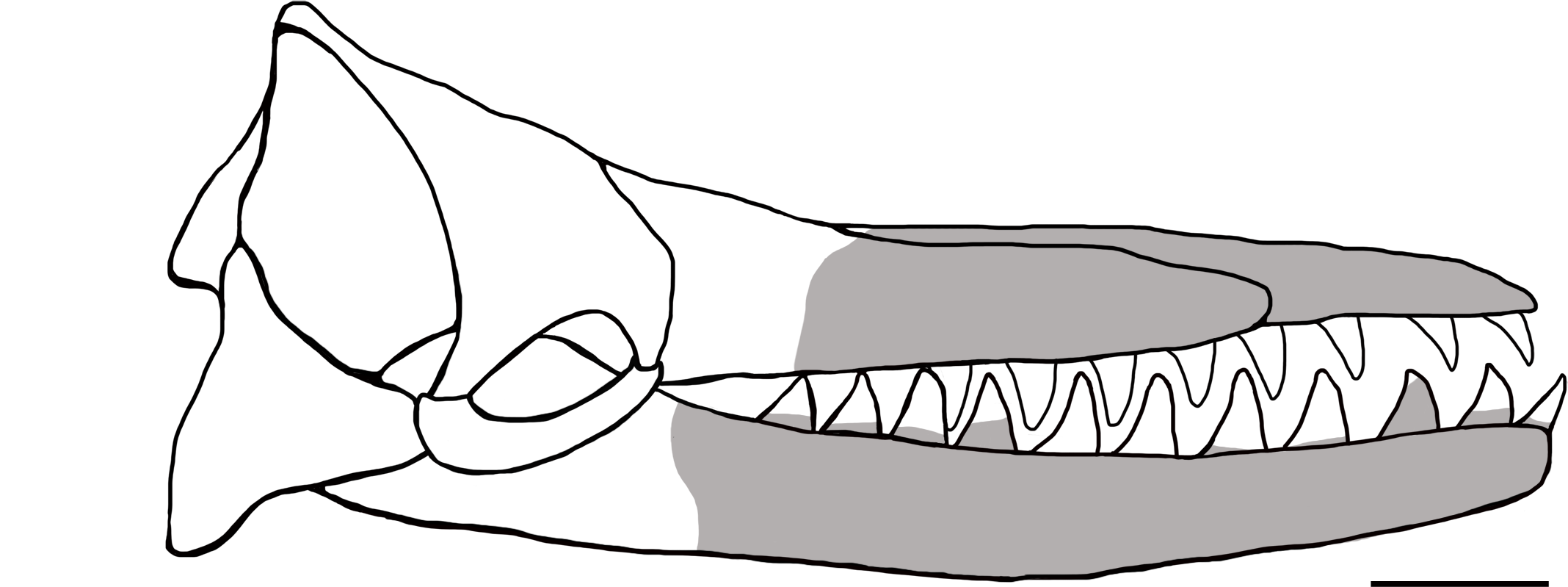
- Reconstruction of skull

Scientific classification
- Kingdom: Animalia
- Phylum: Chordata
- Class: Mammalia
- Order: Artiodactyla
- Infraorder: Cetacea
- Parvorder: Odontoceti
- Superfamily: Physeteroidea
- Genus: †Albicetus; Boersma & Pyenson, 2015
- Species: †A. oxymycterus

Binomial name
- †Albicetus oxymycterus (Kellogg, 1925)

Synonyms
- Ontocetus oxymycterus Kellogg, 1925; Scaldicetus oxymycterus (Kellogg, 1925)

= Albicetus =

Albicetus Temporal range: Langhian ~16–14 Ma

Extinct genus of mammals

Albicetus is a genus of stem-sperm whales that lived during the Miocene Epoch, around 15 million years ago, and was discovered in Santa Barbara, California in 1909. It was categorized for decades as belonging to a group of extinct walruses erroneously thought to be sperm whales. It was named Albicetus, meaning "white whale", is a reference to the leviathan in Herman Melville's classic 1851 novel Moby-Dick. Albicetus is estimated to be to about 6 meters (20 ft) long.

== Taxonomy ==
=== Etymology ===
The genus Albicetus derives from the Latin albus "white" and cetus "whale", and so literally means "white whale". It was named in reference to the antagonist Moby Dick from Herman Melville's novel Moby-Dick. This reference was done both in honor of Melville and as a reference to the most notable traits of the Moby Dick–including an "unwonted magnitude", light color, and a crooked and deformed lower jaw–which coincidentally also describe the traits found in the Albicetus oxymycterus holotype specimen (the fossils themselves possess a light hue).

The species name oxymycterus is derived from the Ancient Greek ὀξύς oxy "sharp" and μυκτήρ mycter "nose".

=== Taxonomic history ===
The holotype was recovered from an unspecified location in the sea cliffs near the original Santa Barbara Lighthouse in 1909, which is believed to most likely be part of the Monterey Formation. The whale was originally placed in the genus Ontocetus in 1925 by American naturalist Remington Kellogg as O. oxymycterus. This genus was originally thought to represent a sperm whale, however, in 2008, the type species, Ontocetus emmonsi, was discovered to actually be a walrus. The whale was then moved to the wastebasket taxon Scaldicetus, which consists of various other (more-or-less unrelated) primitive sperm whales with enamel coated teeth. In 2015, the whale was moved to the newly erected genus Albicetus.

=== Phylogeny ===
Albicetus, unlike the modern sperm whale (Physeter macrocephalus), possessed functional and enamel-coated teeth in both jaws. This suggests that it is related to the group of macroraptorial sperm whales which includes Acrophyseter, Brygmophyseter, Livyatan, and Zygophyseter. However, Albicetus is most similar in general shape and characteristics with Aulophyseter morricei, except for the dentition in which the latter possesses only small, vestigial upper teeth lacking enamel. The closest known relative to Albicetus is currently Livyatan.

The cladogram below shows relationships between Albicetus and other physeteroids with macroraptorial sperm whales in bold

- Physeteroidea
  - †Eudelphis
  - - - †**Zygophyseter**
      - †**Brygmophyseter**
    - †**Acrophyseter**
  - - †**Livyatan**
    - †**Albicetus**
    - - † 'Aulophyseter' rionegrensis
      - - Physeteridae
          - - †Orycterocetus
            - - †Idiorophus
              - †Physeterula
          - - - - †Idiophyseter
                - - Physeter
                  - †Aulophyseter
              - †Placoziphius
            - †Diaphorocetus
        - Kogiidae
          - - †Aprixokogia
            - - - Kogia
                - †Praekogia
              - †Scaphokogia
          - †Thalassocetus

== Description ==
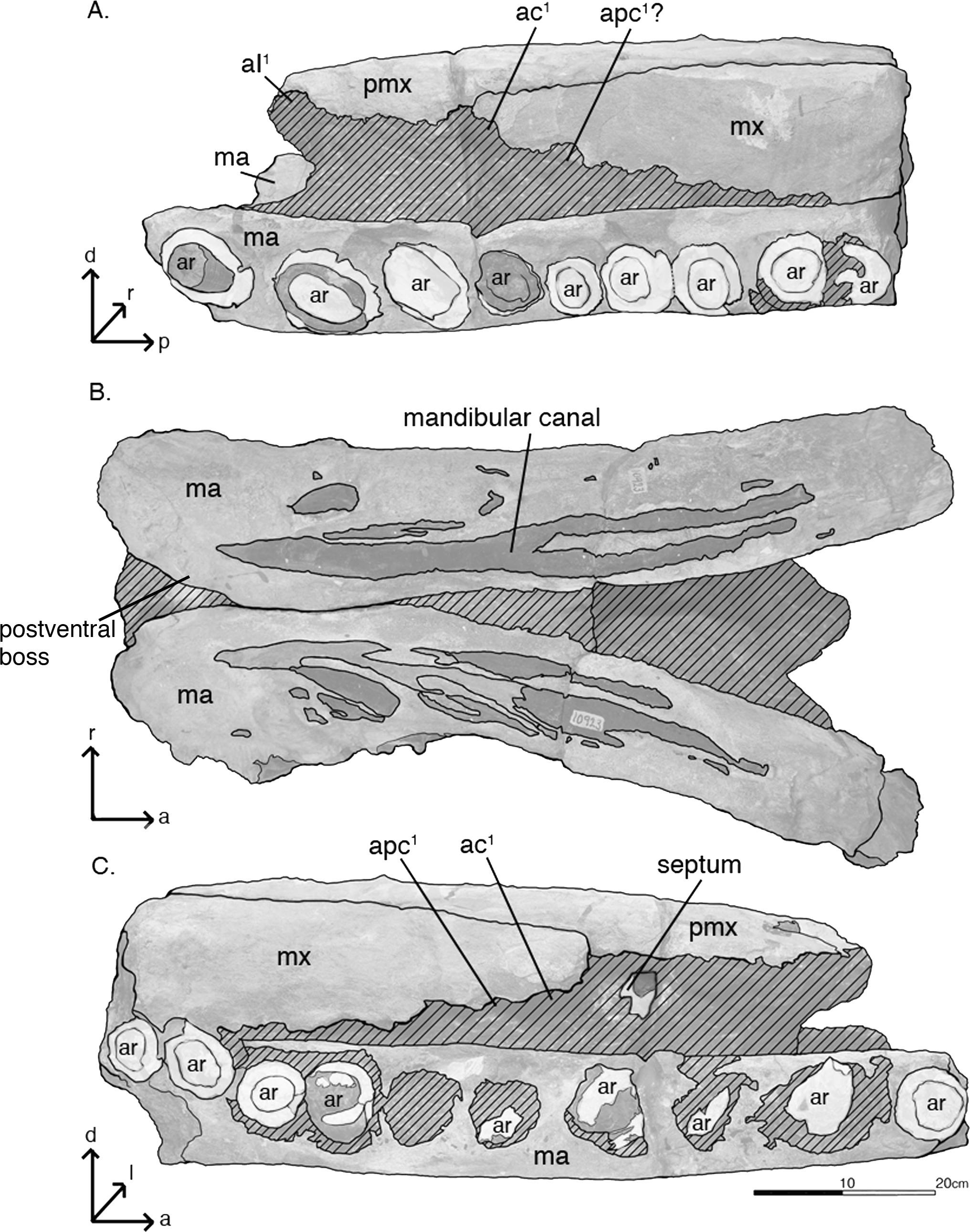
Mandible and beak of the type specimen

Albicetus was a Macroraptorial sperm whale, occupying an ecological niche similar to that of killer whales apex predator that preyed on large prey. It is thought to have primarily preyed on vertebrates such as whales, pinnipeds, and fish.

The type specimen, USNM 10923, consists of a partial skull (mainly remains of the beak) and isolated tooth fragments. Comparing the occipital condyle length with antorbital notch (slits in the skull right before the snout) width of other primitive sperm whale, the total body length is estimated to be between 5.9–6.3 m (19–21 ft). The preserved length of the beak is 81.9 cm (2.69 ft). The estimated total skull length is about 1.44 meters (4.7 ft).

=== Teeth ===
Albicetus had a maximum of 18 in either jaw, deeply rooted in exceedingly teeth large tooth sockets. Covered with thick teeth enamel reaching up to 20.5 centimeters (8.1 in) teeth. This was an adaptation to firmly grasp resisting prey with a bite and tear its flesh.

== Paleobiology ==
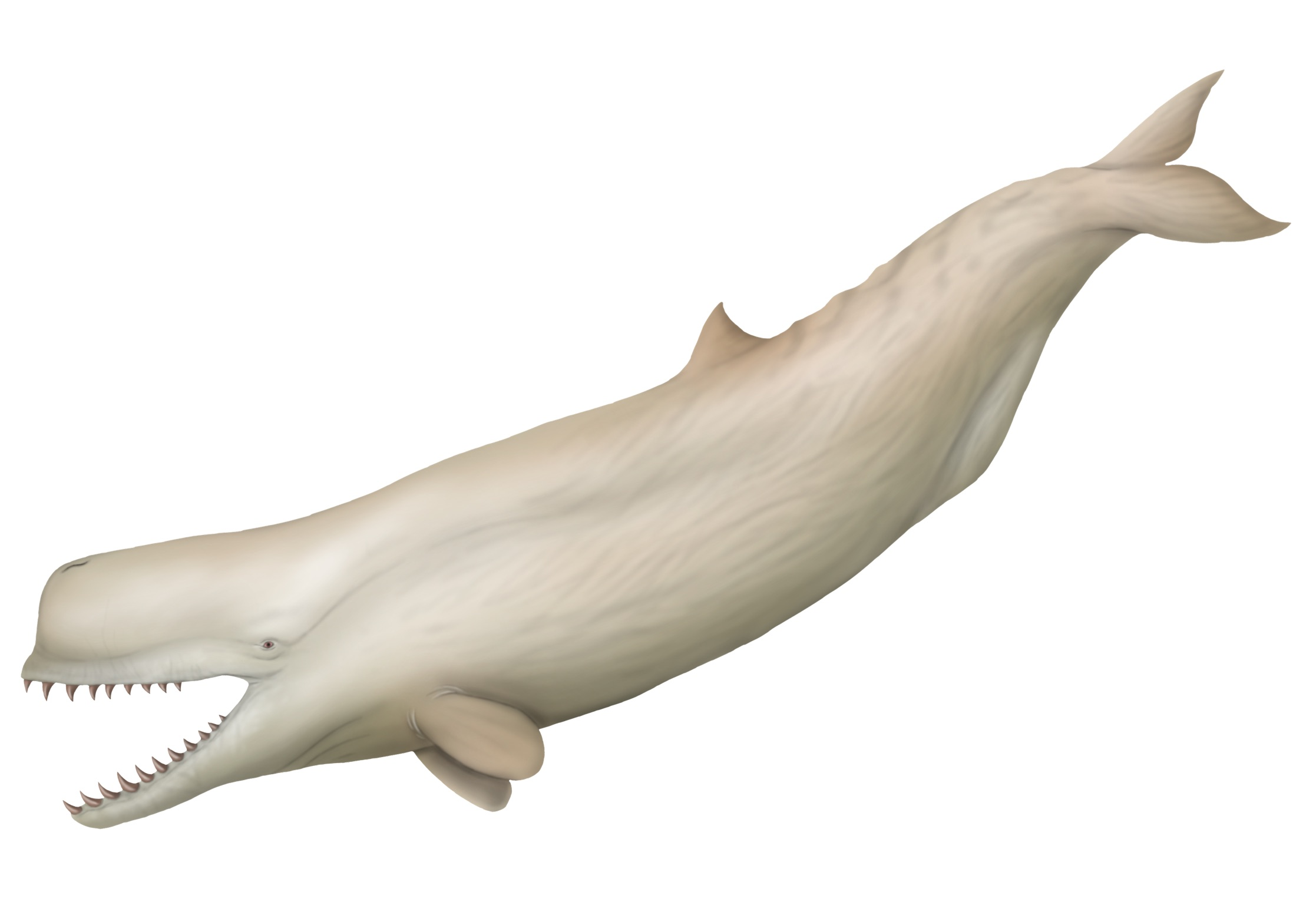
Life reconstruction

Albicetus is inferred to have been a macroraptorial predator specializing in hypercarnivorous feeding on large marine vertebrates, including small cetaceans and pinnipeds, based on its cranial morphology and dentition adapted for grasping and tearing flesh. The retention of functional, enameled teeth in both upper and lower jaws, with conical crowns and robust roots up to 20.5 cm long, indicates a biting mechanism suited for capturing and processing mobile prey such as seals or smaller whales, contrasting with the suction-feeding, squid-focused diet as seen in the modern sperm whale. This predatory specialization aligns with the high diversity of marine mammals in the middle Miocene Monterey Formation, where A. oxymycterus likely targeted abundant mid-sized vertebrates rather than soft-bodied cephalopods. This kind of macroraptorial predatory behavior is reconstructed as involving powerful jaw closure, facilitated by a structurally rigid rostrum with a closed mesorostral groove that enhanced stability during biting. The enameled tips of the teeth, featuring coarse longitudinal striations, suggest repeated occlusion and contact with hard tissues like bone or cartilage, implying a "grip-and-tear" strategy similar to that observed in coeval macroraptorial sperm whales such as Brygmophyseter. Wear patterns on preserved tooth fragments, including deep facets from tooth-to-tooth contact, further support frequent engagement with bony prey, though no direct evidence of gut contents or bite marks on associated fossils has been reported.

As an apex predator in Miocene Pacific coastal ecosystems, A. oxymycterus occupied a top trophic position, potentially competing with other physeteroids like Brygmophyseter for large vertebrate prey in nutrient-rich upwelling zones. It probably grew to be around 6 meters (20 ft) in length and hypercarnivorous adaptations positioned it as a key regulator of marine mammal populations, contributing to the diverse predatory guilds of the era alongside sharks and early pinnipeds, before the decline of such macroraptorial forms in the late Miocene.

== Paleoecology ==
For macroraptorial sperm whales, the presence of large body size along with large tooth size suggests that body size was an adaptation to hunting bigger prey, notably other marine mammals, as opposed to the modern sperm whale where size is possibly an adaptation to deep diving. The Langhian is particularly rich in sperm whale diversity, with Albicetus, Brygmophyseter, and Aulophyseter contemporaneously inhabiting the North Pacific. It is possible these sperm whales exhibited niche partitioning to avoid directly competing for food.
