= Macroraptorial sperm whale =

Predatory grouping of extinct whales

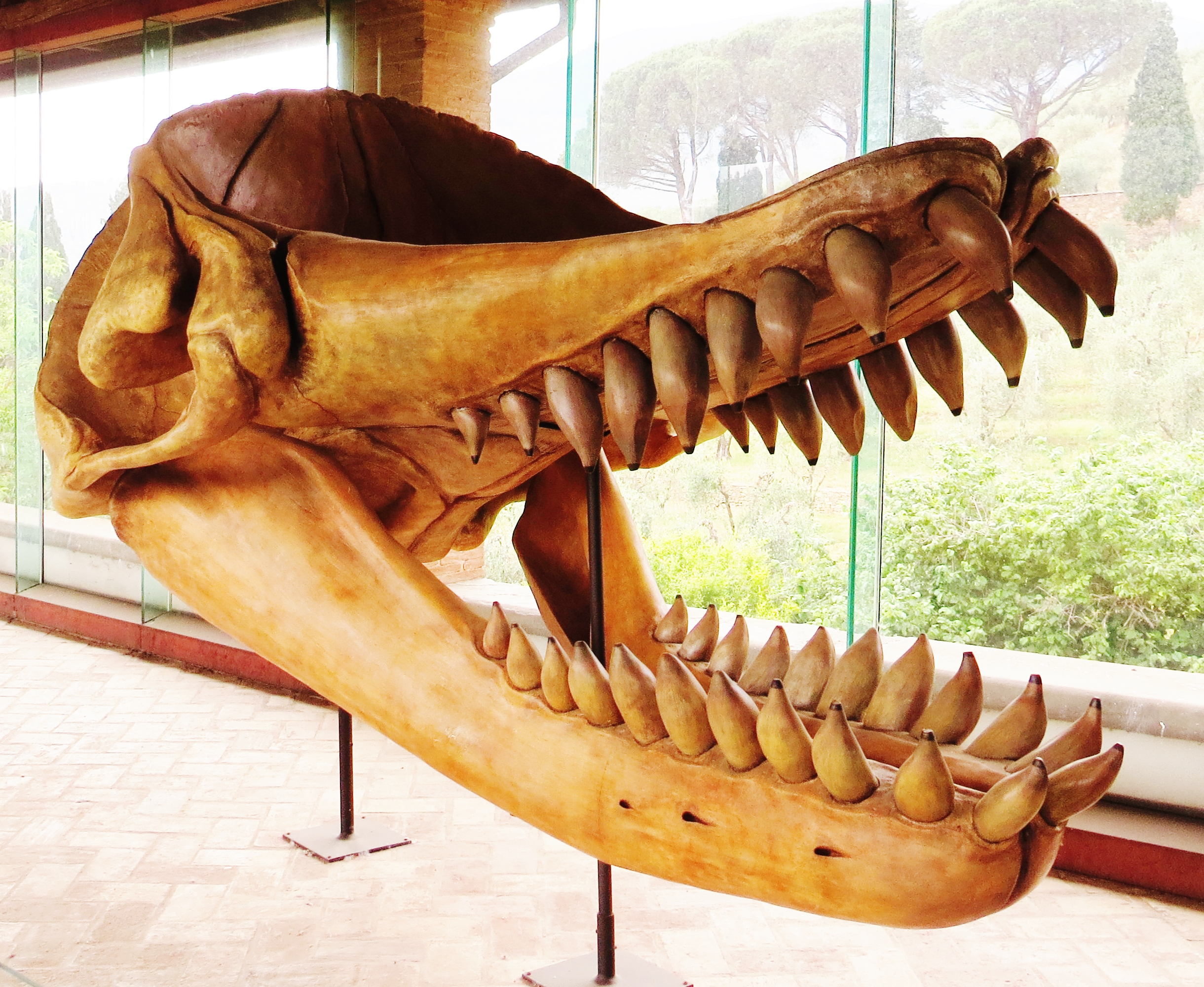
Skull of Livyatan

Macroraptorial sperm whales were highly predatory whales of the sperm whale superfamily (Physeteroidea) of the Miocene epoch that hunted large marine mammals, including other whales, using their large teeth. They consist of six genera: Acrophyseter, Albicetus, Brygmophyseter, Livyatan, Scaldicetus, and Zygophyseter. All species are known by at least a skull, and are informally grouped without a family designation. They were all likely the apex predator of their habitats, comparable to the modern day killer whale (Orcinus orca), and achieved great lengths, with one species—Livyatan—measuring about 13.5–17.5 m (44–57 ft).

== Etymology ==
The term "macroraptorial" combines the Greek prefix "macro-" ("long", "large" or "great") and "raptorial" (from Latin rapere meaning "to seize", "to grasp").

== Discovery ==
Zygophyseter was discovered in the Pietra Leccese Formation in Italy from a skull, teeth, and vertebrae; Brygmophyseter was discovered in the Bessho Formation in Japan from a nearly-complete skeleton; and Acrophyseter and Livyatan both originate from the Pisco Formation in Peru and are known by only a skull. Albicetus was discovered at the Santa Barbara Lighthouse in 1909, in what is believed to most likely be part of the Monterey Formation. It was first classified within the genus Ontocetus (now a genus of walrus), and then moved to a wastebasket taxon Scaldicetus until Boersma and his colleagues assigned a new generic name.

== Description ==
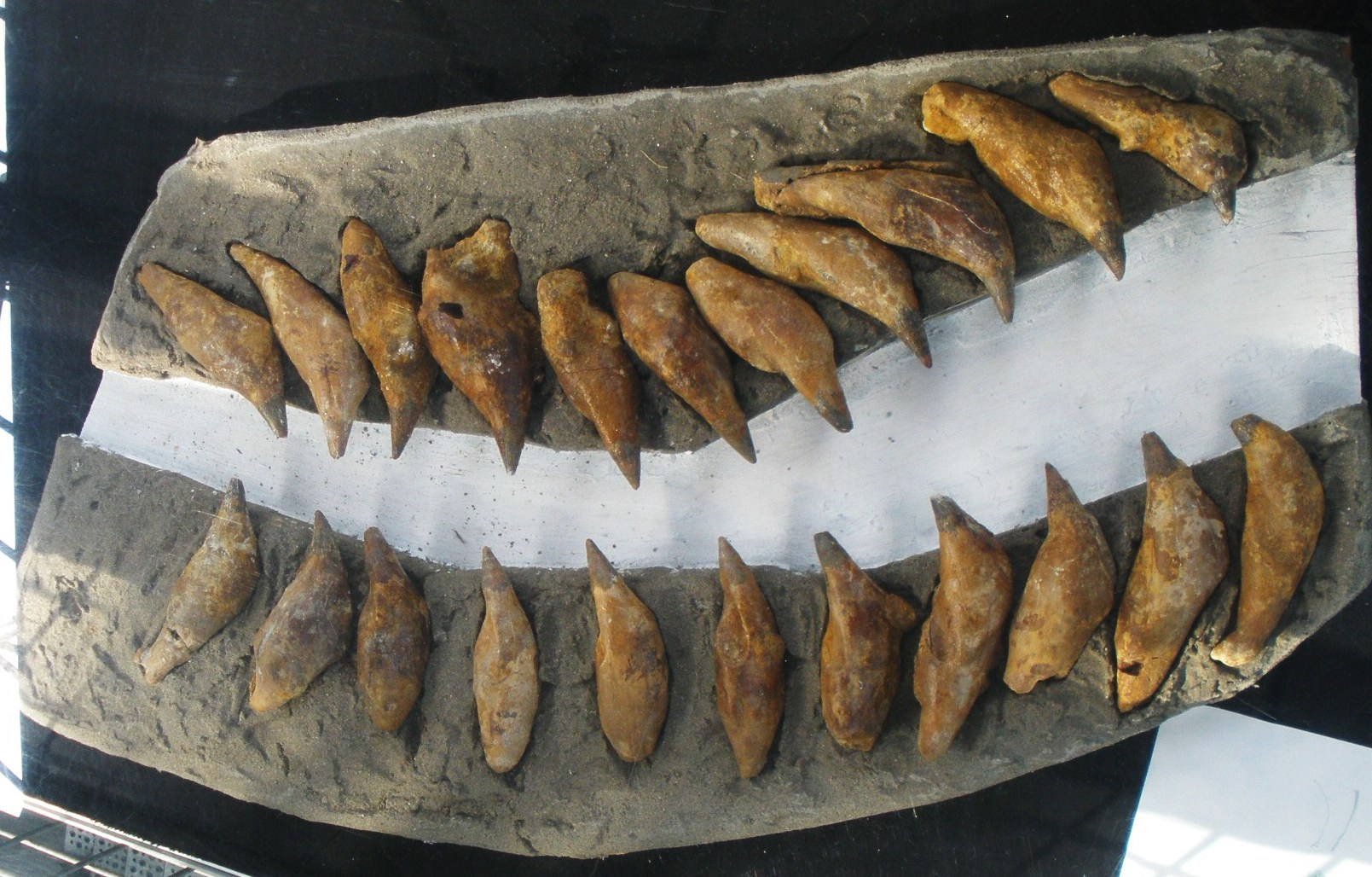
Upper and lower tooth rows of Acrophyseter

Macroraptorial body length range
| Genus | SI | Imperial |
|---|---|---|
| Acrophyseter | ≈4–4.5 m | ≈13–15 ft |
| Albicetus | ≈5.9–6.3 m | ≈19–21 ft |
| Brygmophyseter | ≈6-7 m | ≈20-23 ft |
| Zygophyseter | ≈6.5–7 m | ≈21–23 ft |
| Livyatan | ≈13.5–17.5 m | ≈44–57 ft |

Macroraptorial sperm whales had large, functional, conical teeth in both jaws, as opposed to the modern sperm whale whose teeth are small and nonfunctional in the upper jaw. The teeth were deeply rooted into the gumline and could interlock, probably to aid in holding struggling prey. The teeth of Livyatan, at a length of 36.2 cm (14.3 in), were one of the biggest teeth of any animal, excluding tusks. The macroraptorials also had well-developed muscles used in biting—the temporalis and masseter. They also developed buccal exostoses in the mouth, bony growths which act as buttresses during biting, further increasing the bite force.

Like modern sperm whales, the macroraptorials had a curved basin—the supracranial basin—on the top of the skull. This encompassed the entire breadth of the snout in Livyatan and Brygmophyseter; Zygophyseter and Acrophyseter, instead, had reduced basins indicating beaks. The elongated lumbar vertebrae of Zygophyseter indicate it had larger multifidus and longissimus back muscles and was, thus, faster than the modern sperm whale which, comparable to other large open-ocean animals, travels horizontally at 4 km/h (2.5 mph).

== Paleobiology ==
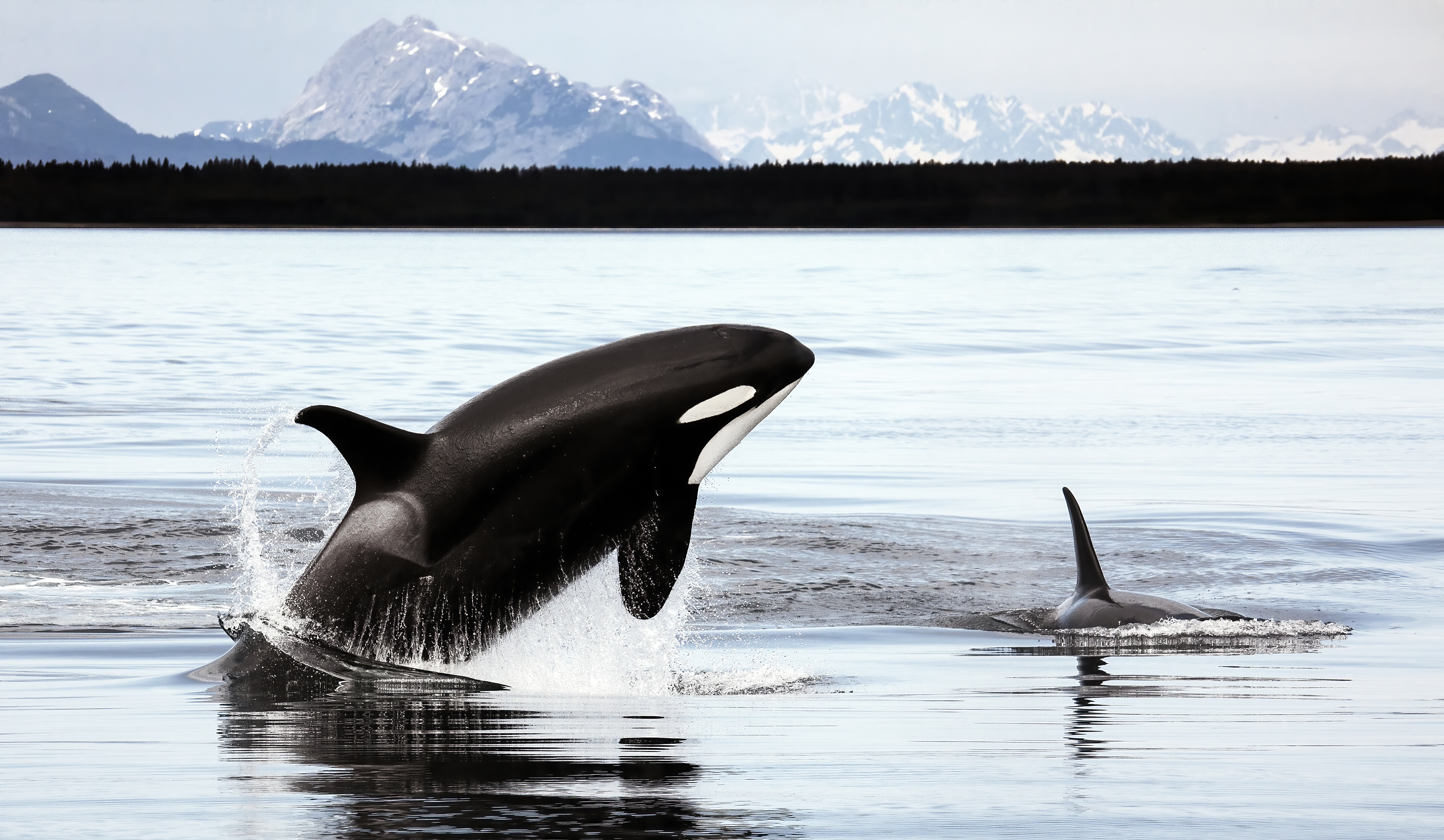
Macroraptorial sperm whales occupied the same niche as killer whales (Orcinus orca).

Using their large and deeply rooted teeth, wide-opening jaws, and great size, they likely fed on a variety of sea life, including fish, cephalopods, seals, and small whales and dolphins, occupying a niche similar to the modern day killer whale (Orcinus orca). In fact, Zygophyseter is known colloquially as the "killer sperm whale" in reference to this. Likewise, they may have employed a similar hunting strategy of pursuing prey to tire it out before eventually drowning it. However, given their size, they probably did not need to hunt in groups. Livyatan probably targeted medium-sized whales ranging in size from 7–10 m (23–33 ft). Macroraptorials probably competed with the extinct giant shark megalodon for the same food sources.

In sperm whales, the supracranial basin holds the spermaceti organ, a series of oil and wax reservoirs which aids in echolocation. Speculatively, the organ may also serve a secondary function, such as vocalizing, acoustic stunning of prey, head-butting between males, ramming into prey, or buoyancy control by increasing or decreasing the temperature of the wax to change the density and weight.

== Taxonomy ==
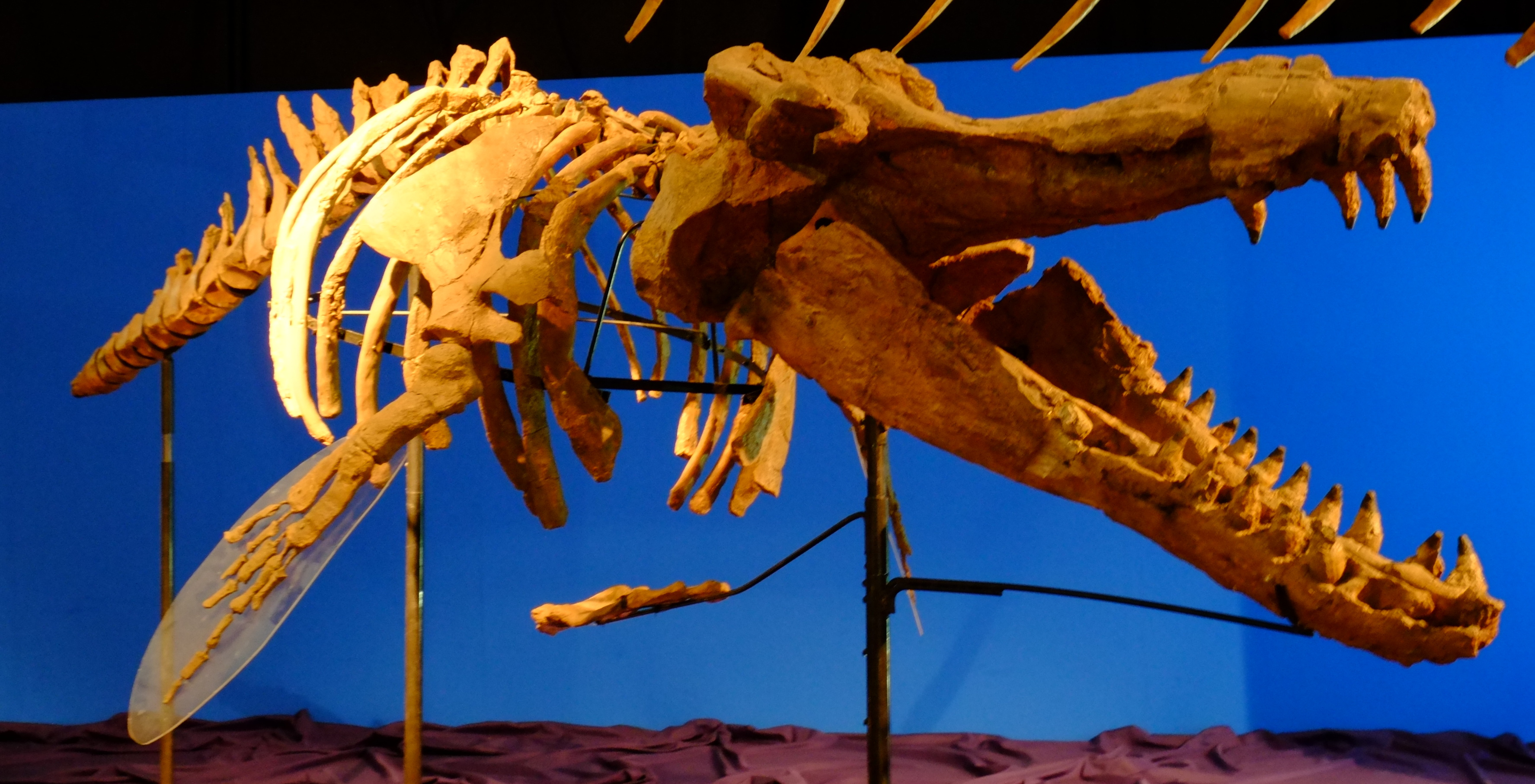
Brygmophyseter skeleton

The macroraptorial sperm whales are a paraphyletic fossil group of hyper-predatory stem sperm whales. All share large, functional, enamel-coated teeth on both the upper and lower jaws, which were used in capturing large prey. In contrast, the modern sperm whale (Physeter macrocephalus) lacks enamel, teeth in the upper jaw, and the ability to use its teeth to catch prey. However, Livyatan belongs to a different lineage than the other macroraptorials, and the development of large size and the spermaceti organ, an organ that is characteristic of sperm whales, are thought to have evolved independently from the other macroraptorials. The large teeth either evolved once in the group with a basilosaurid-like common ancestor, or independently in Livyatan. The large temporal fossa depressions on the skull of raptorials is probably descended from a common ancestor (plesiomorphy). The presence of enamel is thought to be an ancient and basal characteristic, as it is present on the teeth of fetal modern sperm whales. Macroraptorials appeared during an adaptive radiation event of baleen whales in the Miocene, an increase in whale populations and diversity, implying the macroraptorials evolved specifically to exploit baleen whales. A 30 cm (12 in) tooth found in Australia indicates macroraptorials still existed 5 mya in the Pliocene.

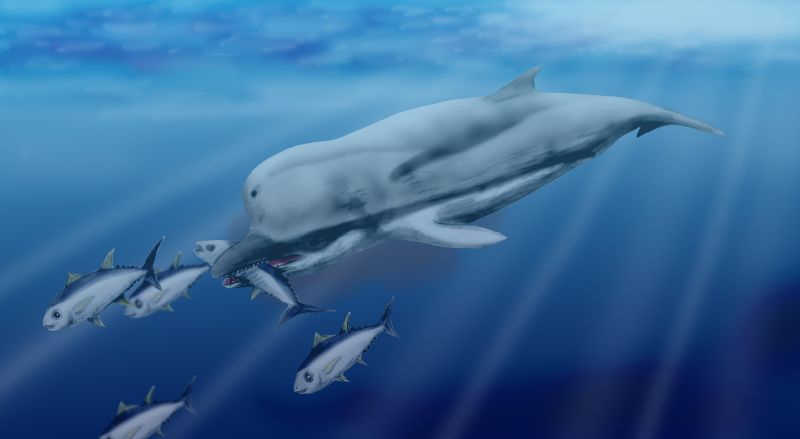
Restoration of Zygophyseter

It has also been suggested that the macroraptorials be placed into the subfamily Hoplocetinae, a subfamily characterized by robust and enamel-coated teeth, alongside the genera Diaphorocetus, Idiorophus, and Hoplocetus, which are known from the Miocene to the Early Pleistocene. However, most of these whales are known from fragmentary remains or have been used as wastebasket taxa for indiscernible stem sperm whale remains.

- Physeteroidea
  - †Eudelphis
  - - - †**Zygophyseter**
      - †**Brygmophyseter**
    - †**Acrophyseter**
  - - †**Livyatan**
    - †**Albicetus**
    - - † **Scaldicetus**
      - - Physeteridae
          - - †Orycterocetus
            - - †Idiorophus
              - †Physeterula
          - - - - †Idiophyseter
                - - Physeter
                  - †Aulophyseter
              - †Placoziphius
            - †Diaphorocetus
        - Kogiidae
          - - †Aprixokogia
            - - - Kogia
                - †Praekogia
              - †Scaphokogia
          - †Thalassocetus

Macroraptorials are in bold

== See also ==
- Scaldicetus
