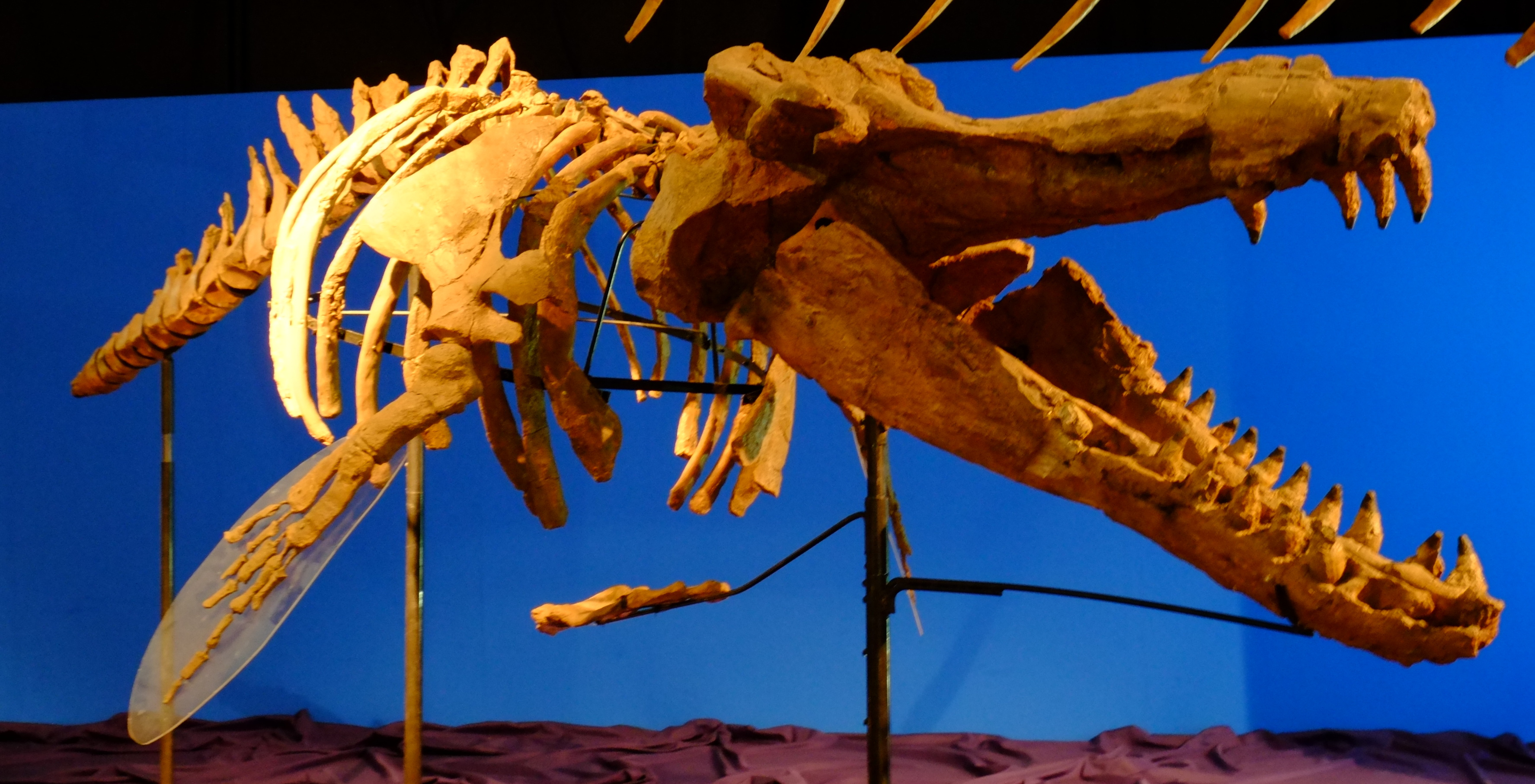
- Restored skeleton

Scientific classification
- Kingdom: Animalia
- Phylum: Chordata
- Class: Mammalia
- Order: Artiodactyla
- Infraorder: Cetacea
- Superfamily: Physeteroidea
- Genus: †Brygmophyseter; Barnes, 2006
- Species: †B. shigensis

Binomial name
- †Brygmophyseter shigensis (Hirota and Barnes, 1994)

Synonyms
- Scaldicetus shigensis; Naganocetus shigensis

= Brygmophyseter =

Brygmophyseter Temporal range: Miocene (Langhian), 16–14 Ma

Extinct genus of toothed whale

Brygmophyseter, known as the biting sperm whale, is an extinct genus of toothed whale in the sperm whale family with one species, B. shigensis. When it was first described in 1994, the species was placed in the genus Scaldicetus based on tooth morphology, but this was later revised in 2006. A month later since the naming of Brygmophyseter, another study classified this species into the genus Naganocetus, which is considered to be a junior synonym. The only known specimen, a nearly complete skeleton, was dated to be around 16–14 million years old (middle Miocene). The Brygmophyseter holotype is estimated to have been 6 to 7 meters (20 to 23 ft) long by different researchers, and it probably had 11 or 12 large teeth covered with thick enamel in the upper and lower jaws. The tooth roots were firmly embedded in the gums, making it easy to catch resistance-fighting prey. Brygmophyseter is part of a group of macroraptorial sperm whales (often shortened to "raptorial") which tended to be apex predators using their large teeth to catch large prey such as whales. It had a spermaceti organ which was probably used for biosonar like in the modern sperm whale. The whale has made an appearance on The History Channel's TV series Jurassic Fight Club.

== History of discovery ==
The holotype specimen, SFM-0001, was excavated from the Bessho Formation in the Nagano Prefecture in Japan in 1988 by the residents of Shiga-mura with assistance from the staff of the Shiga Fossil Museum. The specimen is nearly complete, and consists of a partial skull, the jawbone, the lingual bone in the neck, vertebrae, ribs, the breastbone, and humeri and radii in the limbs. It was dated to the Langhian stage of the Miocene 14–15 million years ago (mya), and the specimen is currently on display at the Gunma Museum of Natural History in Japan.

The genus name is a combination of the Ancient Greek word brygmos, which means "biting" or "gnashing", combined with physeter, which is the generic name of the living sperm whale, and also means "blower" in Ancient Greek. The junior synonym Naganocetus derives from the Nagano Prefecture and the Latin cetus meaning "whale".

== Description ==
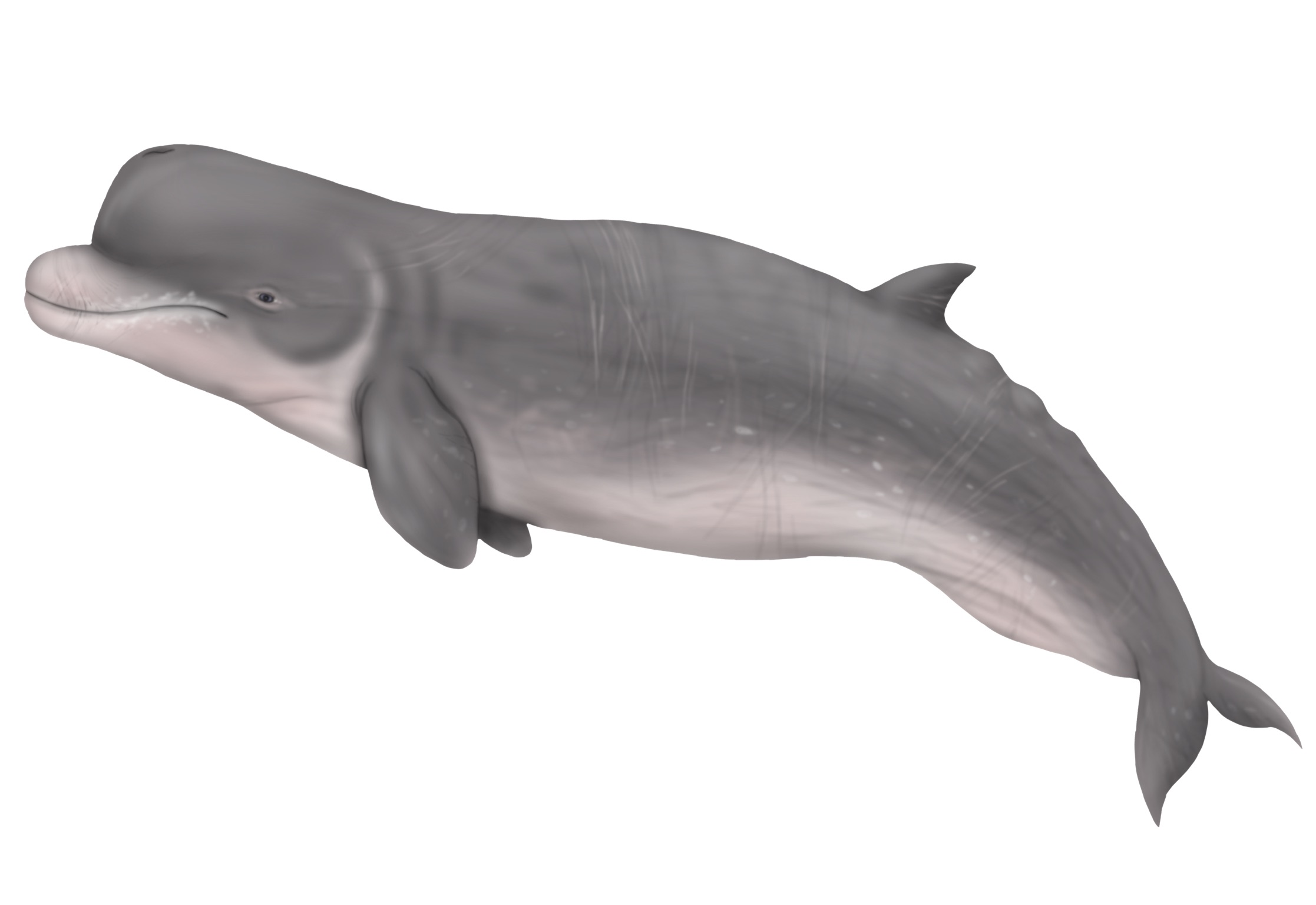
Life restoration

Like other raptorials, Brygmophyseter had enamel-coated teeth in both jaws, unlike the modern sperm whale (Physeter macrocephalus). It probably had about 11 or 12 teeth in each jaw, though no upper teeth were preserved in the holotype; two indeterminate physeteroid specimens (GMNHPV-581 and INM-4-012885) with teeth length of approximately 14 and 16 centimeters (5.5 and 6.3 in) respectively were assigned to as aff. B. shigensis in 2024, meaning that the specimens have affinity to but do not definitively represent Brygmophyseter. The tooth roots were firmly embedded in the gums, making it easy to catch resistance-fighting prey. The skull of the holotype measured around 1.5 meters (4.9 ft), and it had an elongated snout. The brow ridge was broad and flat-topped, and the zygomatic process of the squamosal bone on the cheeks was large and robust. The temporal fossa on the sides of the skull were elongated, which may have been plesiomorphic features from archaeocetes, that is, it is an ancestral characteristic of the whale. The right nasal passage was small and was asymmetrical with the left nasal passage, like in the modern sperm whale. Characteristic of sperm whales, it had a deep basin on the top of its skull, known as the supracranial basin. Like in the modern sperm whale, this basin probably held the spermaceti organ, and so the whale had biosonar capabilities. This encompassed the entire breadth of the snout in Livyatan and Brygmophyseter.. The nuchal crest which is the part of the whale skull which projects upwards on the back end of the skull, behind the supracranial basin, was low and broad. Similar to modern-day toothed whales, but unlike in the modern sperm whale, the shoulder blades were thicker than they were tall.

Brygmophyseter compared to a diver

Brygmophyseter is estimated to have been 6 to 7 meters (20 to 23 ft) long by different researchers. This size was similar to Zygophyseter varolai and larger than Acrophyseter sp. It preserves ten thoracic vertebrae, ten lumbar vertebrae, and fifteen caudal vertebrae. In comparison, the modern sperm whale has eleven thoracic, eight lumbar, and twenty-two caudal vertebrae, and the smaller tail in Brygmophyseter is probably a primitive characteristic. The vertebra segments increase in height until the seventh lumbar vertebra, then they begin to decrease. In the thoracic vertebrae, with the exception of the tenth one, the width of the segments is larger than the height. The lumbar and caudal vertebrae are circular in shape. The head probably took up 21–25% of the total body size, compared to that of the modern sperm whale which takes up around one fourth to one third of the total body size. The length from the spine to the lumbar spine, excluding the skull, was approximately 4.5–5.5 meters (15–18 ft).

The head of the humerus arm bone of Brygmophyseter was positioned perpendicular to the shaft. The elbow joint on the humerus was not distinct from the ulna, typical in cetaceans. The ulna was more primitive than that of the modern sperm whale, in that the shaft was longer and more slender, and the head of the bone was smaller.

== Taxonomy ==
=== Phylogeny ===
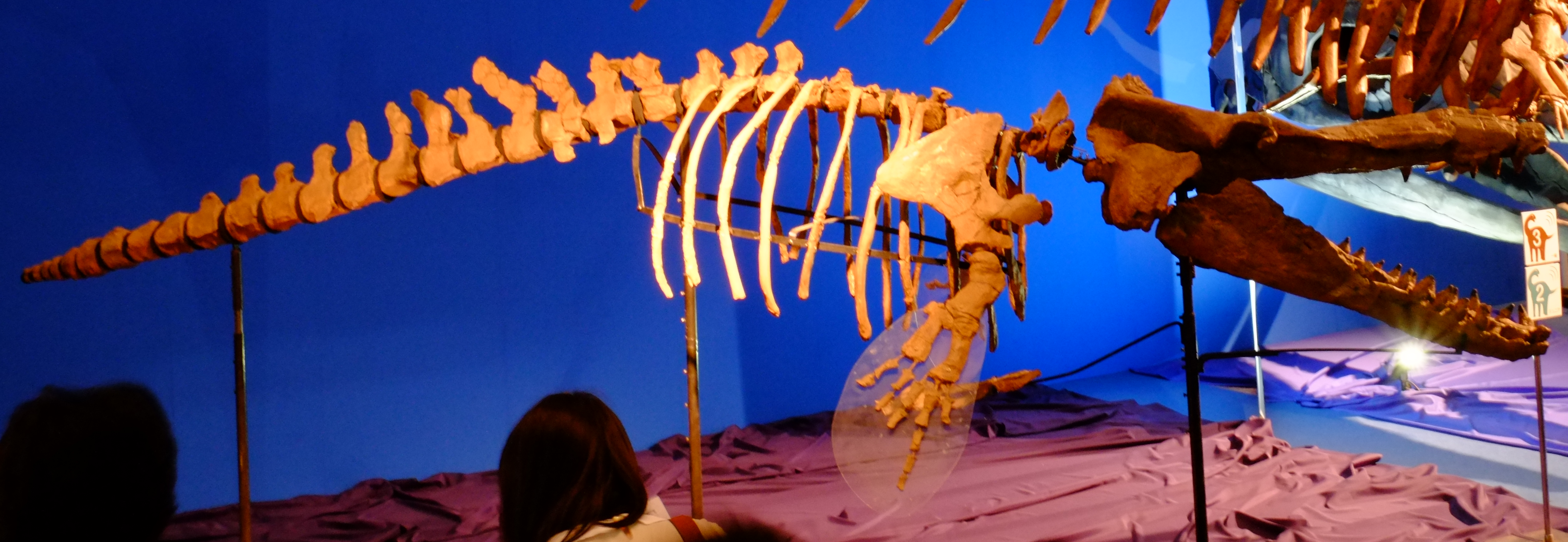
Reconstructed skeleton in side view

Brygmophyseter is a member of a fossil stem group of hyper-predatory macroraptorial sperm whales from the Miocene (often shortened to "raptorial"). The other members are Acrophyseter, Albicetus, Livyatan, and Zygophyseter, and these five whales have in common enamel-coated teeth in both the upper and lower jaws which were used in hunting large prey. These teeth are thought to have evolved in either a basilosaurid-like common ancestor, or multiple times independently in the group. Brygmophyseter is the oldest raptorial. It has been proposed that these raptorials be placed into the extinct paraphyletic (hence, probably invalid) subfamily Hoplocetinae, alongside Scaldicetus, Diaphorocetus, Idiorophus, and Hoplocetus.

The species was first described in 1994 by paleontologists Kiyoharu Hirota and Lawrence Barnes. Observing the teeth which were present in both jaws and coated in enamel, they had placed it into the genus Scaldicetus which was described in 1867 as having similar characteristics. However, a 2006 study authored by paleontologists Toshiyuki Kimura, Yoshikazu Hasegawa and Lawrence Barnes stated that since Scaldicetus is described only from tooth remains and is likely a wastebasket taxon, this new species should not be assigned to the genus. Therefore, they placed it into the newly erected genus Brygmophyseter, with the authorship solely credited to Barnes. A study published in the same year by geologists Giovanni Bianucci and Walter Landini placed the whale into the genus Naganocetus which they had created, and concluded that it was most closely related to Zygophyseter, which they had for the first time described in the same study. This was justified by their similar body sizes, the basin containing the spermaceti organ (the supracranial basin) not extending forward (causing a convex snout), and the presence of long temporal fossae on the sides of the skull. However, since the study naming Brygmophyseter was officially published a month earlier, Naganocetus is considered to be a junior synonym, in spite of the manuscript for Bianucci and Landini (2006) being submitted earlier.

- Physeteroidea
  - Eudelphis
  - - - †**Zygophyseter**
      - †**Brygmophyseter**
    - †**Acrophyseter**
  - - †**Livyatan**
    - - †Aulophyseter?
      - - Physeteridae
          - - †Orycterocetus
            - - †Idiorophus
              - †Physeterula
          - - - - †Idiophyseter
                - - Physeter
                  - †Aulophyseter
              - †Placoziphius
            - †Diaphorocetus
        - Kogiidae
          - - †Aprixokogia
            - - - Kogia
                - †Praekogia
              - †Scaphokogia
          - †Thalassocetus

Relationships between Brygmophyseter and other sperm whales, raptorials in bold

== Paleobiology ==
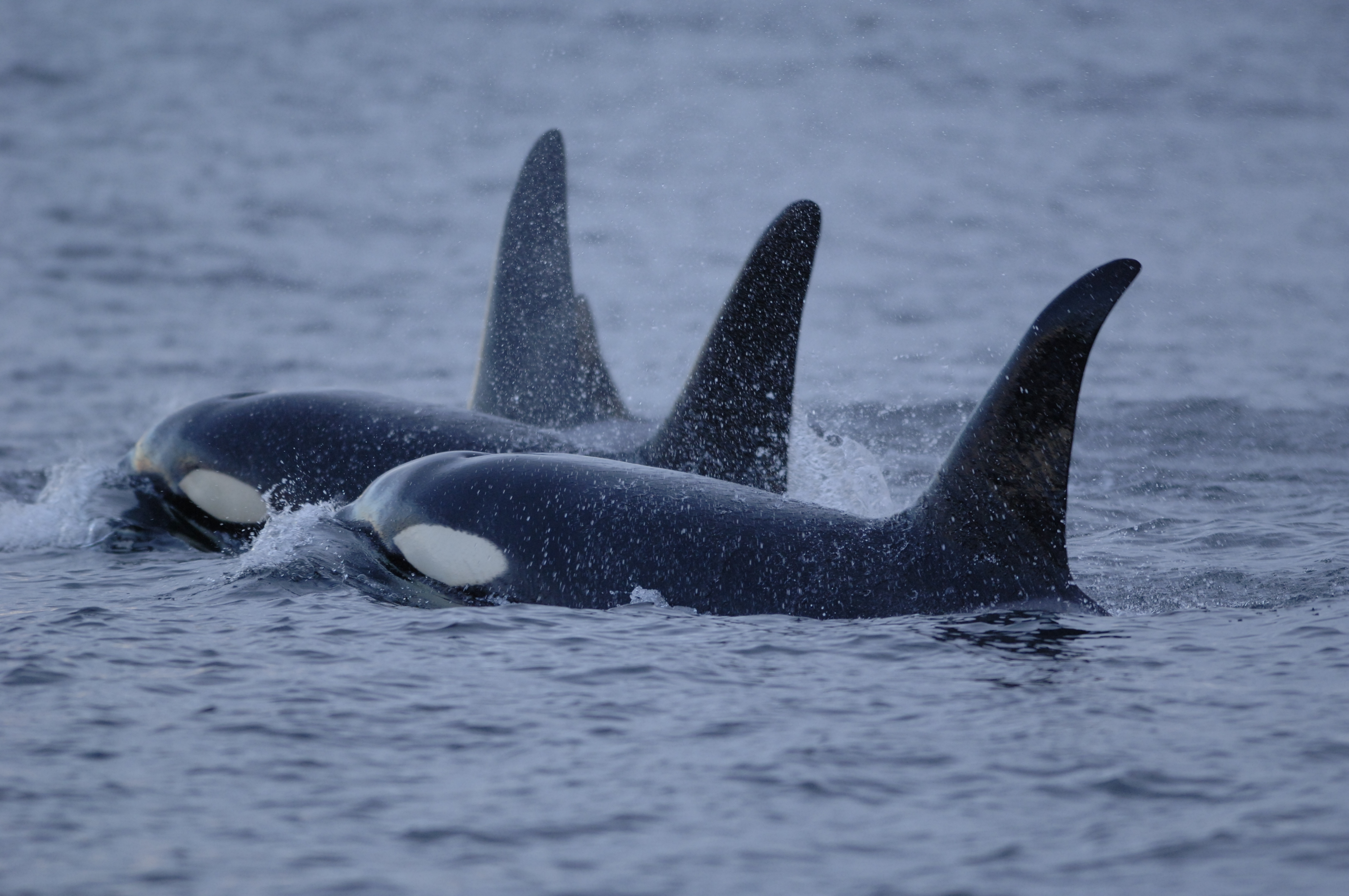
Raptorial sperm whales like Brygmophyseter occupied a niche similar to the modern-day killer whale (Orcinus orca).

Brygmophyseter occupied the role of an apex predator in the Miocene marine ecosystem, preying primarily on large marine vertebrates such as cetaceans, seals, fish, and possibly squid, shark as inferred from its robust dental morphology and body size 6–7 meters (20–23 ft) comparable to large killer whales. Tooth wear patterns, including deep occlusal facets on the thick enamel-coated teeth, indicate frequent tooth-to-tooth contact during the processing of tough, fleshy prey, supporting a hypercarnivorous diet focused on tearing and shearing large animals rather than small or soft-bodied organisms. These inferences are based primarily on the holotype, a nearly complete skeleton.

Occupying the top of the Miocene marine food web, Brygmophyseter competed with other Macroraptorial sperm whales like Albicetus, and with giant sharks like Otodus megalodon, for resources, occupying a trophic level analogous to modern orcas and preying on high-calorie marine mammals to meet its estimated daily energy demands of thousands of kilocalories, sustained through ambush or pursuit strategies in coastal to pelagic habitats. Fossil evidence, including buccal maxillary exostoses acting as buttresses for intense occlusal stresses and associated dental fractures, further corroborates this macropredatory lifestyle without direct stomach contents or bite marks on prey remains.

== Paleoecology ==
Since Brygmophyseter was a raptorial, and the group is characterized by their adaptations for subduing large prey, Brygmophyseter was likely a macropredator of marine mammals and other large marine vertebrates, occupying a niche similar to the killer whale. Though no stomach remains or bite marks have been found, it is thought to have preyed upon a variety of animals, including whales, seals, fish, and cephalopods.

Brygmophyseter was discovered in the Middle Miocene deposits of the Bessho Formation of Japan, which has also yielded some of the earliest oceanic dolphins and rorqual baleen whales, as well as beaked whale remains. The formation also had fossil bivalves which indicate the presence of deep-sea hydrothermal vents, and there is also evidence of prehistoric cold vents in the area, which today host chemosynthetic specialist species; the formation was likely 1,000–2,000 meters (3,300–6,600 ft) deep in the Miocene. Also found were fossil plants, echinoderms, cephalopods, deep-sea teleost fish, and seabirds. The shark remains discovered in this formation belong to the sandbar shark (Carcharhinus plumbeus) and other unidentified Carcharhinus sharks, the seal shark (Dalatias licha), the extinct broad-toothed mako (Cosmopolitodus hastalis), the extinct hook-tooth mako (Isurus planus), the Japanese velvet dogfish (Scymnodon ichiharai), and a species of Etmopterus lantern shark.

== In fiction ==
Brygmophyseter was featured in the fifth episode of The History Channel's Jurassic Fight Club, "Deep Sea Killers". In this episode, Brygmophyseter, which was referred to as the "biting sperm whale", was portrayed as being able to weaponize sonar in order to stun prey, and to have traveled in pods like the modern-day killer whale. The pod was attacked by a megalodon, which seemingly had a similar size About 15 meters (49 ft). When the megalodon severely wounded one of the members of the pod, the rest of the whales teamed up to drive the megalodon off. Once the member of the pod died, however, the megalodon returned to feed on it. Brygmophyseter is exaggerated in size to 10.7–12.2 meters (35–40 ft)

== See also ==
- Evolution of cetaceans
- List of extinct cetaceans
