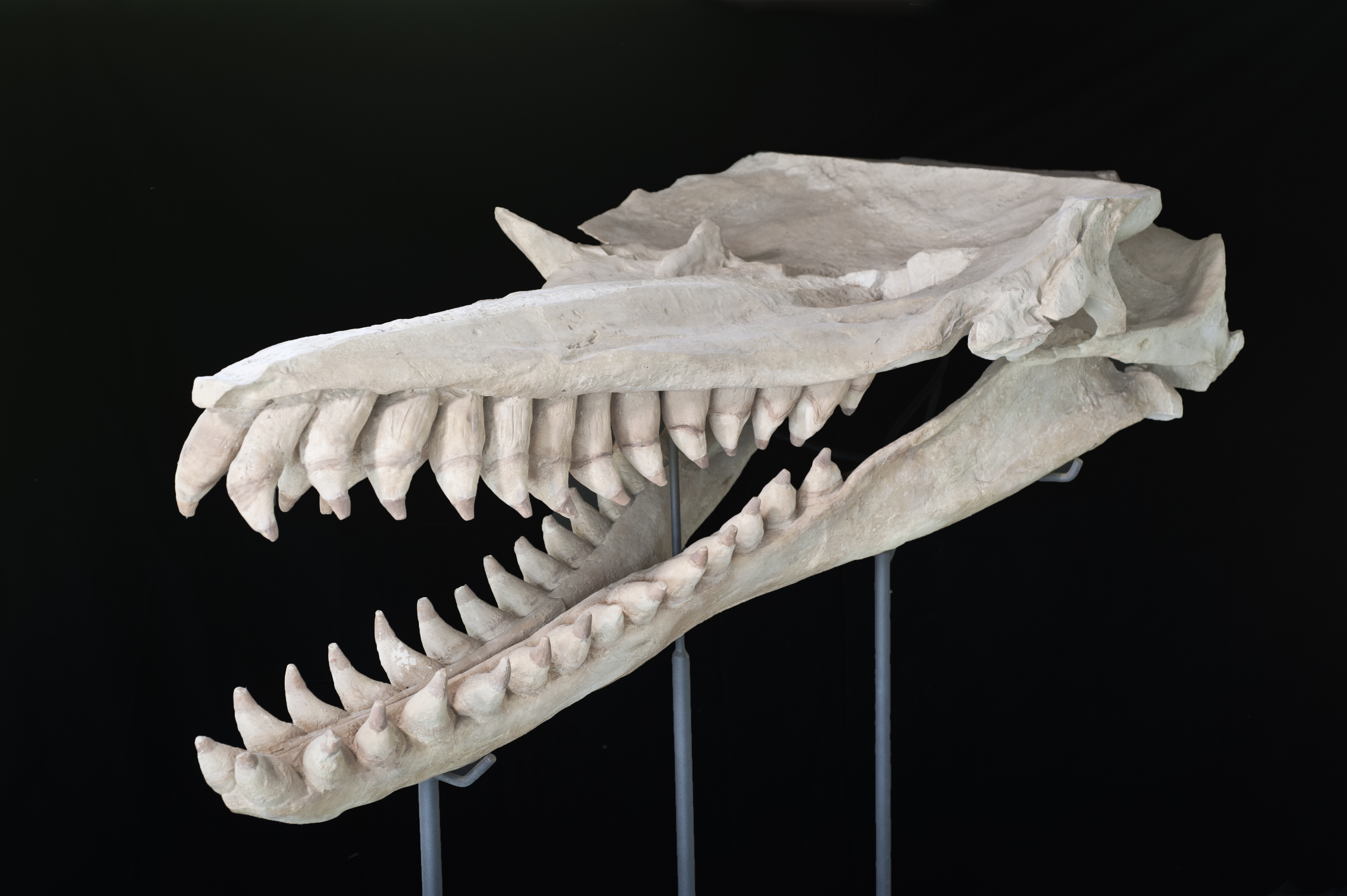
- Cast of the skull at the Natural History Museum of the University of Pisa in Italy

Scientific classification
- Kingdom: Animalia
- Phylum: Chordata
- Class: Mammalia
- Infraclass: Placentalia
- Order: Artiodactyla
- Infraorder: Cetacea
- Superfamily: Physeteroidea
- Family: †Incertae sedis
- Genus: †Zygophyseter; Bianucci & Landini, 2006
- Species: †Z. varolai

Binomial name
- †Zygophyseter varolai Bianucci & Landini, 2006

= Zygophyseter =

Zygophyseter Temporal range: Miocene (Tortonian), 11.6–7.2 Ma

Extinct genus of sperm whales

Zygophyseter is an extinct genus of sperm whale that lived during the Tortonian age of the Late Miocene 11.2 to 7.6 million years ago. The genus contains a single species, Zygophyseter varolai, known from a single specimen from the Pietra Leccese Formation in Italy. It was a member of a stem group of fossil macroraptorial sperm whales (often shortened to "raptorial") also including Brygmophyseter, Acrophyseter, and Livyatan. It probably grew to be around 6.5 to 7 meters (21 to 23 ft) in length and shared some characteristics with other raptorials, such as large teeth with tooth enamel that were functional in both the upper and lower jaws which the modern sperm whale (Physeter macrocephalus) lacks. It also had a beak, the ability to echolocate prey, and could have probably swum faster than the modern-day sperm whale which can reach 40 kilometers per hour (25 mph). These were probably used in the capture of large prey, such as large fish, seals, and whales. In fact, its common name, the killer sperm whale, refers to its feeding habits that would have had a resemblance to the modern-day killer whale (Orcinus orca).

== Discovery and naming ==
The type and only specimen, labelled MAUL 229/1, is of an almost complete skeleton discovered in southern Italy by geologist Angelo Varola in the marine lime mudstone of the Pietra Leccese Formation near the city of Lecce. It was described in 2006 by geologists Giovanni Bianucci and Walter Landini from the University of Pisa. The genus name Zygophyseter comes from the Latin word zygomaticus, which emphasizes the elongation of the zygomatic process of the only known species Z. varolai, and the term physeter refers to the modern-day sperm whale (Physeter macrocephalus) of the family Physeteridae. The species name honors the discoverer.

== Description ==
=== Skull ===
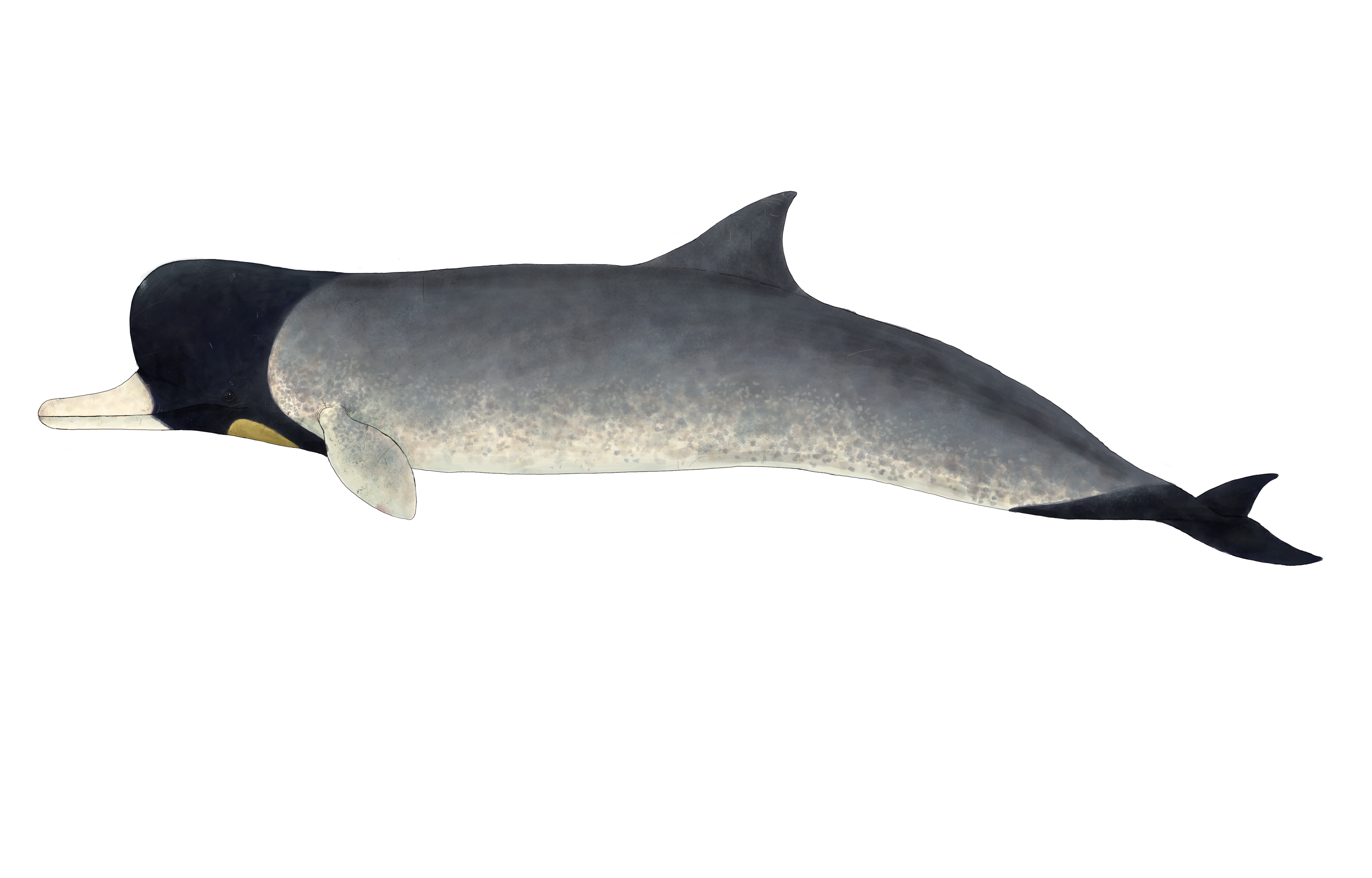
Digital reconstruction showing the proposed beak

A characteristic of related raptorials, Zygophyseter had buccal exostoses, bony outgrowths in the alveolar ridge in the mouth, which are thought to have increased their bite force. Like other raptorials, it had large temporal fossae, probably for supporting strong temporal and masseter muscles, the strongest muscles between the skull and the jaw, meaning this adaptation allowed it to shut its jaws harder. The zygomatic bone (cheekbone) projects outward (anteriorly), indicating it had a beak, which featured an abrupt narrowing; this may have allowed it to clamp down on prey more effectively.

The head probably took up 21–23% of the total body size, compared to that of the modern sperm whale which takes up around one fourth to one third of the total body size. Like in other sperm whales, the blowhole was slanted towards the left side of the animal, and it may have lacked a right nasal passage. The falciform process on the squamosal bone was large and ventrally facing; as opposed to the ones in the Kogiidae (Kogia and Praekogia) which are either reduced or absent. These may have been reduced in kogiids due to adaptations to deep-sea diving.

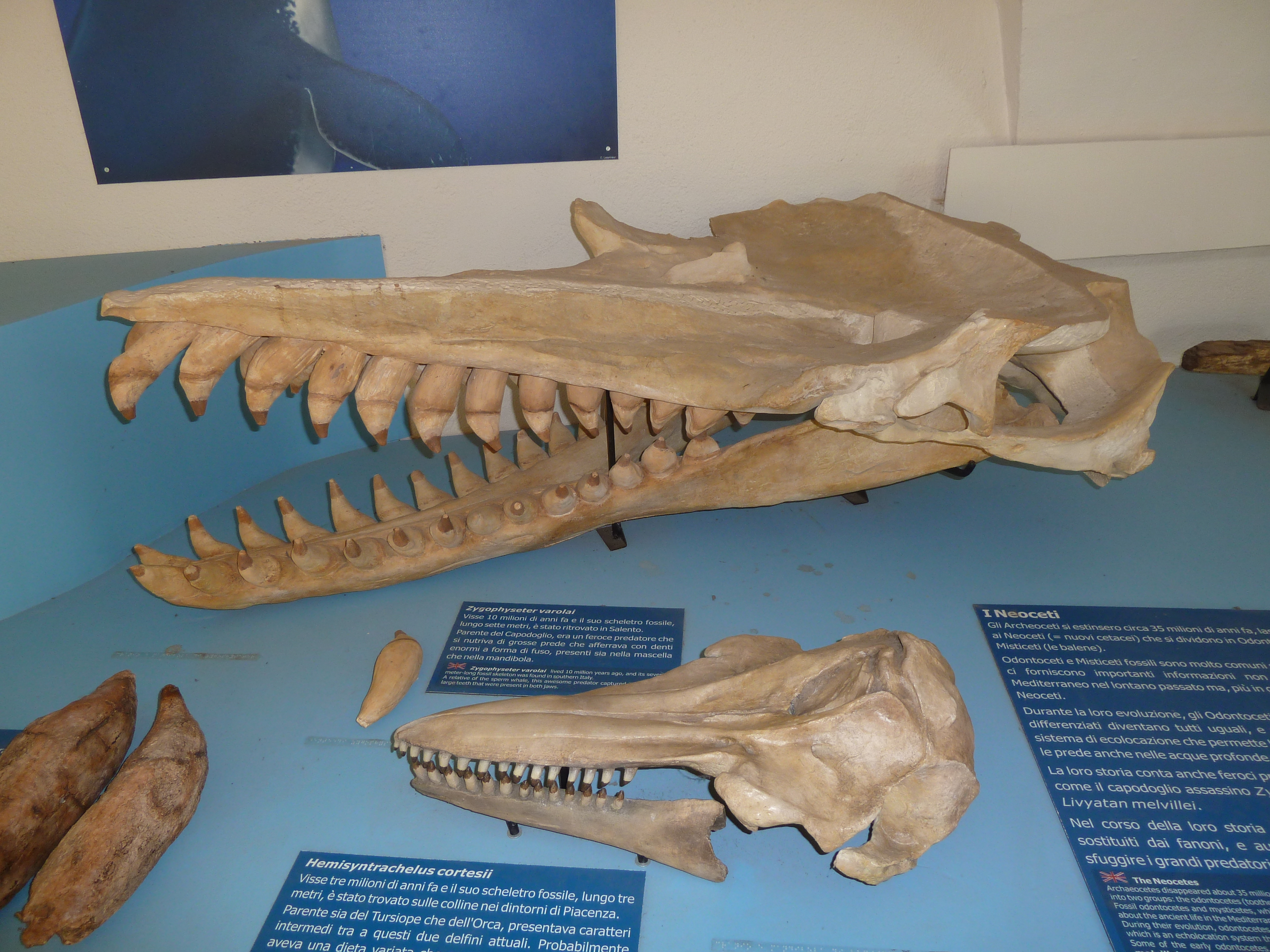
Zygophyseter skull (back) next to that of Hemisyntrachelus (front)

Like in modern sperm whales, Zygophyseter had a very large basin above the braincase, known as the supracranial basin, which probably housed the spermaceti organ and the melon. These are used in the generation and focusing of sound for biosonar in the modern sperm whale, indicating Zygophyseter had some mechanisms for biosonar; that is to say this animal could have used echolocation. The zygomatic processes of the temporal bone on the cheeks were elongated probably because they supported the spermaceti organ. The skull features a pronounced slope into the supracranial basin. It probably had an echolocation system similar to that of the modern sperm whale, and Zygophyseter may have, in comparison to the echolocative abilities of other modern toothed whales, produced smaller bandwidths and lower center frequencies. This would have made it inept at detecting anything that did not have a diameter of at least 1 meter (3 ft 3 in).

=== Teeth ===
Zygophyseter had 28 teeth in the lower jaws and 26 in the upper jaws. The curvature of the teeth increased medially, that is, the teeth in the front of the mouth were straighter than the teeth in the back of the mouth. The back teeth featured more wear than the front teeth. Like Brygmophyseter, it had a relatively small crown, making up only 18% of the tooth. Killer whales (Orcinus orca), in comparison, have crowns that make up 20–25% of the tooth. Other characteristics include the presence of the gumline below the crown-root boundary (meaning that part of the root was exposed), and longitudinal grooves on the root. In the type specimen, the teeth ranged in height from 150 to 250 millimeters (5.9 to 9.8 in) with an average height of 175.6 mm (6.91 in), and ranged in diameter from 47 to 56 mm (1.9 to 2.2 in) with an average of 52.4 mm (2.06 in). Like in other raptorials, and unlike in the modern sperm whale, Zygophyseter had tooth enamel. Like in Acrophyseter, the mandibular foramen takes up about 40% of the lower jawbone. The teeth of the upper jaw form an angle of nearly 120 degrees between the crown and the root, which is possibly a characteristic shared by all raptorials.

=== Vertebrae ===
Size comparison

Zygophyseter could reach an estimated length of 6.5 to 7 meters (21 to 23 ft), compared to the 12.5-to-18.5-meter (41 to 61 ft) modern sperm whale. It is thought that this whale had twelve thoracic vertebrae and at least ten lumbar vertebrae. The type specimen had only 8 thoracic vertebrae preserved, and only the atlas of the neck vertebrae. Like in the modern sperm whales, the neck vertebrae may have been fused. The centrum of the thoracic vertebrae formed a large and almost pear-shaped central canal which transports nutrients to the spinal cord. The width between the transverse processes (the diagonal projections from a vertebral centrum) of the thoracic vertebrae were 235 millimeters (9.3 in); and the neural spine, the part of the spine that projects away from the centrum, is missing in the type specimen, but it was probably short and thin. The lumbar vertebrae were elongated and may have supported large multifidus and longissimus muscles in the back, likely larger than the modern sperm whale, and so it probably swam faster than the modern sperm whale; the modern sperm whale typically travels horizontally at 4 kilometers per hour (2.5 mph), comparable to other large open-ocean animals. The type specimen had eight caudal vertebrae in the tail.

The animal probably had 12 ribs. The length of the ribs increased from the first to the fifth, then decreased from the fifth to the twelfth; and the width of the ribs decreased from the first to the twelfth, similar to other cetaceans.

== Classification ==
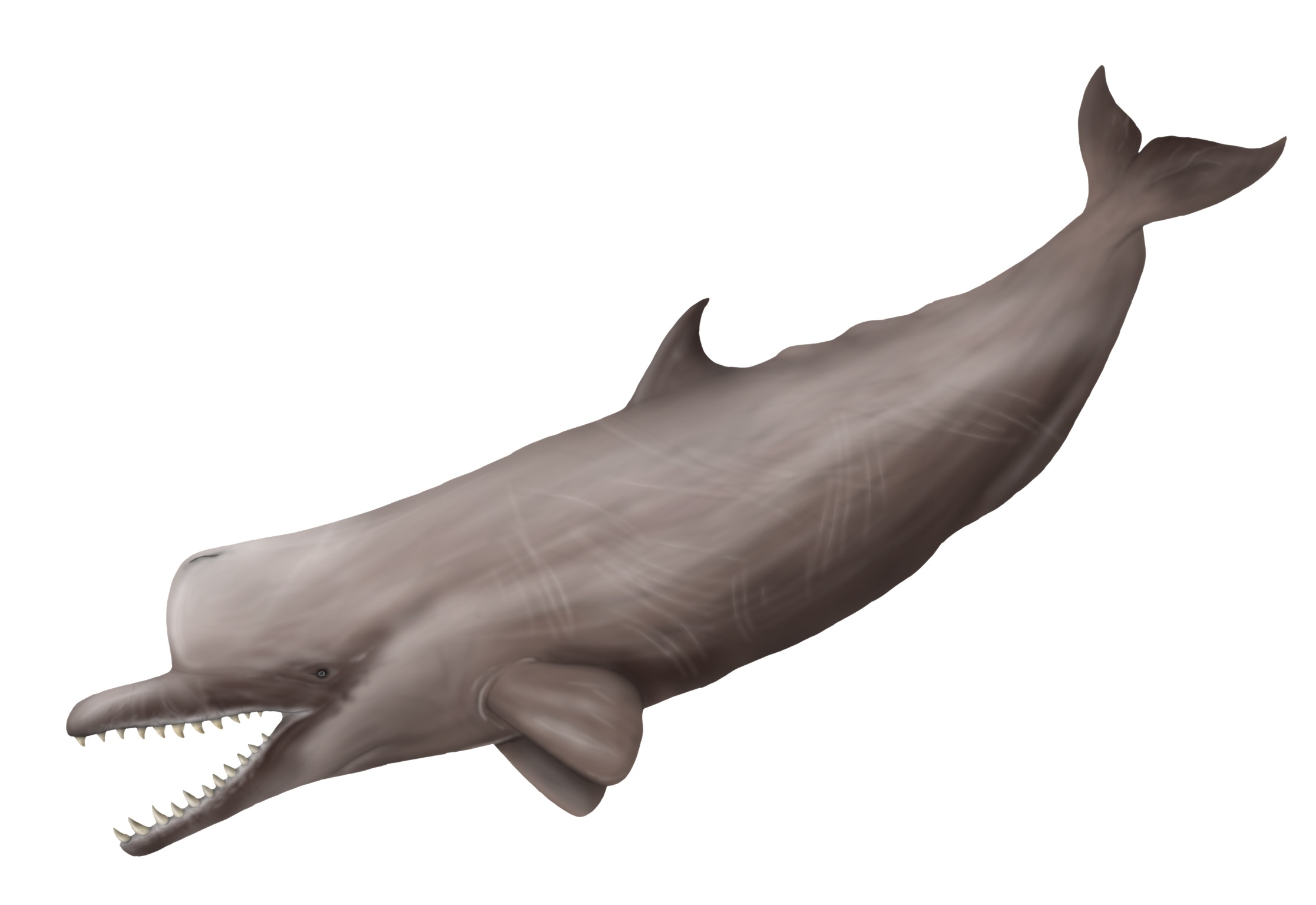
Life reconstruction

Zygophyseter is part of a fossil stem group of hyper-predatory macroraptorial sperm whales (often shortened to "raptorial") which also includes Brygmophyseter, Acrophyseter, and Livyatan. This group is characterized by having large, functional teeth on both the upper and lower jaw with an enamel coating; whereas the modern sperm whale lacks enamel, teeth in the upper jaws, and functionality in the teeth for catching prey. Zygophyseter is more closely related to Brygmophyseter and Acrophyseter than to Livyatan, and the enlarged teeth of this group are thought to have evolved either from a common basilosaurid-like ancestor, or independently once or twice within the group.

Some fossil remains, mostly teeth, of the genus Scaldicetus were reassigned to these raptorials, including Z. varolai. Scaldicetus is now considered to be a grade taxon with reported specimens probably united only by similar physical characteristics rather than a shared ancestry as a clade. It has been proposed that these raptorials be placed into the extinct, possibly paraphyletic (which would make it invalid) subfamily Hoplocetinae, alongside Scaldicetus, Diaphorocetus, Idiorophus, and Hoplocetus.

Phylogenetical analysis shows that Zygophyseter is most closely related to Brygmophyseter. The cladogram below show the relationship of Zygophyseter with other sperm whales, the raptorials in bold:

- Physeteroidea
  - †Eudelphis
  - - - **†Zygophyseter**
      - **†Brygmophyseter**
    - **†Acrophyseter**
  - - **†Livyatan**
    - - †'Aulophyseter' rionegrensis
      - - Physeteridae
          - - †Orycterocetus
            - - †Idiorophus
              - †Physeterula
          - - - - †Idiophyseter
                - - Physeter
                  - †Aulophyseter
              - †Placoziphius
            - †Diaphorocetus
        - Kogiidae
          - - †Aprixokogia
            - - - Kogia
                - †Praekogia
              - †Scaphokogia
          - †Thalassocetus

== Paleobiology ==
=== Feeding and bite force ===
Since the teeth of Zygophyseter are large, exhibit wearing not unlike the teeth of modern-day killer whales, and had functionality in both the upper and lower jaws, it was likely a macropredator. The position of the condyloid processes between the jaw and the skull, like in the modern sperm whale, allowed it to open its jaw wider in order to grab large prey. Its apparent similarity to the feeding habits of the killer whale gave it its nickname "killer sperm whale."

A 2021 multi-author study led by Emanuele Peri reconstructed the bite force of Zygophyseter using finite element analysis of the skull. The model calculated an anterior bite force (the bite force at the front end of the jaws) of 4,812 newtons (1,082 pounds-force) and posterior bite force (at the back end of the jaws) of 10,823 N (2,433 lb_{f}) from a bite simulated at a 35-degree jaw gape. This is roughly the same bite force that could be exerted by an adult great white shark that is 5.01–5.36 meters (16.4–17.6 ft) long and is stronger than that in other strong-biting animals like lions, though not as strong as in saltwater crocodiles and Basilosaurus isis. Nevertheless, the posterior bite force of Zygophyseter was strong enough to crush bone.

The significant disparity between the anterior and posterior bite forces and the pattern of stress distribution in the finite element analysis model suggests that Zygophyseter employed a "grip-and-shear" feeding strategy, in which the animal would grasp prey with its front teeth and cut them using its back teeth. This strategy is somewhat unique, being absent in modern marine macropredators such as sharks and orcas, which instead use a "grip-and-tear" method that dismembers prey by holding and shaking them, and was only previously present in some basilosaurids. However, it is likely that the feeding strategy evolved independently in Zygophyseter and related macroraptorial sperm whales, as it was absent in more ancestral genera like Eudelphis. Given the similar bite force between Zygophyseter and a fully grown great white shark, it was hypothesized that the cetacean occupied a similar ecological niche that primarily fed on local large fish such as marlin and wahoos and small to medium-sized marine mammals such as seals, dugongs, and small cetaceans. However, neither stomach contents nor cut marks on the bones of prey species have been discovered, and thus its diet is speculative.

== Paleoecology ==
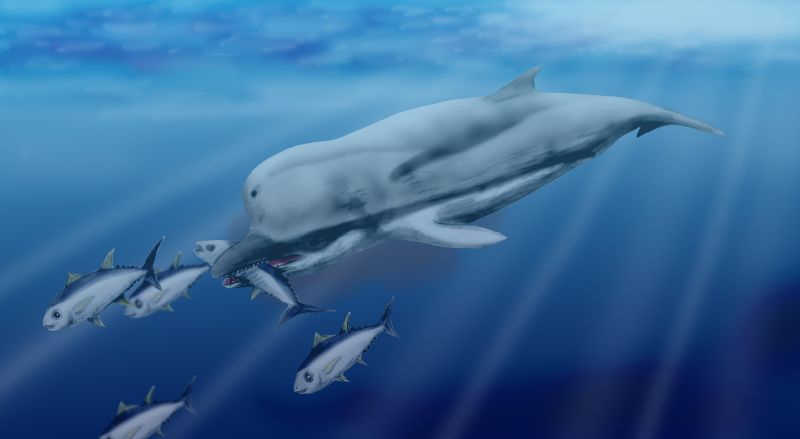
Restoration of Zygophyseter hunting tuna

The Z. varolai specimen from the Pietra Leccese Formation dates back to the Tortonian age of the Late Miocene epoch, around 11.6 to 7.2 million years ago (mya), and most likely inhabited the Paratethys sea. This formation has also unearthed the remains of several other large vertebrate species. Ancient sirenians of the genus Metaxytherium were apparently common throughout the ancient Mediterranean Sea. Many fish remains of teleost fish, rays, and at least twenty species of sharks have been discovered, such as the tiger shark (Galeocerdo cuvier) and the extinct Otodus megalodon. Three species of turtles have been identified: Trachyaspis lardyi, Procolpochelys melii, which are both ancient marine turtles, and Psephophorus polygonus, an ancient leatherback sea turtle. Aside from Zygophyseter, two other cetacean species have been described from this formation: the oldest-known gray whale Archaeschrichtius ruggieroi, and a species of beaked whale Messapicetus longirostris.

== See also ==
- Aulophyseter
- Orycterocetus
