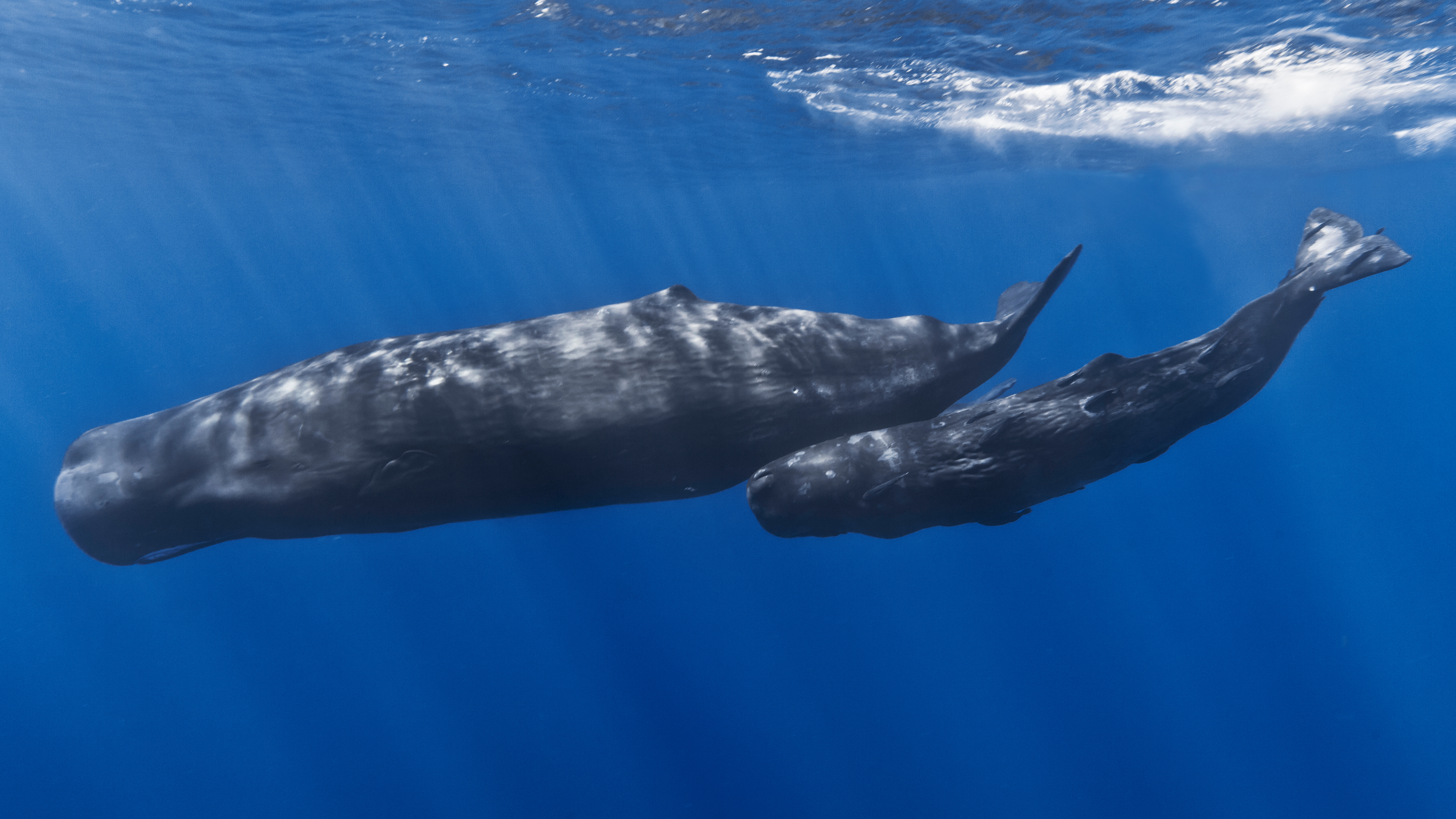
- Sperm whale (Physeter macrocephalus)

Scientific classification
- Kingdom: Animalia
- Phylum: Chordata
- Class: Mammalia
- Order: Artiodactyla
- Infraorder: Cetacea
- Family: Physeteridae
- Subfamily: Physeterinae; Gray, 1821

= Physeterinae =

Physeterinae Temporal range: Late Miocene–Holocene

Subfamily of whales

Physeterinae is a subfamily of whales in the family Physeteridae. It contains one extant genus, Physeter (sperm whales), and nine extinct genera (five of which are considered nomen dubium).

== Genera ==
- †Aulophyseter Godfrey and Lambert, 2023
- †Idiophyseter R. Kellogg, 1925
- †Orycterocetus Leidy, 1853
- Physeter Linnaeus, 1758
- †Physeterula Van Beneden, 1877
- †Placoziphius van Beneden, 1869

=== Nomina dubia ===
- †Balaenodon Owen, 1846
- †Physetodon McCoy, 1879
- †Priscophyseter Portis, 1886
- †Prophyseter Abel, 1905
- †Thalassocetus Abel, 1905
