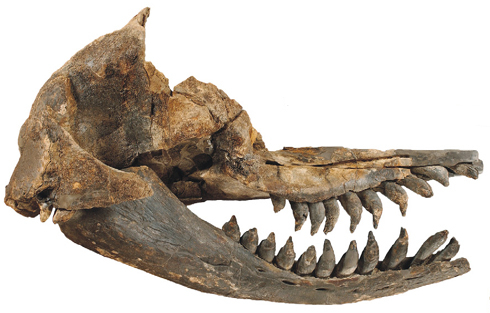
- Holotype skull of A. deinodon

Scientific classification
- Kingdom: Animalia
- Phylum: Chordata
- Class: Mammalia
- Order: Artiodactyla
- Infraorder: Cetacea
- Superfamily: Physeteroidea
- Family: †Incertae sedis
- Genus: †Acrophyseter; Lambert, Bianucci & Muizon, 2008

Type species
- †Acrophyseter deinodon Lambert, Bianucci & Muizon, 2008

Other species
- †A. robustus Lambert, Bianucci & Muizon, 2017

= Acrophyseter =

Acrophyseter Temporal range: Miocene (Serravallian to Messinian), 13.65–5.33 Ma

Extinct genus of sperm whales

Acrophyseter is a genus of extinct sperm whale that lived in the Late Miocene off the coast of what is now Peru. The genus comprises two species: A. deinodon and A. robustus. It is part of a group of macroraptorial sperm whales that all share several features for hunting large prey, such as deeply rooted and thick teeth. Acrophyseter measured about 4–4.5 metres (13–15 ft) in length, making it the smallest macroraptorial sperm whale currently known. Because of its short pointed snout and strongly curved front teeth, it probably fed on the marine vertebrates of its time, such as seals and other whales.

== History of discovery ==
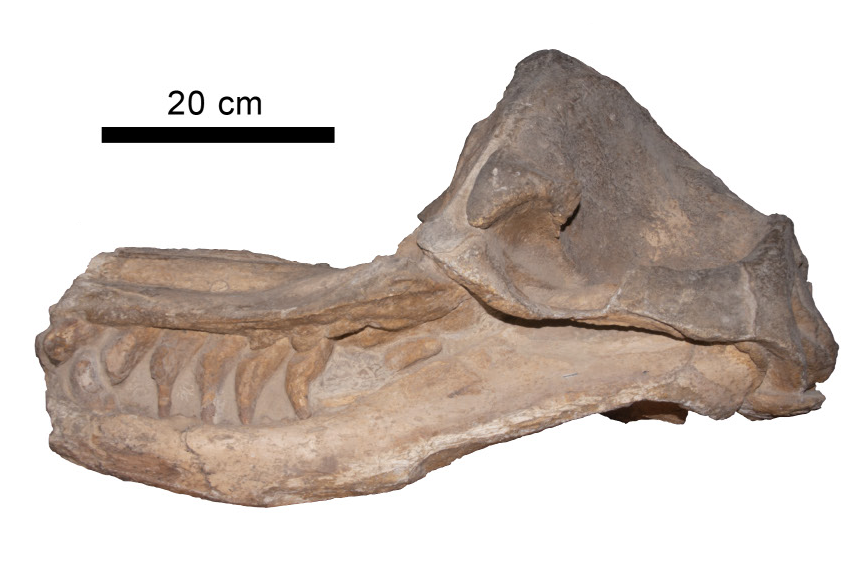
Holotype skull of A. robustus

All known fossils of Acrophyseter, including those of the two named species, were discovered in the Pisco Formation, located in southern Peru. The type species, A. deinodon, was described in 2008 by Olivier Lambert, Giovanni Bianucci and Christian De Muizon from a skull, catalogued MNHN SAS 1626, discovered in the Sud-Sacaco locality. This site is dated between the Tortonian and Messinian stages of the Miocene, around 8.5–6.7 million years ago. The specimen represents a mature individual and consists of a skull and jaw with most of the teeth intact.

In 2017, another species, A. robustus, was described by the same authors from a skull, catalogued as MUSM 1399, discovered in the Cerro la Bruja locality. This locality is older than Sud-Sacaco, dating between the Serravallian and Tortonian stages of the Miocene, at the least older than 9.2 million years. Later, a second A. deinodon specimen consisting of a right parietal bone was recovered from the Aguada de Lomas locality and recorded as MNHM F-PPI 272. The rocks at Aguada de Lomas are younger than both previously mentioned localities, and the specimen was dated to the Messinian stage of the Miocene, 6.9–6.7 mya. There have been doubts about its referral to A. deinodon, with some suggesting that it actually represents A. robustus instead.

A third Acrophyseter skull, catalogued MUSM 2182, was discovered in the Cerro los Quesos locality, dating from the same period as Aguada de Lomas. Its specific attribution has not been formally established, although it shares some similarities with the holotype skull of A. robustus.

The genus name Acrophyseter is derived from the Greek akros—meaning acute, which describes the short, pointed, upturned snout—and physeter—which is the genus name for the modern sperm whale Physeter macrocephalus. The species name deinodon is from the Greek deinos—meaning terrible—and odon—tooth. The species name robustus comes from Latin and references the thick bone constituting the edges of the supracranial basin and the base of the rostrum.

== Description ==
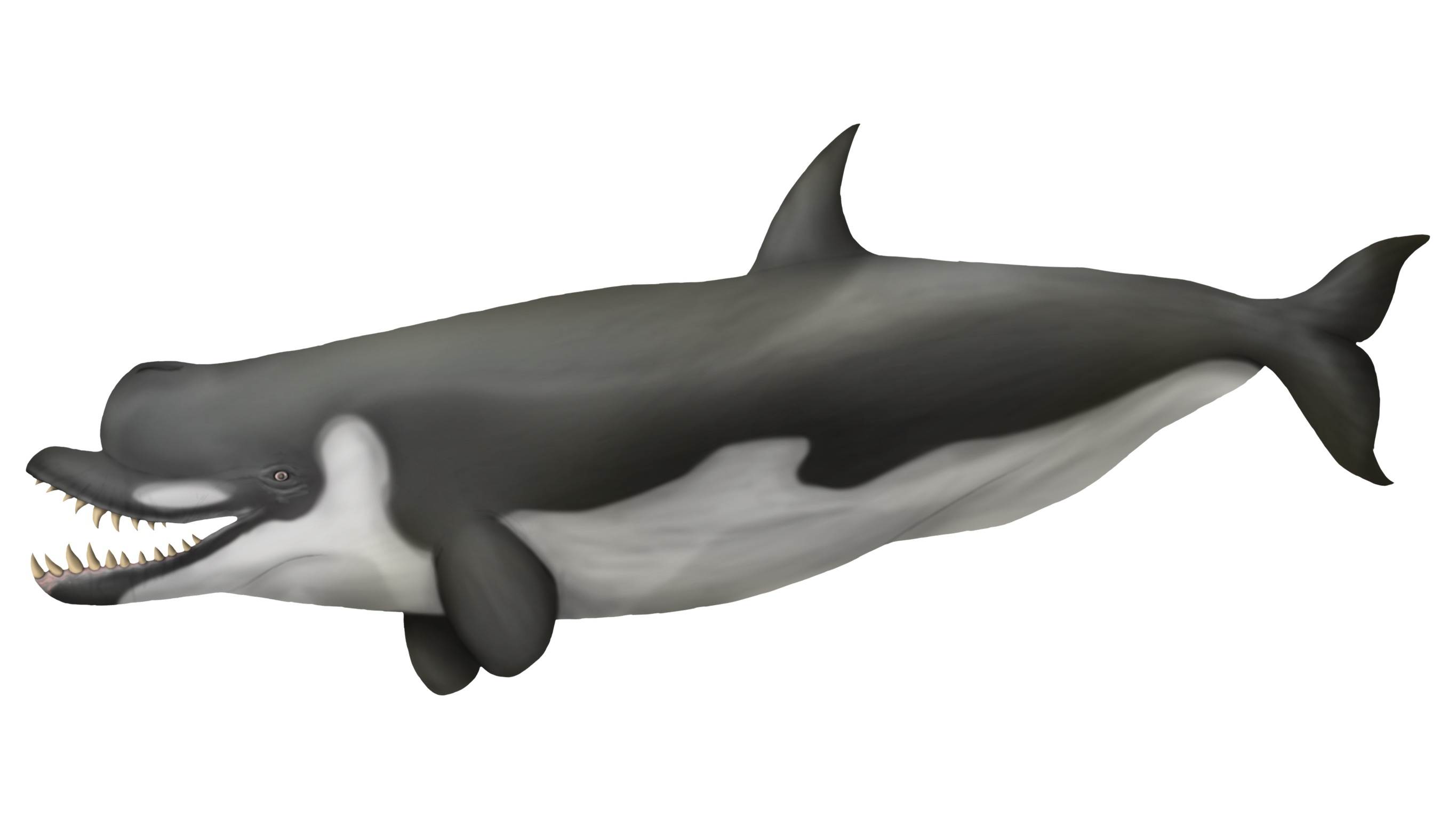
Restoration of A. robustus

Body length estimates for Acrophyseter range between about 4–4.5 metres (13–15 ft). Unlike modern sperm whales, A. deinodon had teeth in both its upper and lower jaws. The teeth were robust and deeply set into the roots, particularly the front teeth, the tooth roots were comparatively thick when compared to the thin tooth crown. The front teeth were more conical than those further back in the mouth. The lower back teeth were tightly packed, and the space between the teeth increased from front to back, suggesting they were used in a shearing motion. This suggests a different feeding strategy from modern sperm whales, which all use suction-feeding due to a lack of teeth in the upper jaw. The front teeth were more worn on the sides, whereas the lower teeth were more worn along the middle.

A. deinodon had 12 teeth in the upper jaw and 13 teeth in the lower jaw and possessed tooth enamel like other macroraptorial sperm whales. The premaxillae bore three teeth, and the maxillae had nine teeth. Unlike in other sperm whales, the top of the premaxillae near the vomer lacked a deep groove. The last lower teeth may have contacted the roof of the mouth, and cementum was continually added to the teeth as they were growing, as in killer whales (Orcinus orca). The tooth count of A. robustus is unknown, though it is thought to be similar to or the same as that of A. deinodon. Discovered along the tooth sockets were buccal exostoses: bony growths which may have developed during biting to strengthen the teeth, acting as buttresses. The back teeth had larger buccal exostoses as they experienced more pressure during biting.

A 2022 study which examined specimens of multiple phseteroids, including the holotype skull of A. deinodon discovered bite marks consistent with the teeth of either the modern Great White Shark (Carcharodon carcharias) or the extinct Otodontid shark Otodus megalodon on multiple regions of the skull.

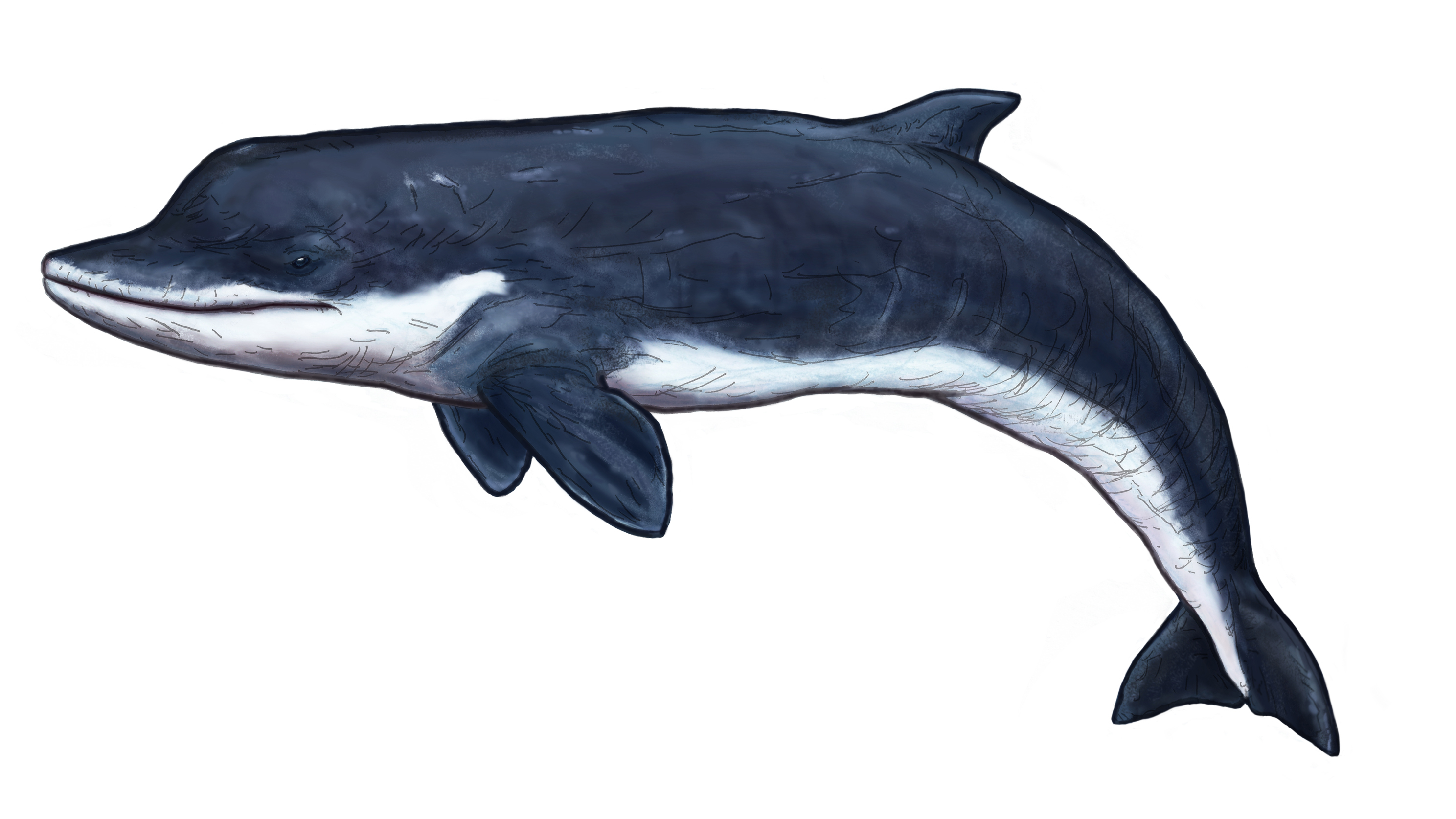
Restoration of A. deinodon

Like other sperm whales, Acrophyseter had a deepA. n the top of its skull, the supracranial basin. This is overhung by the nuchal crest on the back of the skull. The supracranial basin, in turn, overhangs the orbit around the eye but does not extend onto the snout, unlike in other macroraptorial sperm whales. The temporal fossae on the sides of the skull were as high as they were long, unlike in Zygophyseter and Brygmophyseter. This displaces the brow ridge, which slopes down at an angle of around 55 degrees. Acrophyseter's cheekbones were thin plates which limited the ear canals. The snout was short and, unlike in other sperm whales, had a distinct upward curve. The masseter muscles, used in chewing, were located between the condyloid process, which connects the jaw with the skull, and the teeth. Unlike later species of sperm whales, Acrophyseter had two nostrils. The left nostril was five times bigger than the right nostril, measuring 30 and 7.2 millimetres (1.18 and 0.28 in) across, respectively.

== Taxonomy ==
Acrophyseter belongs to a group of macroraptorial sperm whales together with Brygmophyseter, Livyatan and Zygophyseter. They all have large, deeply rooted teeth coated in enamel in both the upper and lower jaws and were adapted for hunting large prey items. Macroraptorial sperm whales are thought to have either evolved these adaptations from a basilosaurid-like ancestor or independently once or twice within the group. The extinct subfamily Hoplocetinae has been proposed to house this group, alongside the genera Scaldicetus, Diaphorocetus, Idiorophus and Hoplocetus. However, this grouping is paraphyletic, meaning it does not consist of a common ancestor and all of its descendants. Relationships between Acrophyseter and other sperm whales are shown below, with the macroraptorial sperm whales in bold and the clades Kogiidae and Physeteridae collapsed.

- Physeteroidea
  - Eudelphis
  - - - †**Zygophyseter**
      - †**Brygmophyseter**
    - †**Acrophyseter**
  - - †**Livyatan**
    - - †Aulophyseter?
      - - Physeteridae
        - Kogiidae

== Paleobiology ==
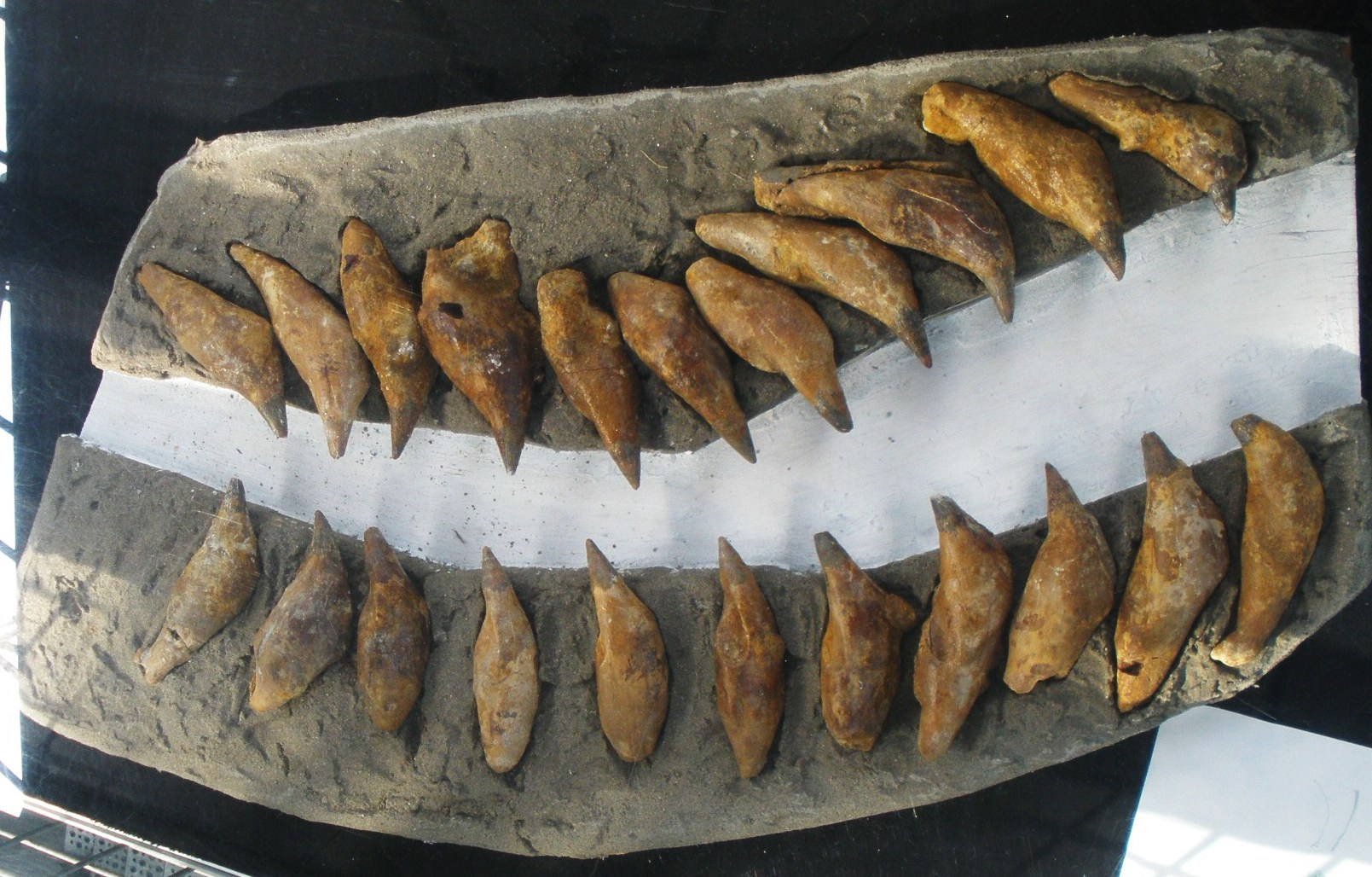
Upper and lower teeth

Features like the short, pointed snout, and robust, curved front teeth suggest that Acrophyseter targeted large prey. Their back teeth were potentially utilised in a shearing motion. It is thought that Acrophyseter would have preyed upon the numerous marine vertebrates that lived alongside it. Taphonomic evidence of predation includes numerous bite marks on cetacean and pinniped bones, primarily attributed to sharks but potentially involving macroraptorial sperm whales like Acrophyseter in the competitive apex predator guild.

A species ecologically similar to Acrophyseter Killer whales are highly social and hunt cooperatively, a pattern that cannot be inferred (or discounted) for macroraptorial sperm whale, given the contrasting social habits of extant physeteroids.

== Paleoecology ==
The localities of the Pisco Formation where remains of the animal have been found have yielded the remains of numerous marine vertebrates: the whales Piscolithax and Piscobalaena, the dolphins Brachydelphis, Atocetus iquensis, and Belonodelphis, the seal Acrophoca, the penguins Spheniscus urbinai and Spheniscus muizoni, the marine sloth Thalassocnus natans, the crocodile Piscogavialis, and the megalodon and broad-toothed mako sharks (Cosmopolitodus hastalis) and the Giant white shark (Carcharodon plicatilis). Acrophyseter was restricted primarily to preying on seals, dolphins, marine sloths, seabirds, and actinopterygians.
