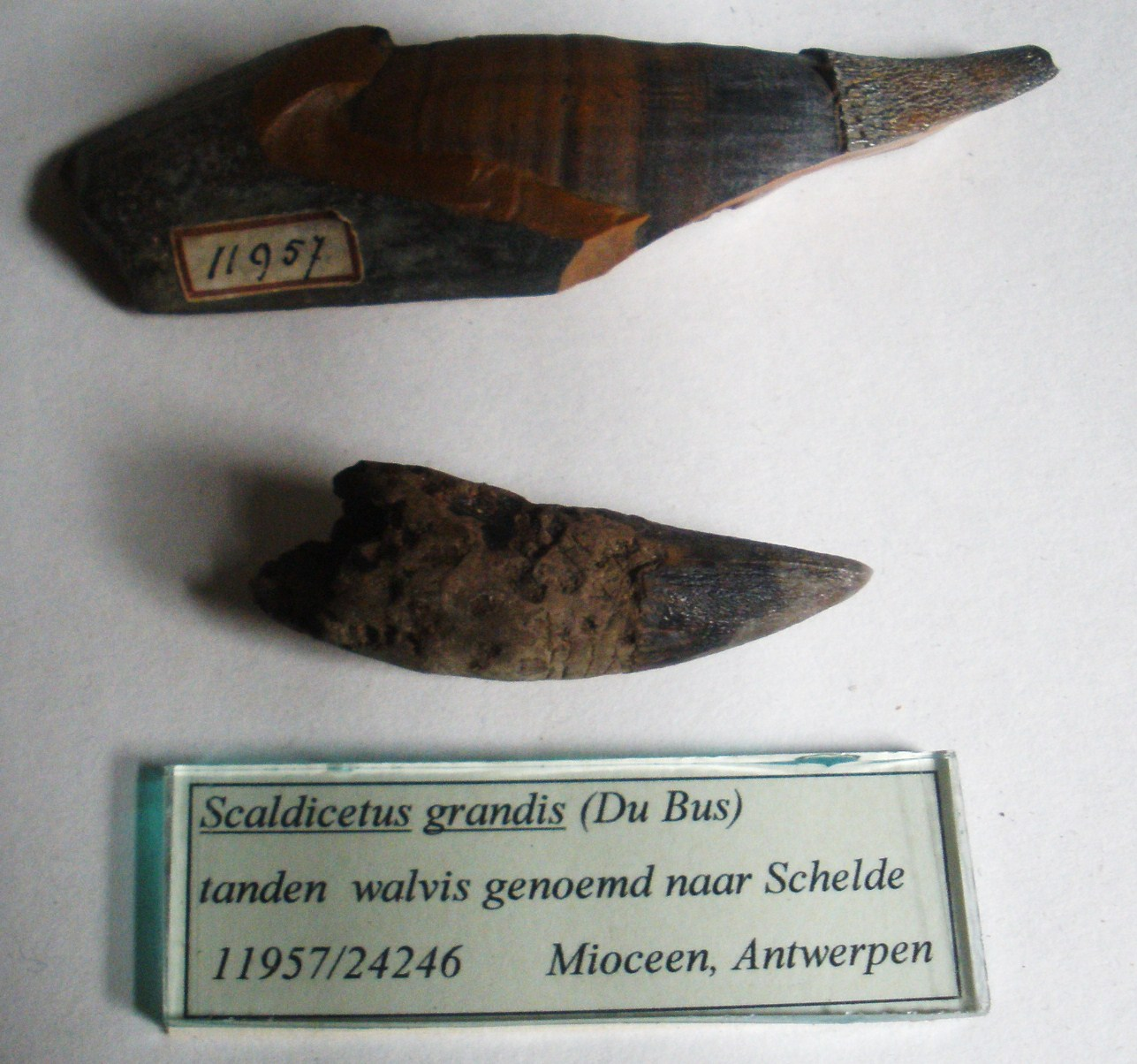
- Scaldicetus grandis teeth

Scientific classification
- Kingdom: Animalia
- Phylum: Chordata
- Class: Mammalia
- Order: Artiodactyla
- Infraorder: Cetacea
- Superfamily: Physeteroidea
- Family: Physeteridae
- Genus: †Scaldicetus; Du Bus, 1867

Species
- Scaldicetus caretti du Bus, 1867 (type); Scaldicetus grandis (du Bus, 1872)

Synonyms
- List of synonyms: S. caretti; Balænodon physaloides Owen, 1846; Belemnoziphius (Balænodon) physaloides Lankester, 1865; Physeter physaloides von Brandt, 1873; Hoplocetus physaloides Trouessart, 1898; Hoplocetus crassidens Lydekker, 1887; Hoplocetus curvidens Gervais; Hoplocetus obesus Leidy, 1868; Hoplocetus borgerhoutensis du Bus; Eucetus amblydon Lydekker, 1887; Homœcetus villersii de Bus; Dinoziphius carolinensis Leidy, 1877; Physeter carolinensis Hay, 1902; Palæodelphis arcuatis du Bus, 1872; Palæodelphis fusiformis du Bus, 1872; Palæodelphis zonatus du Bus, 1872; Palæodelphis pachyodon du Bus, 1872; Physodon fusiformis Lydekker, 1887; Scaldicetus antwerpiensis de Bus, 1972 S. grandis; Glossoptera lunebergica Leibniz, 1749; Squalodon graleloupi Staring, 1857; Squalodon antwerpiensis Lankester, 1865; Palæodelphis grandis du Bus, 1872

= Scaldicetus =

Scaldicetus Temporal range: Early Miocene-Early Pleistocene ~20.4–1.8 Ma

Extinct genus of mammals

Scaldicetus is an extinct genus of highly predatory macroraptorial sperm whale. Although widely used for a number of extinct physeterids with primitive dental morphology consisting of enameled teeth, Scaldicetus as generally recognized appears to be a wastebasket taxon filled with more-or-less unrelated primitive sperm whales.

== Taxonomy ==
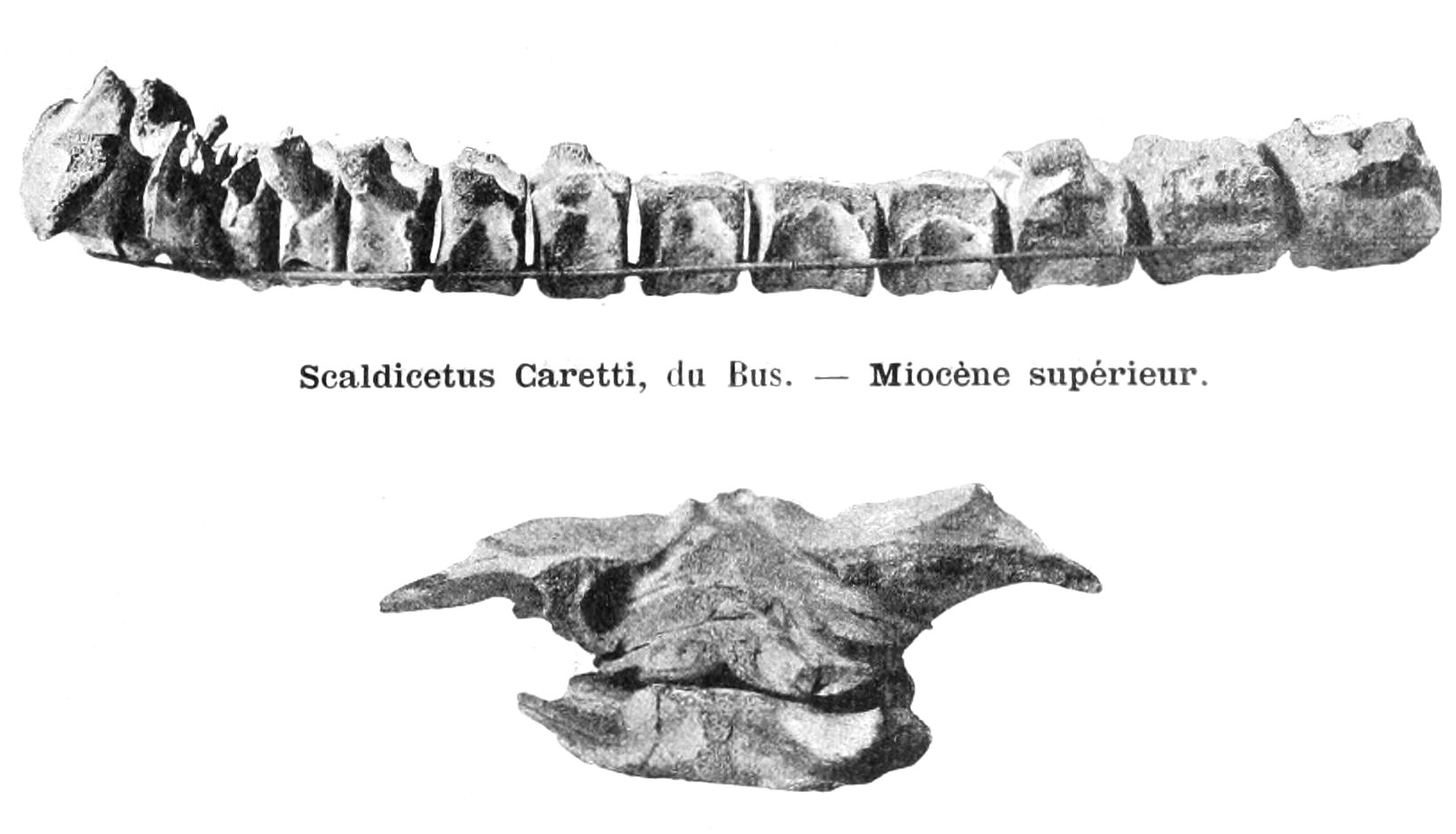
Scaldicetus caretti vertebrae

Scaldicetus is known from the Miocene to Pleistocene deposits of Western Europe, the U.S. (California, Florida, Maryland, Virginia), Baja Peninsula, Peru, New South Wales, and Japan. However, Scaldicetus is probably a grade taxon, and fossil teeth assigned to it (largely due to the lack of distinguishing characteristics in fossil teeth alone) probably represent more-or-less unrelated sperm whales united by their primitive characteristics rather than actual ancestry. Consequently, this would inflate the genus's distribution.

The name Scaldicetus caretti was coined in 1867 from numerous sperm whale teeth collected in Neogene deposits near Antwerp, Belgium probably from the early-to-middle Miocene Bercham Formation. However, some of these remains may have been reworked and redeposited into younger rocks. More remains also near Antwerp from the Diest Formation date to the Tortonian (late Miocene).

Synonyms of Scaldicetus include Palaeodelphis, Homocetus, and Eucetus. The genus Physodon described by French paleontologist Paul Gervais in 1872 was previously considered a synonym, but it was declared a nomen dubium in 2006.

Scaldicetus is sometimes classified into the dubious subfamily Hoplocetinae along with Diaphorocetus, Idiorophus, and Hoplocetus based on the presence of large, robust, enamel-coated teeth. The macroraptorial sperm whales Livyatan, Zygophyseter, Brygmophyseter, and Acrophyseter potentially also belong to this subfamily.

"Ontocetus" oxymycterus, described from the middle Miocene (Langhian) of Santa Barbara, California, was assigned to Scaldicetus in 2008, but was subsequently made the type of a new genus, Albicetus.

== Description ==
Unlike the modern sperm whale which only has teeth on the bottom jaw, Scaldicetus had teeth in both jaws. The lectotype for S. caretti had at least 45 teeth in total in its mouth in life. Like other macroraptorial sperm whales but unlike the modern sperm whale, the teeth were covered in a thick enamel coating, about 1.2–1.3 mm (0.047–0.051 in) thick. The teeth were moderately curved and were deeply rooted into the skull, implying a strong bite.

Like in other sperm whales, tooth dimensions vary widely; for the lectotype: the total length of the tooth root (the part of the tooth beneath the gum line) is between 106.9–203.5 mm (4.21–8.01 in) and the maximum total length of the entire tooth is 233 mm (9.2 in). Like in other macroraptorial sperm whales, tooth size increased from the back of the jaw to the front. The maximum diameter of the crown (the part of the tooth that is visible and erupts from the gum line) ranges from 16–32.5 mm (0.63–1.28 in), and diameter was greatest midway up the tooth.

== Paleobiology ==
The teeth of the lectotype of S. caretti exhibit vertical root fractures which were probably brought on by chewing hard food or repetitive application of excessive force while chewing or biting. It is likely these injuries were sustained while biting a fairly large vertebrate, such as various marine mammals as other macroraptorial sperm whales are suspected of hunting.

However, the killer whale–which preys on large marine mammals–is not known to exhibit these fractures, though this may be because killer whale teeth are more resistant to shock, having a smaller pulp cavity and, thus, a thicker tooth. Further, terrestrial carnivores that chew through bone display these fractures, and those that prey on larger prey have larger tooth roots. Like in the killer whale, Scaldicetus may have mashed its food in smaller pieces to ease swallowing, which would have increased the risk of hitting bone which would cause such fractures.

Like other macroraptorial sperm whales, Scaldicetus probably occupied the same niche as the killer whale.

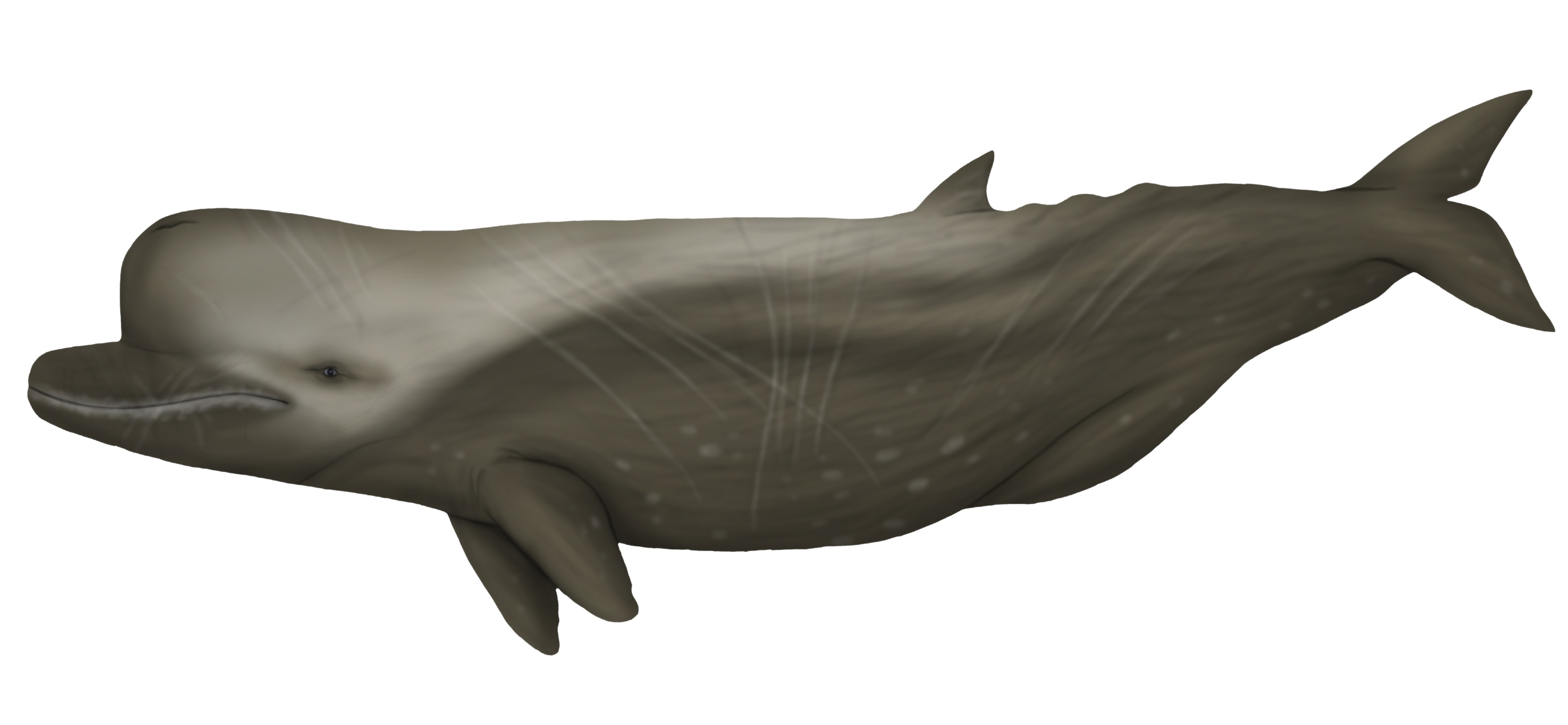
Life reconstruction of S. caretti

== Paleoecology ==
The Deist Formation, judging from the mollusk assemblage, probably represented a shallow sea with volatile ocean currents, moving sand bars, and megaripples. Whale remains include a cetotheriid baleen whale, the baleen whale Plesiocetus, a kentriodontid dolphin, and the beaked whale Ziphirostrum. Shark remains were not very common; those found belong to the extinct broad-toothed mako (the ancestor of the great white shark), the extinct mako shark Isurus desori, a Squalus dogfish, the angelshark, a sand tiger shark, and a Pristiophorus sawshark.
