= Idiophyseter =

Idiophyseter Temporal range: Middle Miocene

Scientific classification
- Domain: Eukaryota
- Kingdom: Animalia
- Phylum: Chordata
- Class: Mammalia
- Order: Artiodactyla
- Infraorder: Cetacea
- Family: Physeteridae
- Subfamily: Physeterinae
- Genus: †Idiophyseter; R. Kellogg, 1925

Extinct genus of whales

Idiophyseter is a genus of macroraptorial sperm whale from the Miocene. Its fossils have been found in Templeton California. Idiophyseter was small in size compared to modern genera and its maxilla has single-rooted alveoli. It lacked ventral internal process of the sort present in the modern day genus of sperm whale (Physeter).
