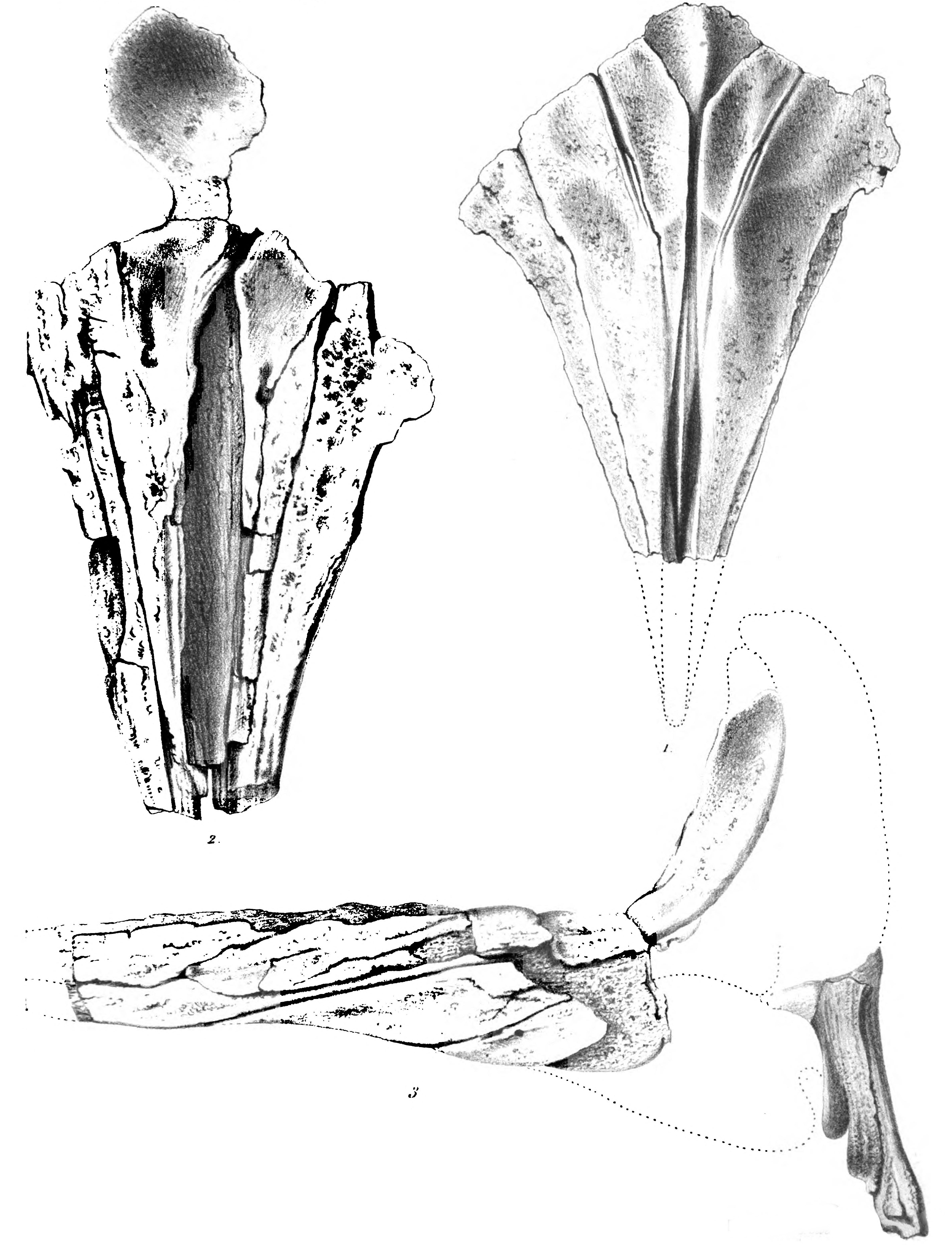

Scientific classification
- Kingdom: Animalia
- Phylum: Chordata
- Class: Mammalia
- Order: Artiodactyla
- Infraorder: Cetacea
- Family: Physeteridae
- Subfamily: Physeterinae
- Genus: †Placoziphius van Beneden, 1869
- Species: †P. duboisi

Binomial name
- †Placoziphius duboisi van Beneden, 1869

= Placoziphius =

Extinct genus of toothed whales

Placoziphius is an extinct genus of toothed whales that belongs to the subfamily Physeterinae. It lived in Belgium during the Miocene epoch.

It is larger than all known kogiid species and was similar in size to Diaphorocetus and the smallest specimens of Orycterocetus.

== Discovery ==
Remains of this genus were first uncovered in Belgium south to Antwerp from the Berchem formation in the Edegem Sands member.

The holotype specimen (IRSNB M.530) consist of a fragmentary skull. This included most of the rostrum, fragments of the supraorbital processes and of the supracranial basin, the two squamosal and exoccipital sets, and an associated fragment of atlas.
