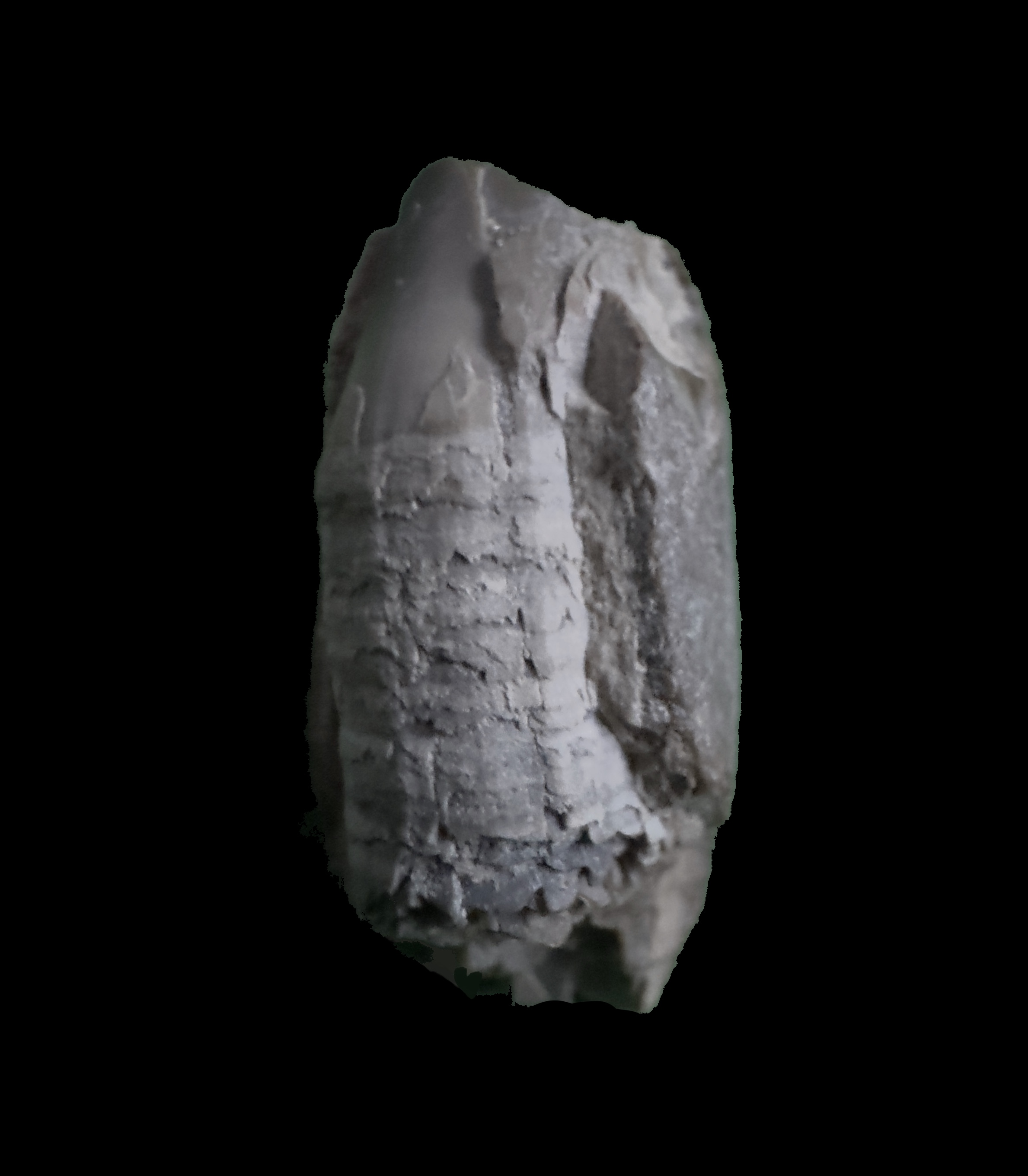
- Fragmentary Physeterula tooth from the Bone Valley Formation

Scientific classification
- Kingdom: Animalia
- Phylum: Chordata
- Class: Mammalia
- Order: Artiodactyla
- Infraorder: Cetacea
- Family: Physeteridae
- Subfamily: Physeterinae
- Genus: †Physeterula; Van Beneden, 1877

Type species
- †Physeterula dubusi Van Beneden, 1877

Other species
- †P. neolassicus Veatch and Stephenson, 1911

= Physeterula =

Physeterula Temporal range: Late Miocene–Late Pliocene

Extinct genus of mammals

Physeterula was a prehistoric close relative of the sperm whale that lived in Europe and the United States during the Late Miocene-Late Pliocene. This species is classified as a large-bodied species.

== Description ==
Physeterula retained functional maxillary teeth, although its tooth enamel had degenerated. Condylobasal length is estimated to have exceeded 137.5 cm. Physeterula was similar in size to Idiorophus, Zygophyseter, and Brygmophyseter.
