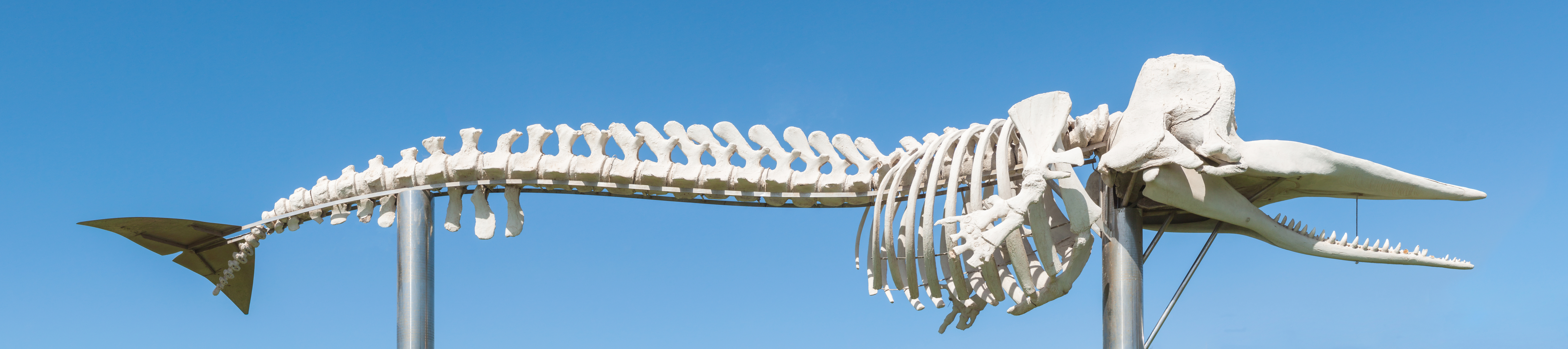
- Skeleton of a sperm whale, the only extant member of the genus

Scientific classification
- Kingdom: Animalia
- Phylum: Chordata
- Class: Mammalia
- Order: Artiodactyla
- Infraorder: Cetacea
- Family: Physeteridae
- Subfamily: Physeterinae
- Genus: Physeter; Linnaeus, 1758

Type species
- Physeter macrocephalus Linnaeus, 1758

Species
- Physeter macrocephalus; †Physeter antiquus

= Physeter =

Physeter Temporal range: Zanclean – Recent

Genus of mammals

Physeter is a genus of toothed whales. There is only one living species in this genus: the sperm whale (Physeter macrocephalus). Some extremely poorly known fossil species have also been assigned to the same genus including Physeter antiquus (5.3–2.6 mya) from the Pliocene of France, and Physeter vetus (2.6 mya – 12 ka) from the Quaternary of the U.S. state of Georgia. Physeter vetus is very likely an invalid species, as the few teeth that were used to identify this species appear to be identical to those of another toothed whale, Orycterocetus quadratidens.

Sperm whales spend more than 72% of their time engaged in foraging dive cycles. Foraging behavior, including buzz vocalizations for prey capture. The efficiency of sperm whale foraging is attributed to their effective long range echolocation, and efficient locomotion during deep dives.

The genus name is from Ancient Greek φυσητήρ (phūsētḗr), meaning 'blowpipe', 'blowhole'.
