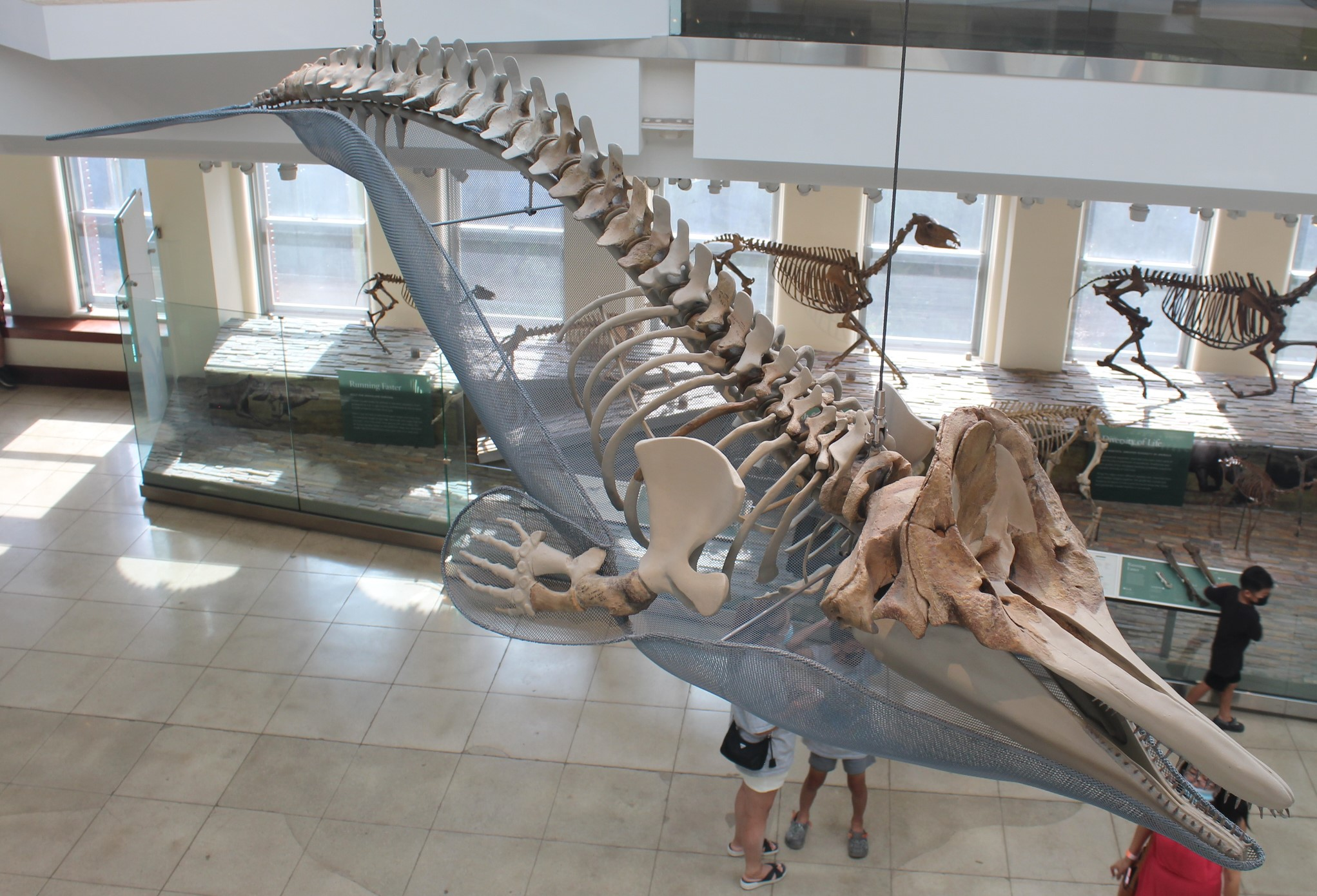
- Skeleton of A. morricei at the Natural History Museum of Los Angeles County

Scientific classification
- Kingdom: Animalia
- Phylum: Chordata
- Class: Mammalia
- Order: Artiodactyla
- Infraorder: Cetacea
- Family: Physeteridae
- Subfamily: Physeterinae
- Genus: Aulophyseter; Kellogg, 1927

Species
- A. morricei Kellogg, 1927 (type species); A. mediatlanticus Cope, 1895

= Aulophyseter =

Aulophyseter Temporal range: Mid-Late Miocene 16–15 Ma

Genus of mammals

Aulophyseter is an extinct genus of sperm whales from the subfamily Physeterinae that existed during the Miocene.

== History of discovery ==
Fossils of Aulophyseter have been found in:

- Oidawara Formation, Japan
- United States
  - Temblor Formation, California
  - St. Marys Formation, Maryland

== Description ==
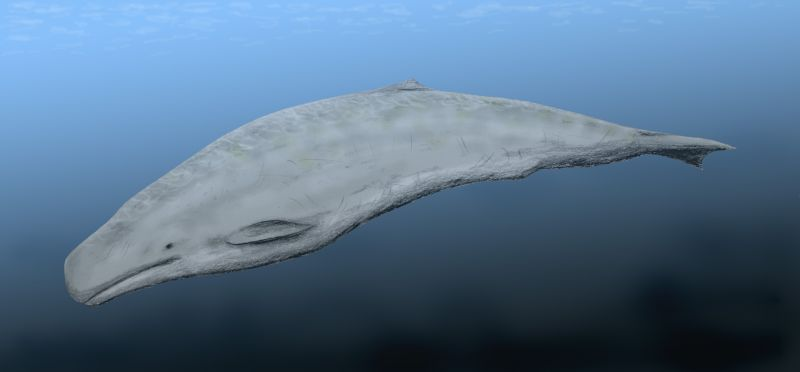
Life restoration

Aulophyseter is estimated to have been 6.4 metres (21 ft) long, and weighed approximately 1,100 kilograms (2,400 lb).

== Paleobiology ==
Aulophyseter's small teeth lack enamel, which suggests that its feeding habits were more similar to those of modern sperm whales than to other early sperm whales. The diet of Aulophyseter was largely limited to cephalopods and fish.

== See also ==
- Evolution of cetaceans
