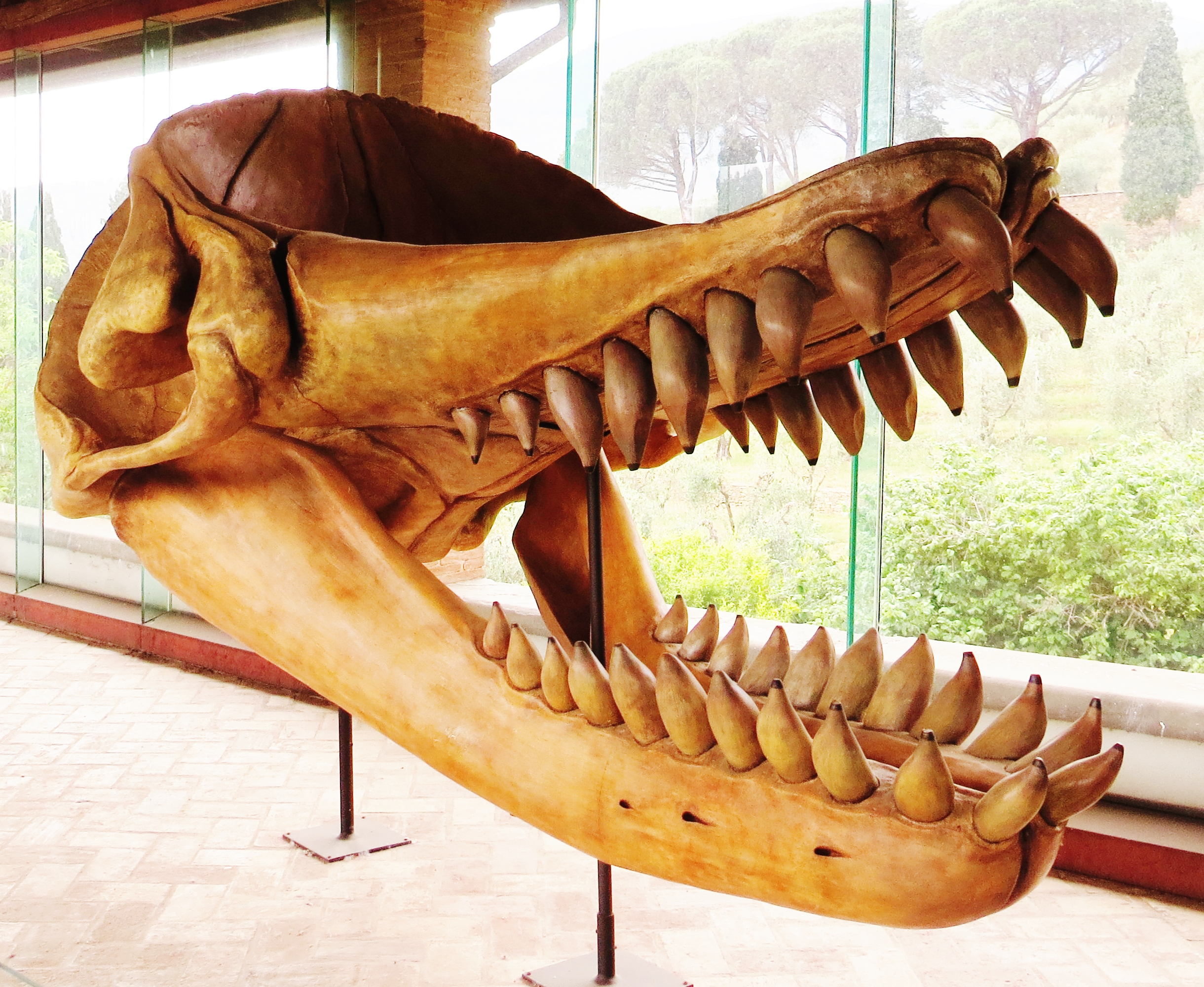
- Cast of skull at the Natural History Museum of the University of Pisa

Scientific classification
- Kingdom: Animalia
- Phylum: Chordata
- Class: Mammalia
- Order: Artiodactyla
- Infraorder: Cetacea
- Superfamily: Physeteroidea
- Genus: †Livyatan; Lambert et al., 2010
- Species: †L. melvillei

Binomial name
- †Livyatan melvillei Lambert et al., 2010

Synonyms
- Leviathan melvillei Lambert et al., 2010

= Livyatan =

Livyatan Temporal range: Tortonian-Zanclean, (Note: Zanclean range is based on Livyatan-like fossils assigned open nomenclature as cf. Livyatan. Upper range for confirmed L. melvillei is 8.9 mya) 10–5 Ma Possible Burdigalian records

Extinct genus of sperm whale from the Miocene epoch

Livyatan is an extinct genus of macroraptorial sperm whale, containing one known species: L. melvillei. The genus name was inspired by the biblical sea monster Leviathan, and the species name by Herman Melville, the author of the famous novel Moby-Dick about a white bull sperm whale. Herman Melville often referred to whales as "Leviathans" in his book. It is mainly known from the Pisco Formation of Peru during the Tortonian stage of the Miocene epoch, about 8.9–9.9 million years ago (mya); however, finds of isolated teeth from other locations such as Chile, Argentina, the United States (California), South Africa and Australia imply that either it or a close relative survived into the Pliocene, around 5 mya, and may have had a global presence.

The body length of Livyatan melvillei holotype is approximately 13.5–17.5 meters (44–57 ft) long. Comparable to that of the modern sperm whale (Physeter macrocephalus), making it one of the largest predators known. The teeth of Livyatan measured 36.2 cm (14.3 in) and are the largest biting teeth of any known animal, excluding tusks. It is distinguished from the other raptorial sperm whales by the basin on the skull spanning the length of the snout. The spermaceti organ contained in that basin is thought to have been used in echolocation and communication, or for ramming prey and other sperm whales. The whale may have interacted with the large extinct shark megalodon (Otodus megalodon), competing with it for a similar food source. Its extinction was probably caused by a cooling event at the end of the Miocene period causing a reduction in food populations. The geological formation where the whale has been found has also preserved a large assemblage of marine life, such as sharks and other marine mammals. Characteristically of raptorial sperm whales, Livyatan had functional, enamel-coated teeth on the upper and lower jaws, as well as several features suitable for hunting large prey.

== Research history ==
=== Holotype and naming ===
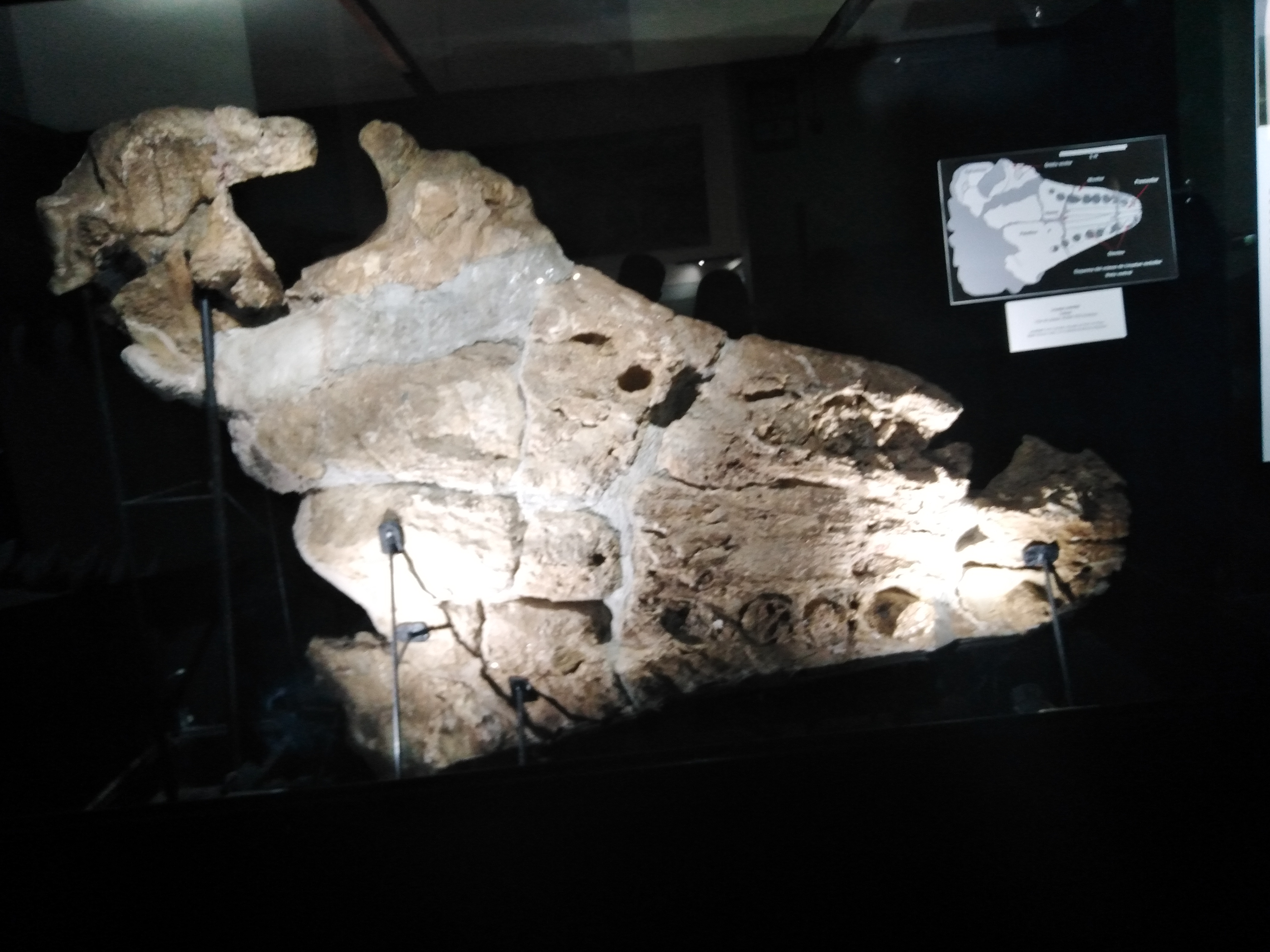
Skull of the holotype at the Museum of Natural History, Lima of National University of San Marcos

In November 2008, a partially preserved skull with the teeth and lower jaw, the holotype specimen (MUSM 1676) of Livyatan melvillei, was discovered in the coastal desert of Peru in the sediments of the Pisco Formation, 35 km (22 mi) southwest of the city of Ica. Klaas Post, a researcher for the Natural History Museum Rotterdam in the Netherlands, stumbled across them on the final day of a field trip. The fossils were prepared in Lima, and are now part of the collection of the Museum of Natural History, Lima of National University of San Marcos.

The discoverers originally assigned the English name of the biblical monster, Leviathan, to the whale as Leviathan melvillei. However, the scientific name Leviathan was preoccupied by Leviathan Koch, 1841, a junior synonym for the mastodon (Mammut). In August 2010, the authors rectified this situation by coining a new genus name for the whale, Livyatan, from the original Hebrew name of the monster. The species name melvillei is a reference to Herman Melville, author of the book Moby-Dick, which features a gigantic sperm whale as the main antagonist. The first Livyatan fossils from Peru were initially dated to around 13–12 million years ago (mya) in the Serravallian Age of the Miocene, but this was revised to 9.9–8.9 mya in the Tortonian Age of the Miocene.

=== Additional specimens ===
Approximate localities of L. melvillei (green) and Livyatan-like fossils from the Miocene (orange) and Pliocene (turquoise) around the world

During the late 2010s and into the 2020s, fossils of large isolated sperm whale teeth were reported from various Miocene and Pliocene localities, mostly from the Southern Hemisphere. These teeth have been identified as similar in size and shape to those of the L. melvillei holotype and may represent species of Livyatan. However, it is commonplace that authors do not identify such teeth as a conclusive species of Livyatan, instead opting to assign an open nomenclature in which the biological classifications of the specimens are restricted to comparisons or affinities with Livyatan. This is mostly because isolated teeth tend to not be informative enough to be identified at the species level, meaning that there is some undeterminable possibility that they belong to an undescribed close relative of Livyatan rather than Livyatan itself.

In 2016, in Beaumaris Bay, Australia, a large sperm whale tooth measuring 30 cm (1 ft), specimen NMV P16205, was discovered in Pliocene strata by a local named Murray Orr, and was nicknamed the "Beaumaris sperm whale" or the "giant sperm whale". The tooth was donated to Museums Victoria at Melbourne. Though it has not been given a species designation, the tooth looks similar to those of L. melvillei, indicating it was a close relative. The tooth is dated to around 5 mya, and so is younger than the L. melvillei holotype by around 4 or 5 million years.

In 2018, palaeontologists led by David Sebastian Piazza, while revising the collections of the Bariloche Paleontological Museum and the Municipal Paleontological Museum of Lamarque, uncovered two incomplete sperm whale teeth cataloged as MML 882 and BAR-2601 that were recovered from the Saladar Member of the Gran Bajo del Gualicho Formation in the Río Negro Province of Argentina, a deposit that dates between around 20–14 mya. The partial teeth measure 142 millimetres (6 in) and 178 millimetres (7 in) in height, respectively. Anatomical analyses of the specimens found that many of their characteristics are identical to L. melvillei except in width, in which the diameter of both teeth are smaller. Because of this, along with only isolated teeth being available, the palaeontologists chose to assign an open nomenclature, identifying both specimens as aff. Livyatan sp.

In 2019, palaeontologist Romala Govender reported the discovery of two large sperm whale teeth from Pliocene deposits near the Hondeklip Bay village of Namaqualand in South Africa. The pair of teeth, which are stored in the Iziko South African Museum and cataloged as SAM-PQHB-433 and SAM-PQHB-1519, measure 325.12 millimetres (13 in) and 301.2 millimetres (12 in) in height, respectively, the latter having its crown missing. Both teeth have open pulp cavities, indicating that both whales were young. The teeth are very similar in shape and size to the mandibular teeth of the L. melvillei holotype, and were identified as cf. Livyatan. Like the Beaumaris specimen, the South African teeth are dated to around 5 mya.

In 2025, Kristin Watmore and Donald Prothero reported a giant sperm whale tooth identified as cf. Livaytan discovered in Mission Viejo, California, during housing development during the 1980s and '90s. The tooth resided in the Orange County Paleontological Collection, cataloged as OCPC 3125/66099, and was incomplete but nevertheless measured at least 250 millimetres (10 in) in length and 86 millimetres (3 in) in diameter. Due to poor geographic recording at the time of its discovery, the exact stratigraphic locality was unknown, but it was reported to have come from a zone that contains both the mid-Miocene Monterey Formation and younger Capistrano Formation, the latter dating between 6.6 and 5.8 mya. The authors found the preservation of the tooth to be more consistent with Capistrano Formation fossils. The broken tooth surface exposed layers of cementum and dentin whose thicknesses fall within the known range of L. melvillei teeth. OCPC 3125/66099 represented the first evidence that either Livyatan or Livyatan-like whales were not restricted to the Southern Hemisphere and likely indicated a possibly global distribution of the cetaceans.

== Description ==
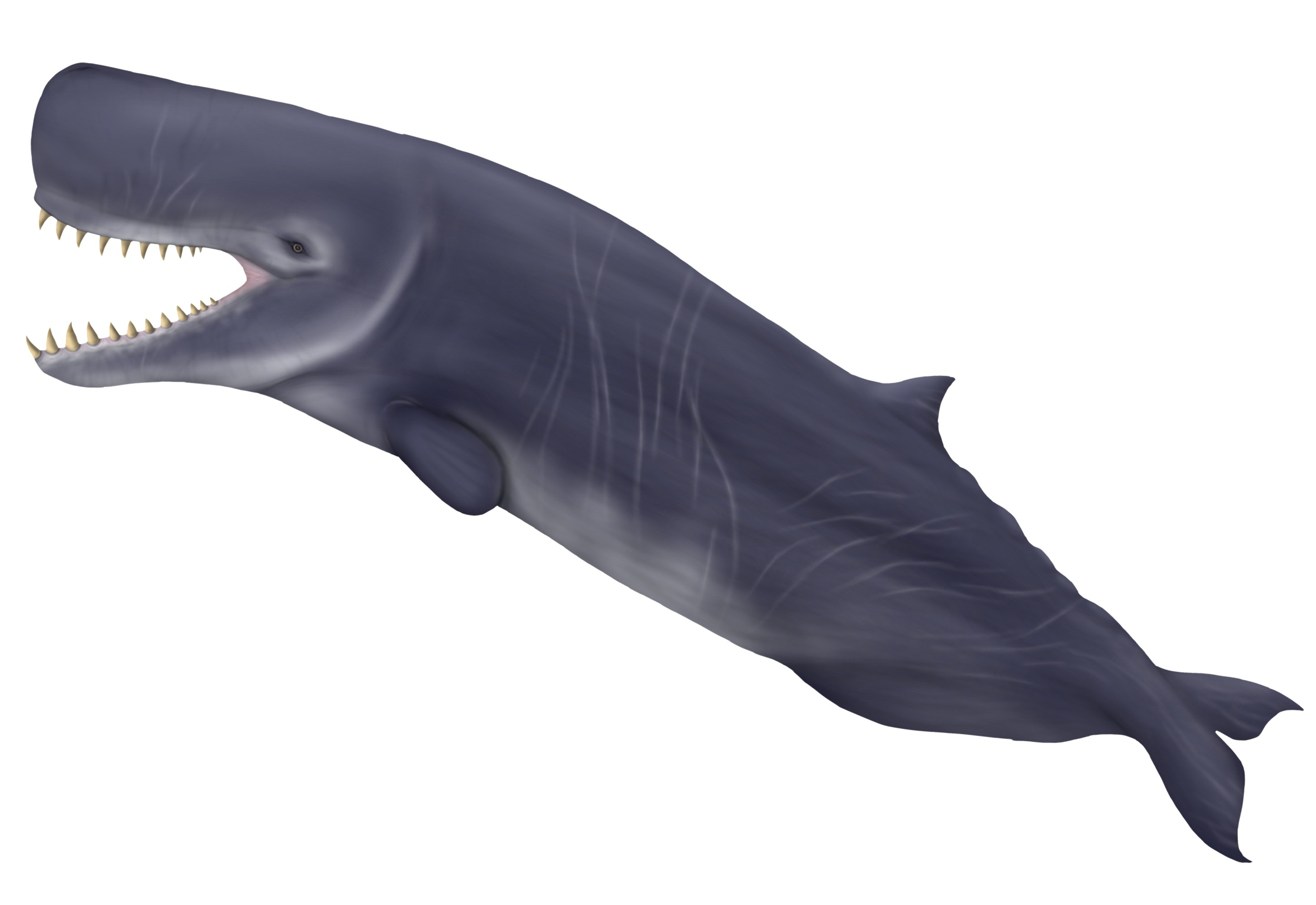
Life restoration with speculative postcranial

The body length of Livyatan melvillei is estimated around 13.5–17.5 meters (44–57 ft) mainly based on the holotype skull due to the lack of postcranial remains. Lambert and colleagues estimated the body length of Livyatan by comparing it to other physeteroids, Zygophyseter and modern sperm whales. The authors opted to use the relationship between the bizygomatic width (distance between the opposite zygomatic processes) of the skull and body length because of the variable rostrum length in modern sperm whales and the rostrum of Livyatan being proportionally shorter. This approach yielded length estimates of 13.5 m (44 ft) using modern sperm whales and 16.2–17.5 m (53–57 ft) using Zygophyseter, with the latter range caused by the incompleteness of the Zygophyseter type specimen. It has been estimated to weigh 57 tonnes (62.8 short tons) based on the length estimate of 17.5 m (57 ft). A 2025 study estimated the body length of Livyatan Holotype approximately between 11.54–13.39 metres (37.9–43.9 ft) and 16.04 metres (52.6 ft) with the former potentially being an underestimation as the equations used for those estimates may underestimate total body length^{Supplementary Data Table S1}. By comparison, the modern sperm whale length measures on average 11 m (36 ft) for females and 16 m (52 ft) for males, with some males reaching up to 20.7 m (68 ft). The large size was probably an anti-predator adaptation, and allowed it to feed on larger prey. Livyatan is the largest extinct physeteroid discovered, possibly having one of the strongest bite forces of any tetrapod.

Diagram comparing the upper and lower size estimates of Livyatan (bottom three) with the size of mature sperm whales, including one of the largest individuals recorded (top three), and a human

=== Skull ===
The holotype skull of Livyatan was about 3 m (9.8 ft) long. Like other raptorial sperm whales, Livyatan had a wide gap in between the temporal fossae on the sides of the skull and the zygomatic processes on the front of the skull, indicating a large space for holding strong temporal muscles, which are the most powerful muscles between the skull and the jaw. The snout was robust, thick, and relatively short, which allowed it to clamp down harder and better handle struggling prey. The left and right premaxillae on the snout probably did not intersect at the tip of the snout, though the premaxillae took up most of the front end of the snout. Unlike in the modern sperm whale, the premaxillae reached the sides of the snout. The upper jaw was thick, especially midway through the snout. The snout was asymmetrical, with the right maxilla in the upper jaw becoming slightly convex towards the back of the snout, and the left maxilla becoming slightly concave towards the back of the snout. The vomer reached the tip of the snout and was slightly concave, decreasing in thickness from the back to the front. A sudden thickening in the middle-left side of the vomer may indicate the location of the nose plug muscles. Each mandible in the lower jaw was higher than it was wide, with a larger gap in between the two than in the modern sperm whale. The mandibular symphysis, which connects the two halves of the mandibles in the middle of the lower jaw, was unfused. The condyloid process, which connects the lower jaw to the skull, was located near the bottom of the mandible, like other sperm whales. The head probably took up 17–22% of the total body size, compared to that of the modern sperm whale which takes up around one fourth to one third of the total body size. Like in other sperm whales, the blowhole was slanted towards the left side of the animal, and it may have lacked a right nasal passage.

A 2022 study which examined specimens of multiple phseteroids, including the holotype skull of Livyatan discovered bite marks consistent with the teeth of either the modern Great White Shark (Carcharodon carcharias) or the extinct Otodus megalodon, these bite marks came from a region of the skull which would have only been accessible to scavengers.

==== Teeth ====
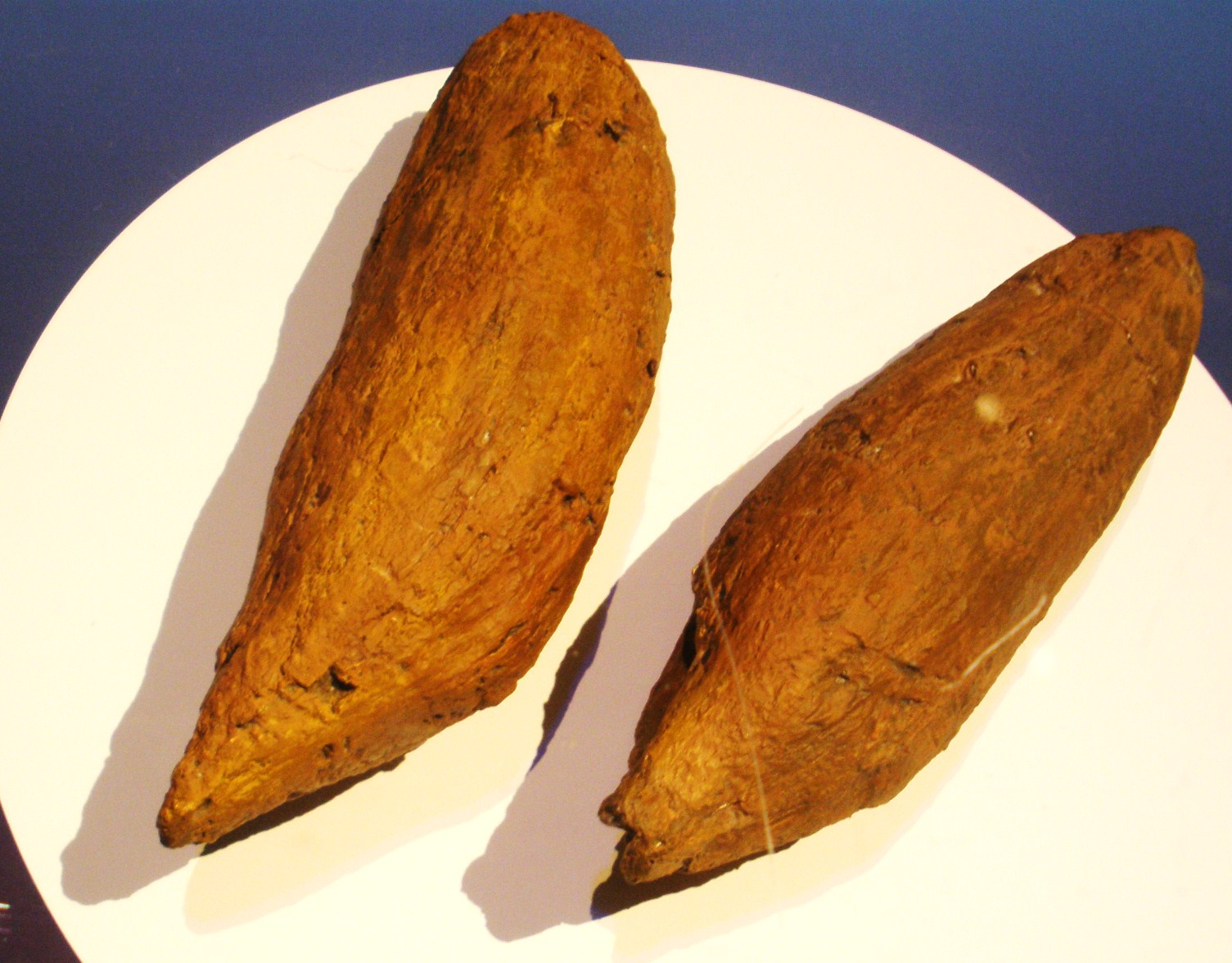
The teeth of Livyatan were among the biggest of any animal at over 31 cm (12 in) in length.

Unlike the modern sperm whale, Livyatan had functional teeth in both jaws. The wear on the teeth indicates that the teeth sheared past each other while biting down, meaning it could bite off large portions of flesh from its prey. Also, the teeth were deeply embedded into the gums and could interlock, which were adaptations to holding struggling prey. None of the teeth of the holotype were complete, and none of the back teeth were well-preserved. The lower jaw contained 22 teeth, and the upper jaw contained 18 teeth. Unlike other sperm whales with functional teeth in the upper jaw, none of the tooth roots were entirely present in the premaxilla portion of the snout, being at least partially in the maxilla. Consequently, its tooth count was lower than those sperm whales, and, aside from the modern dwarf (Kogia sima) and pygmy (K. breviceps) sperm whales, it had the lowest tooth count in the lower jaw of any sperm whale.

The most robust teeth in Livyatan were the fourth, fifth and sixth teeth in each side of the jaw. The well-preserved teeth all had a height greater than 31 cm (1 ft), and the largest teeth of the holotype were the second and third on the left lower jaw, which were calculated to be around 36.2 cm (1.2 ft) high. The first right tooth was the smallest at around 31.5 cm (1 ft). The Beaumaris sperm whale tooth measured around 30 cm (1 ft) in length, and is the largest fossil tooth discovered in Australia. These teeth are thought to be among the largest of any known animal, excluding tusks. Some of the lower teeth have been shown to contain a facet for when the jaws close, which may have been used to properly fit the largest teeth inside the jaw. In the front teeth, the tooth diameter decreased towards the base. This was the opposite for the back teeth, and the biggest diameters for these teeth were around 11.1 cm (4.4 in) in the lower jaw. All teeth featured a rapid shortening of the diameter towards the tip of the tooth, which were probably in part due to wear throughout their lifetimes. The curvature of the teeth decreased from front to back, and the lower teeth were more curved at the tips than the upper teeth. The front teeth projected forward at a 45° angle, and, as in other sperm whales, cementum was probably added onto the teeth throughout the animal's lifetime. Unlike the modern sperm whale which only has teeth on the bottom jaw, Livyatan had teeth in both jaws. The holotype for L. melvillei had at least 40 teeth in total in its mouth in life. Like other macroraptorial sperm whales but unlike the modern sperm whale, the teeth were covered in a thick enamel coating, about 110–120 mm (11.1–12 in). The teeth were moderately curved and were deeply rooted into the skull, implying a strong bite.

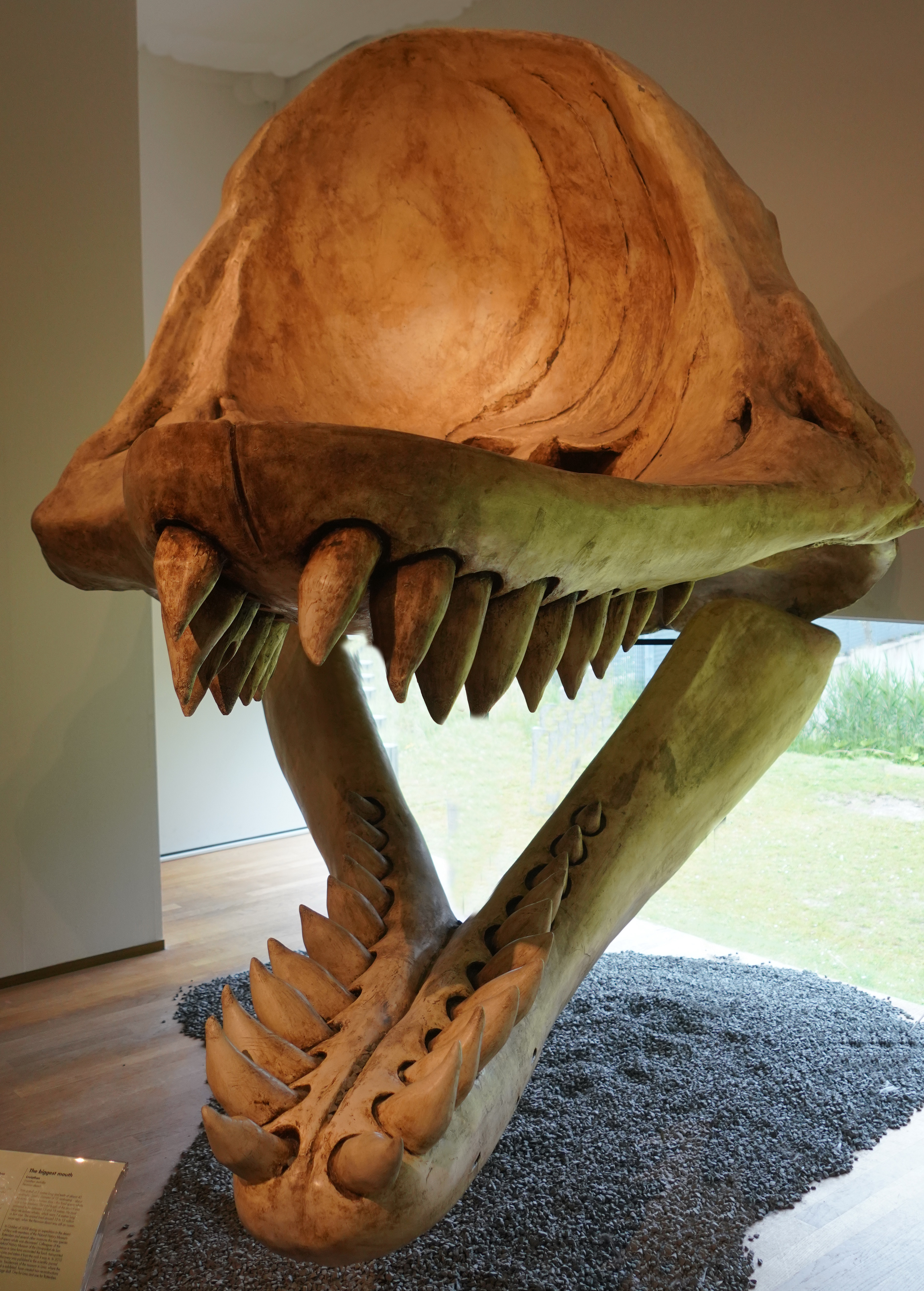
Reconstructed skull at Natuurhistorisch Museum Rotterdam

All tooth sockets were cylindrical and single-rooted. The tooth sockets increased in size from the first to the fourth and then decreased, the fourth being the largest at around 197 mm (7.8 in) in diameter in the upper jaws, which is the largest of any known whale species. The tooth sockets were smaller in the lower jaw than they were in the upper jaw, and they were circular in shape, except for the front sockets, which were more oval.

==== Basin ====
The fossil skull of Livyatan had a curved basin, known as the supracranial basin, which was deep and wide. Unlike other raptorial sperm whales, but much like in the modern sperm whale, the basin spanned the entire length of the snout, causing the entire skull to be concave on the top rather than creating a snout as seen in Zygophyseter and Acrophyseter. The supracranial basin was the deepest and widest over the braincase, and, unlike other raptorial sperm whales, it did not overhang the eye socket. It was defined by high walls on the sides. The antorbital notches, which are usually slit-like notches on the sides of the skull right before the snout, were inside the basin. A slanting crest on the temporal fossa directed towards the back of the skull separated the snout from the rest of the skull and was defined by a groove starting at the antorbital processes on the cheekbones. The basin had two foramina in the front, whereas the modern sperm whale has one foramen on the maxilla, and the modern dwarf and pygmy sperm whales have several in the basin. The suture in the basin between the maxilla and the forehead had an interlocking pattern.

== Classification ==
Livyatan was part of a fossil stem group of hyper-predatory sperm whales commonly known as macroraptorial sperm whales, or raptorial sperm whales, alongside the extinct whales Brygmophyseter, Acrophyseter and Zygophyseter. This group is known for having large, functional teeth in both the upper and lower jaws, which were used in capturing large prey, and had an enamel coating. Conversely, the modern sperm whale (Physeter macrocephalus) lacks teeth in the upper jaw, and the ability to use its teeth to catch prey. Livyatan belongs to a different lineage in respect to the other raptorial sperm whales, and the size increase and the development of the spermaceti organ, an organ that is characteristic of sperm whales, are thought to have evolved independently from other raptorial sperm whales. The large teeth of the raptorial sperm whales either evolved once in the group with a basilosaurid-like common ancestor, or independently in Livyatan. The large temporal fossa in the skull of raptorial sperm whales is thought to a plesiomorphic feature, that is, a trait inherited from a common ancestor. Since the teeth of foetal modern sperm whales (Physeter macrocephalus) have enamel on them before being coated with cementum, it is thought that the enamel is also an ancient characteristic (basal). The appearance of raptorial sperm whales in the fossil record coincides with the diversification of baleen whales in the Miocene, implying that they evolved specifically to exploit baleen whales. It has also been suggested that the raptorial sperm whales should be placed into the subfamily Hoplocetinae, alongside the genera Diaphorocetus, Idiorophus, Scaldicetus and Hoplocetus, which are known from the Miocene to the lower Pliocene. However, most of these taxa remain too fragmentary or have been used as wastebasket taxa for non-diagnostic material of stem physeteroids. This subfamily is characterized by their robust and enamel-coated teeth.

The cladograms below are modified from Lambert et al. (2017) and Paolucci et al. (2025), and represents the phylogenetic relationships between Livyatan and other sperm whales, with genera identified as macroraptorial sperm whales in bold.

Topology A: Lambert et al. (2017)
53 characters with down-weighting of homoplastic characters

- Physeteroidea
  - †Eudelphis
  - - - †**Zygophyseter**
      - †**Brygmophyseter**
    - †**Acrophyseter**
  - - †**Livyatan**
    - - †Cozzuoliphyseter
      - - Physeteridae
          - - †Orycterocetus
            - - †Idiorophus
              - †Physeterula
          - - - - †Idiophyseter
                - - Physeter
                  - †Aulophyseter
              - †Placoziphius
            - †Diaphorocetus
        - Kogiidae
          - - †Aprixokogia
            - - - Kogia
                - †Praekogia
              - †Scaphokogia
          - †Thalassocetus

Topology B: Paolucci et al. (2025)
60 characters with equal weights

- Physeteroidea
  - †Rhaphicetus
  - - - †Eudelphis
      - Macroraptorial group (Note: sensu Paolucci et al. (2025). Also named "Clade A" in Kimura & Hasegawa (2022) and "Zygophyseter clade" in Peri et al. (2022).)
        - - †**Brygmophyseter**
          - †**Zygophyseter**
        - - †**Acrophyseter**
    - - †Diaphorocetus
      - - - †Cozzuoliphyseter
          - †Placoziphius
        - - - †Orycterocetus
            - - †Thalassocetus
              - †Angelocetus
          - - Physeteridae
              - †Idiorophus
              - - †Physeterula
                - - Physeter
                  - †Aulophyseter
            - - †**Albicetus**
              - - †Miophyseter
                - - **†Livyatan**
                  - Kogiidae
                    - †Aprixokogia
                    - - †Pliokogia
                      - - - †Platyscaphokogia
                          - †Scaphokogia
                        - - †Koristocetus
                          - - †Nanokogia
                            - - †Praekogia
                              - Kogia

== Palaeobiology ==
Livyatan probably occupied the same niche as the modern killer whale (Orcinus orca).

Livyatan is inferred to have been a macroraptorial predator specializing in hypercarnivorous feeding on large marine vertebrates, including small cetaceans and pinnipeds, based on its cranial morphology and dentition adapted for grasping and tearing flesh. The retention of functional, enameled teeth in both upper and lower jaws, with conical crowns and robust roots up to 36.2 cm long, indicates a biting mechanism suited for capturing and processing mobile prey such as seals and smaller whales, contrasting with the suction-feeding, squid-focused diet as seen in the modern sperm whale. This predatory specialization aligns with the high diversity of marine mammals in the middle and late Miocene Pisco Formation, where L. melvillei likely targeted abundant large-sized vertebrates rather than soft-bodied cephalopods. This kind of macroraptorial predatory behavior is reconstructed as involving powerful jaw closure, facilitated by a structurally rigid rostrum with a closed mesorostral groove that enhanced stability during biting. The enameled tips of the teeth, featuring coarse longitudinal striations, suggest repeated occlusion and contact with hard tissues like bone or cartilage, implying a "grip-and-tear" strategy similar to that observed in coeval macroraptorial sperm whales such as Brygmophyseter and Zygophyseter. Wear patterns on preserved tooth fragments, including deep facets from tooth-to-tooth contact, further support frequent engagement with bony prey, though no direct evidence of gut contents or bite marks on associated fossils has been reported.

=== Hunting ===
Livyatan was an apex predator, and probably had a profound impact on the structuring of Miocene marine communities. Using its large and deeply rooted teeth, it is likely to have hunted large prey near the surface, its diet probably consisting mainly of medium-sized baleen whales ranging from 7–10 m (23.0–32.8 ft) in length. It probably also preyed upon sharks, seals, dolphins and other large marine vertebrates, occupying a niche similar to the modern killer whale (Orcinus orca). It was contemporaneous with and occupied the same region as the otodontid shark O. megalodon, which was likely also an apex predator, implying competition over their similar food sources. It is assumed that the hunting tactics of Livyatan for hunting whales were similar to that of the modern killer whale, pursuing prey to wear it out, and then drowning it. Modern killer whales work in groups to isolate and kill whales, but, given its size, Livyatan may have been able to hunt alone.

Isotopic analysis of enamel from a tooth from Chile revealed that this individual likely operated at latitudes south of 40°S. Isotopic analyses of contemporary baleen whales in the same formation show that this Livyatan was not commonly feeding on them, indicating it probably did not exclusively eat large prey, though it may have targeted baleen whales from higher latitudes.

=== Spermaceti organ ===
Diagram of the spermaceti organ in the modern sperm whale (Physeter macrocephalus)

The supracranial basin in its head suggests that Livyatan had a large spermaceti organ, a series of oil and wax reservoirs separated by connective tissue. The uses for the spermaceti organ in Livyatan are unknown. Much like in the modern sperm whale, it could have been used in the process of biosonar to generate sound for locating prey. It is possible that it was also used as a means of acoustic displays, such as for communication purposes between individuals. It may have been used for acoustic stunning, which would have caused the bodily functions of a target animal to shut down from exposure to the intense sounds.

Another theory says that the enlarged forehead caused by the presence of the spermaceti organ is used in all sperm whales between males fighting for females during mating season by head-butting each other, including Livyatan and the modern sperm whale. It may have also been used to ram into prey; if this is the case, in support of this, there have been two reports of modern sperm whales attacking whaling vessels by ramming into them, and the organ is disproportionally larger in male modern sperm whales.

An alternate theory is that sperm whales, including Livyatan, can alter the temperature of the wax in the organ to aid in buoyancy. Lowering the temperature increases the density to have it act as a weight for deep-sea diving, and raising the temperature decreases the density to have it pull the whale to the surface.

== Palaeoecology ==
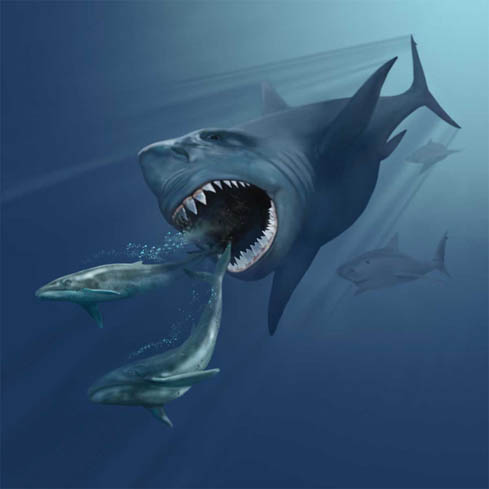
Megalodon (above) and Livyatan were apex predators of the same region. Artwork by Karen Carr

Fossils conclusively identified as L. melvillei have been found in Peru and Chile. However, additional isolated large sperm whale teeth from other locations including California, Australia, Argentina, South Africa and the Netherlands have been identified as a species or possible close relative of Livyatan. On the basis of these fossils, it was likely that the distribution of Livyatan was widespread. Prior to 2023, paleontologists initially believed that the genus was restricted to the Southern Hemisphere. The warmer waters around the equator have been known to be a climatic barrier for numerous cetaceans since Neogene times, and it was then-hypothesized is that Livyatan may have been among the cetaceans unable to cross the equatorial barrier. However, collecting bias was another explanation given the apparent rarity and poor fossil record of Livyatan, now supported by the Northern Hemisphere occurrence in California.

The holotype of L. melvillei is from the Tortonian stage of the Upper Miocene 9.9–8.9 mya in the Pisco Formation of Peru, which is known for its well-preserved assemblage of marine vertebrates. Among the baleen whales found, the most common was an undescribed species of cetotheriid whale measuring around 5 to 8 m (16 to 26 ft), and most of the other baleen whales found were roughly the same size. Toothed whale remains found consist of beaked whales (such as Messapicetus gregarius), ancient pontoporiids (such as Brachydelphis mazeasi), oceanic dolphins and the raptorial sperm whale Acrophyseter. All seal remains found represent the earless seals. Also found were large sea turtles such as Pacifichelys urbinai, which points to the development of seagrasses in this area. Partial bones of crocodiles were discovered. Of the seabirds, fragmentary bones of cormorants and petrels were discovered, as well as two species of boobies. The remains of many cartilaginous fish were discovered in this formation, including more than 3,500 shark teeth, which mainly belonged to the ground sharks, such as requiem sharks and hammerhead sharks. To a lesser extent, mackerel sharks were also found, such as white sharks, sand sharks and Otodontidae. Many shark teeth were associated with the extinct broad-tooth mako (Carcharodon hastalis) and megalodon, and the teeth of these two sharks were found near whale and seal remains. Eagle rays, sawfish and angelsharks were other cartilaginous fish found. Most of the bony fish findings belonged to tunas and croakers. Livyatan and megalodon were likely the apex predators of this area during this time.

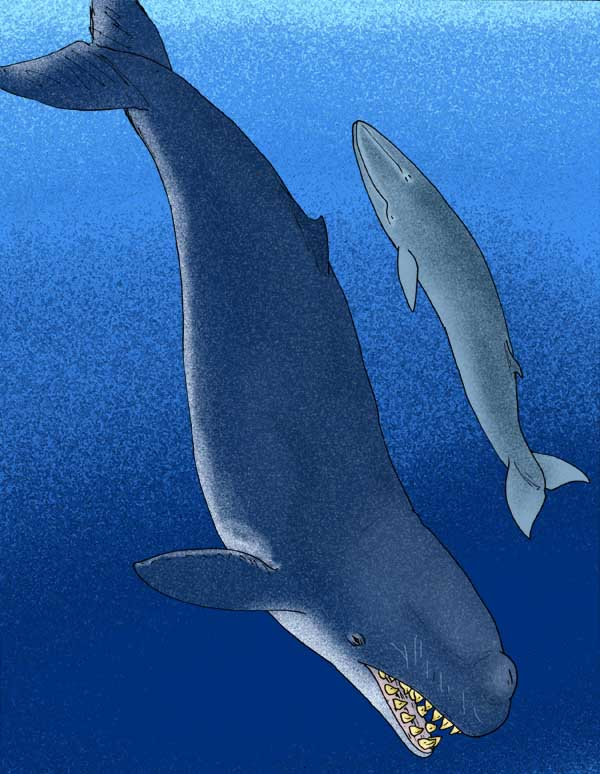
Reconstruction of Livyatan (left) next to Cetotherium (right)

L. melvillei is also known from the Bahía Inglesa Formation of Chile, whose fossiliferous beds are dated between the Tortonian and Messinian 9.03–6.45 mya. Like the Pisco Formation, the Bahía Inglesa Formation famously holds one of the richest marine vertebrate assemblages. Baleen whale remains include ancient minke whales, grey whales, bowhead whales and cetotheriids. Of the toothed whales, five species of pontoporiids as well as beaked whales, porpoises, three other species of sperm whales such as cf. Scaldicetus, and the Odobenocetops have been yielded. Other marine mammals include the marine sloth Thalassocnus and pinnipeds like Acrophoca. At least 28 different species of sharks have been described, including many extant ground sharks and white sharks as well as extinct species such as the false mako (Parotodus sp.), broad-toothed mako, megalodon and the transitional great white Carcharodon hubbelli. Other marine vertebrates include penguins and other seabirds, and species of crocodiles and ghavials.

The Beaumaris sperm whale was found in the Black Rock Sandstone Formation of Beaumaris Bay, in Australia near the city of Melbourne, dating to 5 mya in the Pliocene. Beaumaris Bay is one of the most productive marine fossil sites in Australia for marine megafauna. Shark teeth belonging to twenty different species have been discovered there, such as from the whale shark (Rhincodon typus), the Port Jackson shark (Heterodontus portusjacksoni), the broad-toothed mako and megalodon. Some examples of whales found include the ancient humpback whale Megaptera miocaena, the dolphin Steno cudmorei and the sperm whale Physetodon baileyi. Other large marine animals found include ancient elephant seals, dugongs, sea turtles, ancient penguins such as Pseudaptenodytes, the extinct albatross Diomedea thyridata and the extinct toothed seabirds of the genus Pelagornis.

The South African teeth attributed as cf. Livyatan are from the Avontuur Member of the Alexander Bay Formation near the village of Hondeklip Bay, Namaqualand, which is also dated to around 5 mya in the Pliocene. The Hondeklip Bay locality enjoys a rich heritage of marine fossils, whose diversity may have been thanks to the initiation of the Benguela Upwelling during the late Miocene, which likely provided large populations of phytoplankton traveling the cold nutrient-rich waters. Cetaceans are the most abundant fauna in the bay, although remains tend to be difficult to conclusively identify. Included are three species of balaenopterids including two undetermined species and one identified as cf. Plesiobalaenoptera, an ancient grey whale (cf. Eschrichtius sp.), an undetermined balaenid, an unidentified dolphin, and another undetermined species of macroraptorial sperm whale. Other localities of similar age on the South African west coast have also yielded many additional species of balaenopterids and sperm whales as well as ten species of beaked whales. Large sperm whale teeth of up to around ~20 cm (8 in) in length are common in Hondeklip Bay, indicating a high presence of large sperm whales like Livyatan in the area. The locality has also a high presence of sharks indicated by a large abundance of shark teeth; however, most of these teeth have not been identified. Megalodon teeth have been found in the bay, and evidence from bite marks in whale bones indicate the additional presence of the great white shark, shortfin mako and broad-toothed mako. Other marine fauna known in Hondeklip Bay include pinnipeds such as Homiphoca capensis, bony fish and rays.

=== Extinction ===
Livyatan-like sperm whales became extinct by the early Pliocene likely due to a cooling trend causing baleen whales to increase in size and decrease in diversity, becoming coextinct with the smaller whales they fed on. It has been hypothesized by some that their extinction was the result of competition large predatory globicephaline dolphins, however evidence for this hypothesis are largely unsupported.

== See also ==
- Basilosaurus
