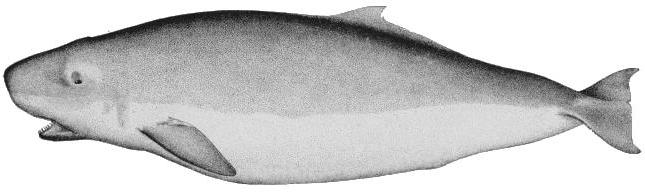
- Pygmy sperm whale (Kogia breviceps)

Scientific classification
- Kingdom: Animalia
- Phylum: Chordata
- Class: Mammalia
- Infraclass: Placentalia
- Order: Artiodactyla
- Infraorder: Cetacea
- Family: Kogiidae
- Subfamily: Kogiinae; Gill, 1871

= Kogiinae =

Subfamily of mammals

Kogiinae, also called little sperm whales is a subfamily of sperm whales in the family Kogiidae (the other subfamily being Scaphokogiinae). It comprises the extant genus Kogia and the extinct geners Praekogia and Pliokogia.
