= Tirabuzon Formation =

Geologic formation in Mexico

- Stratigraphic range: Pliocene
- Type: Formation

Lithology
- Primary: Siltstone, mudstone
- Other: Sandstone

Location
- Region: Baja California
- Country: Mexico

The Tirabuzon Formation is a geologic formation in Mexico. It preserves fossils dating back to the Neogene period, Pliocene epoch.

== Fossil content ==
The following fossils have been reported:

Mammals

- aff. Pontoporia species
- cf. Scaphokogia species
- Stenella species
- Balaenopterinae indeterminate
- Otariinae indeterminate
- Phocoeninae indeterminate
- Kogiidae indeterminate
- Physeteridae indeterminate

Sharks

- Carcharhinus brachylurus
- Carcharhinus galapagensis
- Carcharhinus albimarginatus
- Carcharhinus velox
- Carcharhinus limbatus
- Carcharhinus altimus
- Carcharhinus falciformis
- Carcharhinus obscurus
- Carcharhinus leucas
- Carcharodon carcharias
- Carcharodon sulcidens
- Galeocerdo rosaliaensis
- Hemipristis serra
- Hexanchus griseus
- Isurus benedeni
- Isurus oxyrinchus
- Megalodon
- Odontaspis acutissima
- Prionace glauca
- Rhizoprionodon longurio
- Sphyrna vespertina
- Sphyrna mokarran
- Sphyrna zygaena
- Sphyrna lewini
- Sphyrna media
- Cetorhinus species
- Heterodontus species
- Notorhynchus species
- Squalus species

Bivalves

- Argopecten ventricosus
- Argopecten cf. callidus
- Argopecten mendenhalli
- Chagrepecten dallasi
- Chlamys corteziana
- Chlamys opuntia
- Euvola vogdesi
- Flabellipecten stearnsii
- Flabellipecten refugioensis
- Leopecten bakeri
- Leptopecten latiauratus
- Nodipecten subnodosus
- Patinopecten santarosaliensis
- Patinopecten species

== See also ==
- List of fossiliferous stratigraphic units in Mexico
