= Pliokogia =

Pliokogia Temporal range: Early Pliocene

Scientific classification
- Kingdom: Animalia
- Phylum: Chordata
- Class: Mammalia
- Order: Artiodactyla
- Infraorder: Cetacea
- Family: Kogiidae
- Subfamily: Kogiinae
- Genus: †Pliokogia; Collareta et al., 2019

Type species
- †Pliokogia appenninica Collareta et al., 2019

Extinct species of cetacean

Pliokogia is extinct genus of pygmy sperm whale from the Pliocene period. The fossil is constituted of an incomplete skull found in Northern Italy. The type species is Pliokogia appenninica.
