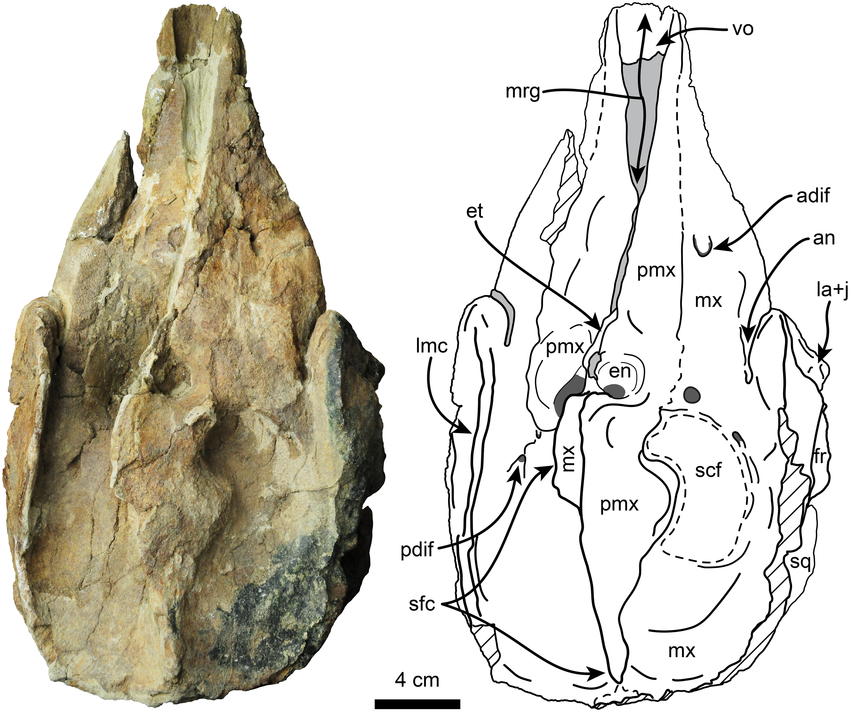
- Dorsal view of holotype skull of Nanokogia isthmia.

Scientific classification
- Kingdom: Animalia
- Phylum: Chordata
- Class: Mammalia
- Order: Artiodactyla
- Infraorder: Cetacea
- Family: Kogiidae
- Genus: †Nanokogia; Velez et al., 2015

Type species
- †Nanokogia isthmia Velez et al., 2015

= Nanokogia =

Nanokogia Temporal range: Late Miocene 11.6–7.2 Ma

Extinct genus of mammals

Nanokogia is an extinct genus of pygmy sperm whale that lived off the coast of Panama during the Late Miocene.

== Description ==
Nanokogia is distinguished from other kogiids in lacking functional teeth in the upper jaw, antorbital notches forming a narrow slit, antorbital notches within the supracranial basin, and the left premaxilla excluded from the sagittal facial crest. The absence of functional teeth is also seen in modern pygmy sperm whales and the extinct genus Scaphokogia.

== Biology ==
Nanokogia relied on suction-feeding to capture squid and diel-migrating fishes, given the absence of functional teeth in the upper jaw.
