= Koristocetus =

Koristocetus Temporal range: Late Miocene

Scientific classification
- Kingdom: Animalia
- Phylum: Chordata
- Class: Mammalia
- Infraclass: Placentalia
- Order: Artiodactyla
- Infraorder: Cetacea
- Family: Kogiidae
- Genus: †Koristocetus
- Species: †K. pescei

Binomial name
- †Koristocetus pescei Collareta et al., 2017

Genus of cetacean

Koristocetus is an extinct genus of kogiid cetacean that lived in what is now Peru during the Late Miocene. It is a monotypic genus that contains the species K. pescei.
