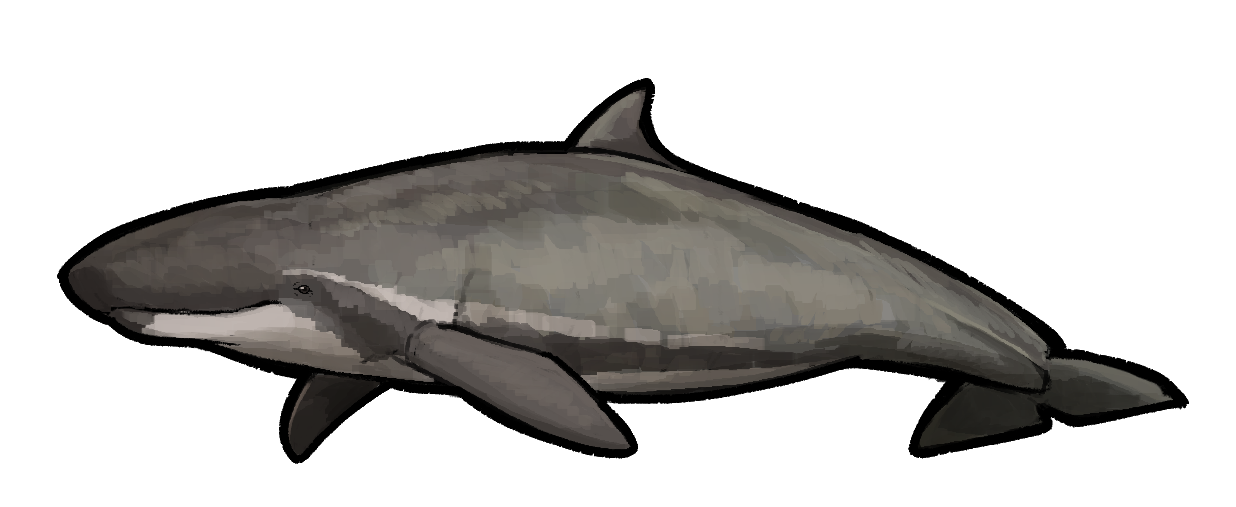
- Life restoration

Scientific classification
- Kingdom: Animalia
- Phylum: Chordata
- Class: Mammalia
- Order: Artiodactyla
- Infraorder: Cetacea
- Family: Kogiidae
- Genus: †Aprixokogia; Whitmore & Kaltenbach, 2008
- Species: †A. kelloggi

Binomial name
- †Aprixokogia kelloggi Whitmore & Kaltenbach, 2008

= Aprixokogia =

Aprixokogia Temporal range: Early Pliocene

Extinct genus of mammals

Aprixokogia is an extinct genus of cetacean in the family Kogiidae that lived during the Pliocene in what is now the Yorktown Formation of North Carolina. It shared its habitat with ancestors of the modern pilot whale and pygmy right whale, as well as sea turtles and Pelagornis.

== Characteristics ==
Aprixokogia skulls, unlike other kogiids, taper distally to a rounded end of the rostrum. The supracranial fossa extends further back along the dorsal line than other fossilized kogiids. The stem Aprixokogia did not include any fossilized periotic bones, which has limited further research on the genus.
