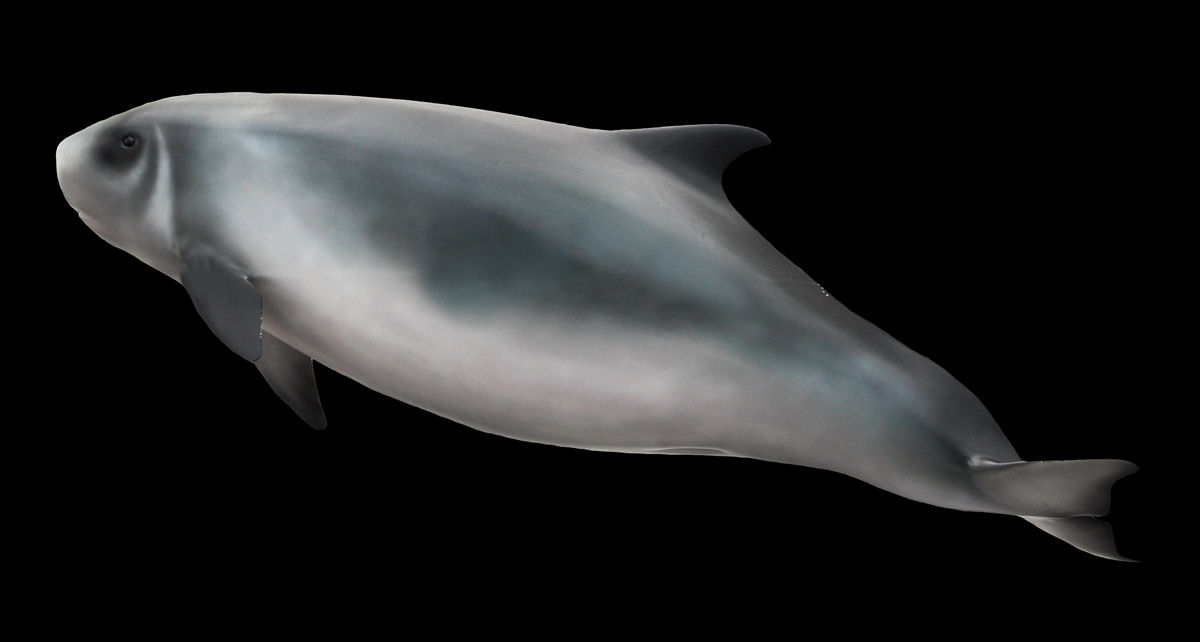
- Dwarf sperm whale, Kogia sima

Scientific classification
- Kingdom: Animalia
- Phylum: Chordata
- Class: Mammalia
- Order: Artiodactyla
- Infraorder: Cetacea
- Family: Kogiidae
- Subfamily: Kogiinae
- Genus: Kogia; J. E. Gray, 1846

Type species
- Physeter breviceps Blainville, 1838

Species
- See text
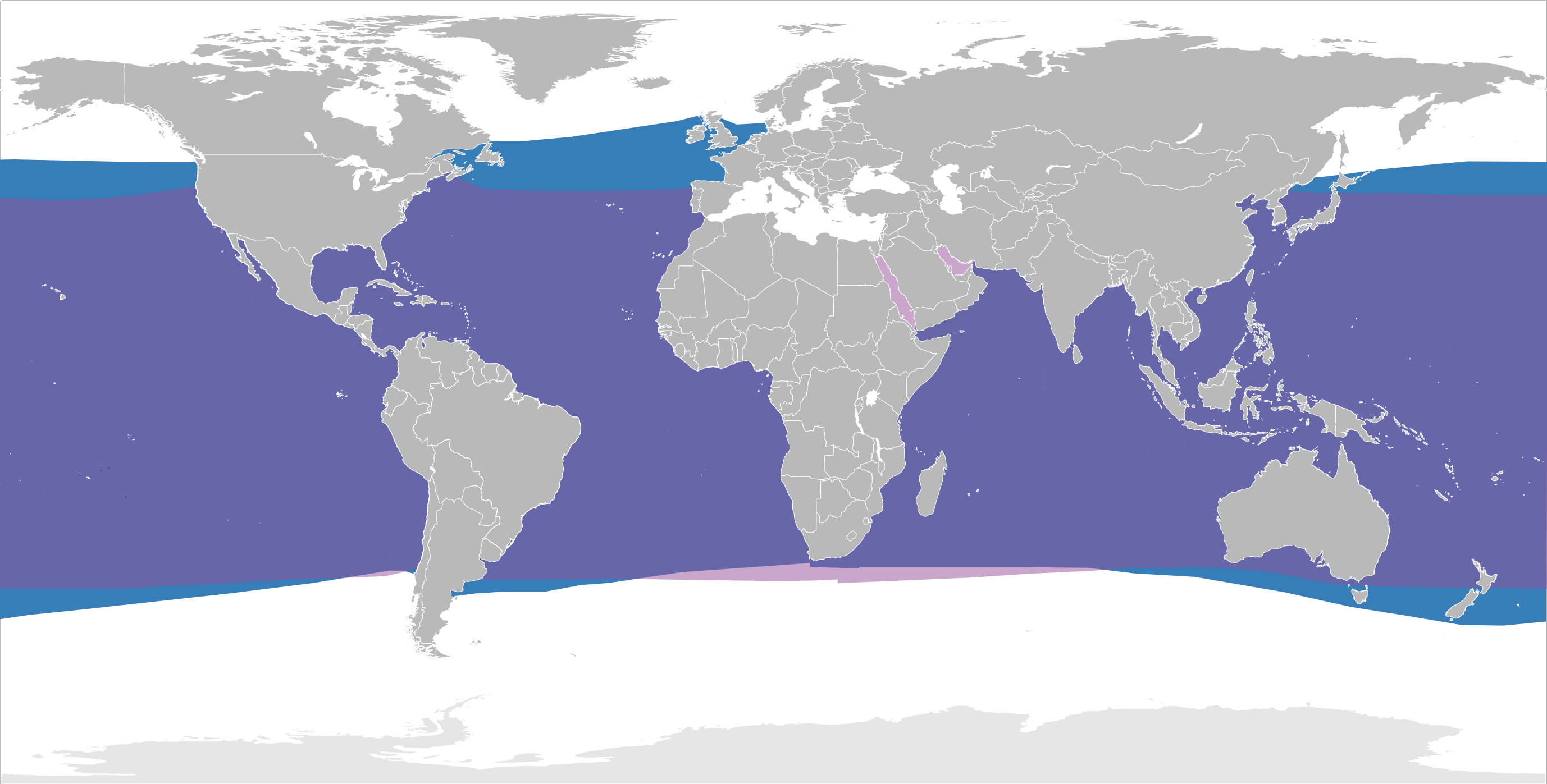
- Kogia distribution K. breviceps in blue, K. sima in pink

= Kogia =

Kogia Temporal range: Neogene (Late Miocene)-Holocene 5.3–0 Ma

Genus of mammals

Kogia is a genus of toothed whales within the superfamily Physeteroidea comprising two extant and two extinct species from the Neogene:

- Pygmy sperm whale, Kogia breviceps
- Dwarf sperm whale, Kogia sima
- †Kogia pusilla, Italy, Middle Pliocene
- †Kogia danomurai Pisco Formation, Peru, latest Miocene
