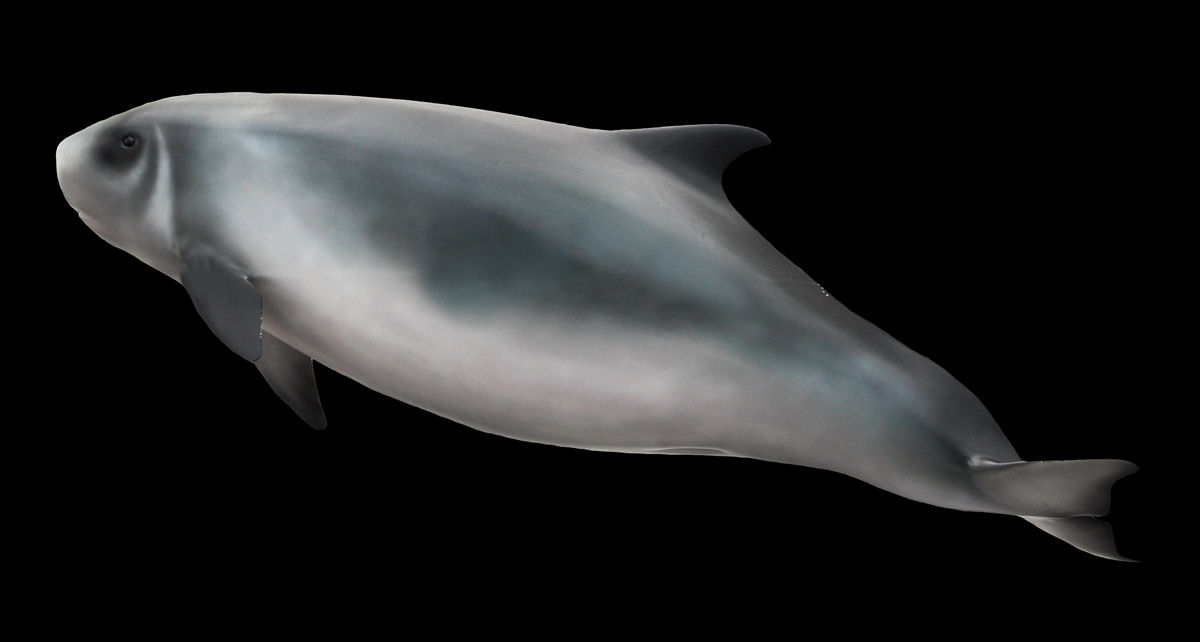
- Dwarf sperm whale, Kogia sima

Scientific classification
- Kingdom: Animalia
- Phylum: Chordata
- Class: Mammalia
- Order: Artiodactyla
- Infraorder: Cetacea
- Superfamily: Physeteroidea
- Family: Kogiidae; Gill, 1871

Genera
- †Aprixokogia; †Kogiopsis; †Koristocetus; Kogia; †Nanokogia; †Pliokogia; †Praekogia; †Scaphokogia; †Thalassocetus
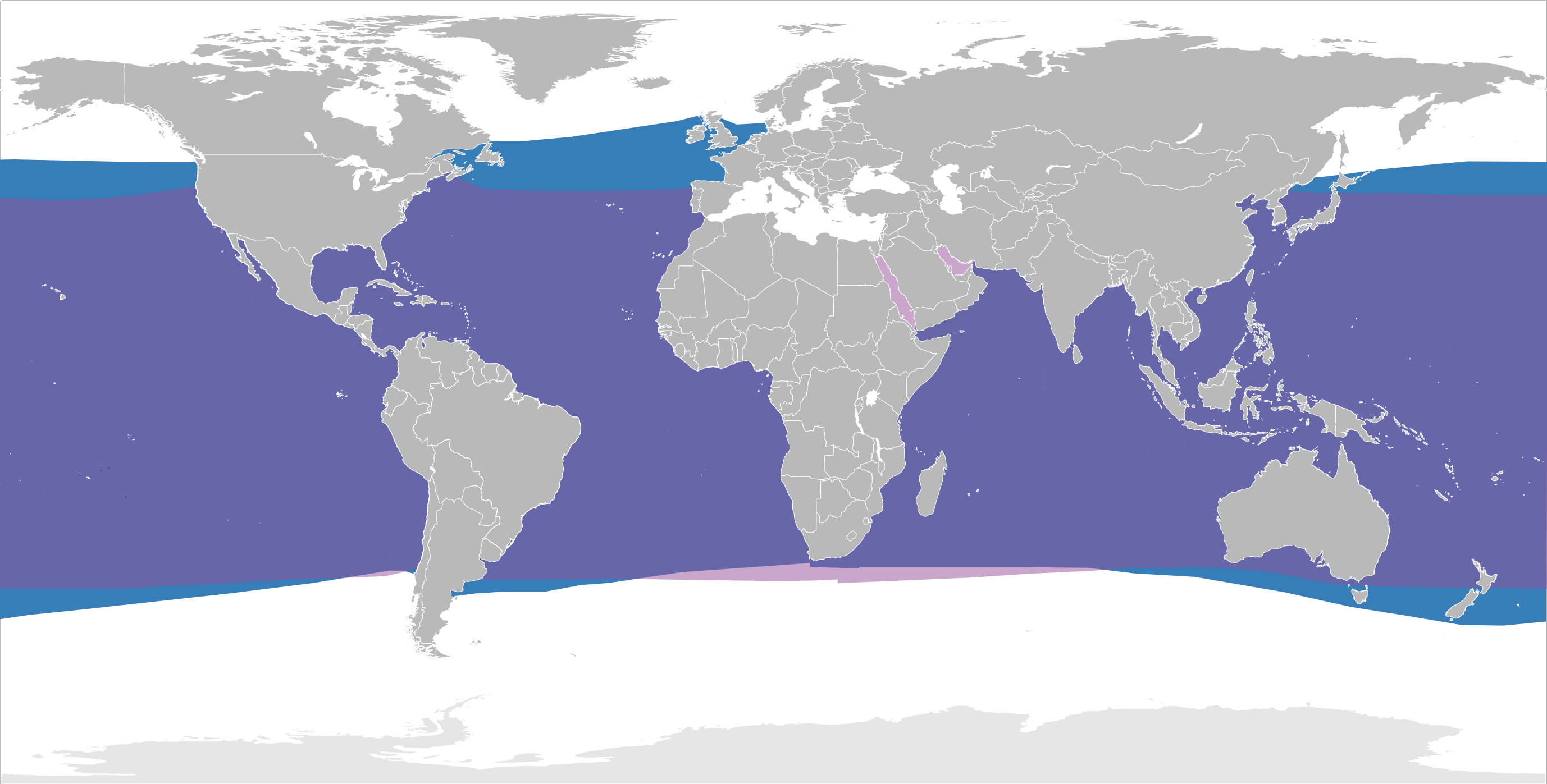
- Distribution of extant Kogiidae; Kogia breviceps in blue, Kogia sima in pink

= Kogiidae =

Kogiidae Temporal range: Miocene – Recent

Family of mammals

Kogiidae is a family comprising at least two extant species of Cetacea, the pygmy (Kogia breviceps) and dwarf (K. sima) sperm whales. As their common names suggest, they somewhat resemble sperm whales, with squared heads and small lower jaws, but are much smaller, with much shorter skulls and more notable dorsal fins than sperm whales. Kogiids are also characterized by a "false gill slit" behind their eyes.

A number of extinct genera have been named.

== Taxonomy ==
There is some amount of uncertainty over if Kogiidae belongs in the sperm whale family. Research still suggests a close relationship between Kogiidae and sperm whales using mitochondrial DNA, which supports Kogiidae as part of the sperm whale family. This relationship is supported by similarities of the anatomical structures in the head, responsible for sound production, in particular the presence of a spermaceti organ. Other phylogenetic research raises further questions over a potential relationship between kogiids and Ziphiidae. Other questions exist regarding the high relatedness in mitochondrial DNA between Platanista and kogiids. Fossil evidence is limited for this family, which potentially limits an understanding of their relationship to other extant cetaceans.

Researchers have proposed that K. sima may represent at least two genetically unique species, and further genetic research is needed to determine the real number of extant species of Kogiidae.

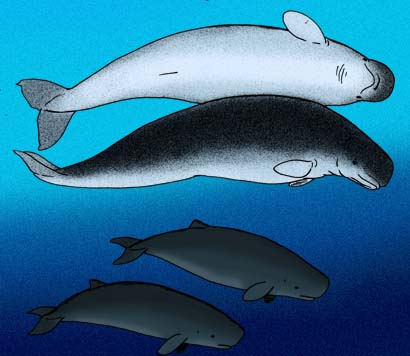
A comparison of an extinct monodont, Denebola brachycephala (top), and an extinct kogiid, Praekogia cedrosensis (bottom), both from the Late Miocene.

ORDER ARTIODACTYLA

- Infraorder Cetacea
  - Parvorder Odontoceti toothed whales
    - Superfamily Physeteroidea
      - Family Kogiidae
        - Genus Kogia
          - Pygmy sperm whale, K. breviceps
          - Dwarf sperm whale, K. sima
          - Kogia pusilla †
          - Kogia danomurai†
        - Genus Aprixokogia †
          - Aprixokogia kelloggi
        - Genus Kogiopsis†
          - Kogiopsis floridana
        - Genus Koristocetus†
        - Genus Nanokogia†
          - Nanokogia isthmia
        - Genus Pliokogia †
          - Pliokogia apenninica
        - Genus Praekogia†
          - Praekogia cedrosensis
        - Genus Scaphokogia†
          - Scaphokogia cochlearis
        - Genus Thalassocetus†
          - Thalassocetus antwerpiensis

== Biology ==
Kogiid skulls are characterized by a very short rostrum, the smallest among extant cetaceans, as well as high levels of asymmetry, which is expected among odontocetes. Kogiid skulls have the most blunt mandible among extant cetaceans as well. Extant kogiidae also show relatively high encephalization quotient, the ratio between observed brain size and expected brain size. The pygmy sperm whale has an EQ of 1.78, while the dwarf sperm whale's EQ is 1.63. Kogiidae do possess spermaceti in their head like sperm whales. However, kogiid spermaceti is unique as the whales are able to control its temperature. Kogiidae are also homodonts, showing teeth all of the same size and shape.

Kogiidae possess a unique system of organs to produce sound, including a bagpipe-like structure to produce sound and an amplifying horn.

Kogiidae have a modified colon which works as an "ink sac", storing liquid red feces. They are able to release over three gallons of this fecal "ink" to confuse or discourage predators.

== Ecology ==
=== Range ===
Kogiidae are believed to be cosmopolitan species, inhabiting all oceans except polar waters, remaining between the 50° latitude lines.

Two fossilized species of Kogia sp. were shown to exhibit sympatry, similar to the two modern members of Kogia, which researchers suggested shows that this behavior has been part of Kogiidae for at least 3 million years.

=== Behavior and feeding ===
Extant kogiids travel in small groups and rarely surface, potentially to avoid predators like orcas.

Kogiidae are deep diving whales, believed to dive up to depths of 500 m. Kogiids feed using a technique known as suction feeding, and their diet primarily consists of squid. Pygmy sperm whales are able to eat larger prey than dwarf sperm whales, although their diet as a whole is relatively similar. They have also been observed using echolocation to find their prey, and their hearing places them in the "Very High Frequency" group of cetaceans that can hear well above 100 kHz.

== Human threats ==
Most observations of Kogia have come from individuals tangled in fishing line or stranded individuals. There is a commercial fishery for K. breviceps in parts of southeast Asia and the Lesser Antilles. Both species of extant Kogia have also been observed stranded with plastics blocking their intestines.
