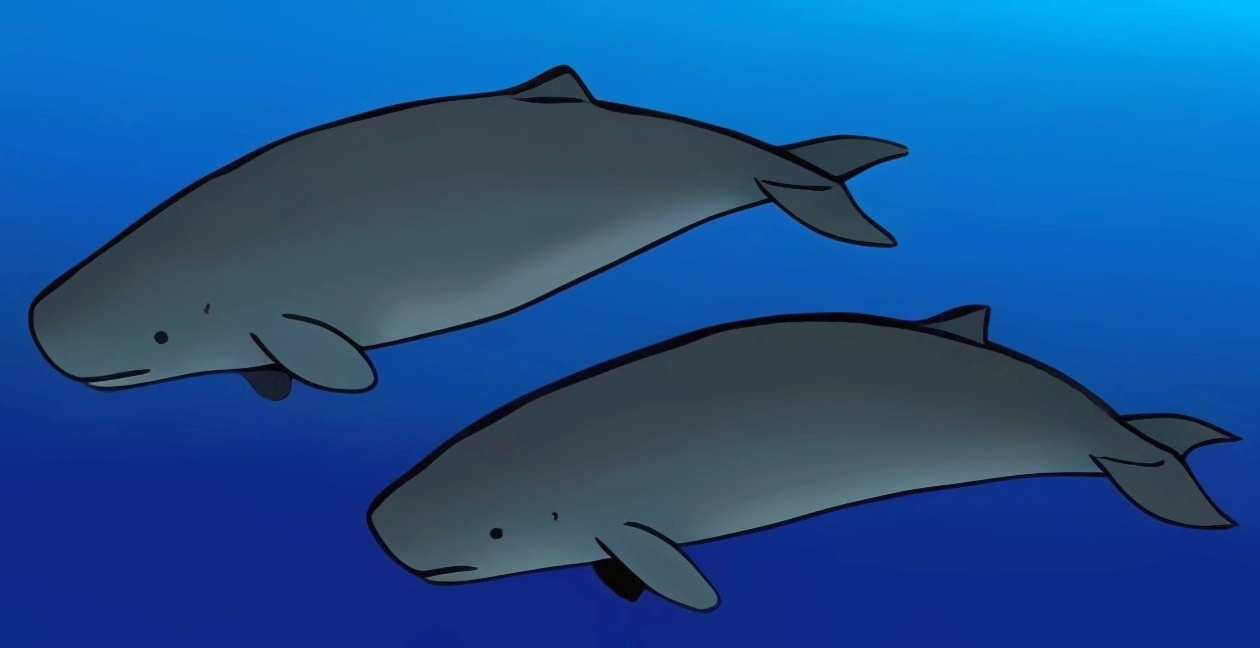
- Reconstruction of Praekogia cedrosensis

Scientific classification
- Domain: Eukaryota
- Kingdom: Animalia
- Phylum: Chordata
- Class: Mammalia
- Order: Artiodactyla
- Infraorder: Cetacea
- Family: Kogiidae
- Genus: †Praekogia; Barnes, 1973
- Species: †P. cedrosensis

Binomial name
- †Praekogia cedrosensis Barnes, 1973

= Praekogia =

Praekogia Temporal range: Late Miocene ~7–5 Ma

Extinct genus of mammals

Praekogia is an extinct genus of cetacean in the family Kogiidae that lived during the Miocene, containing one species: P. cedrosensis. Fossils have been found in Mexico (Baja California).
