= Scaphokogia =

Scaphokogia Temporal range: Late Miocene-Late Pliocene (Huayquerian-Montehermosan & Blancan) ~7.246–2.588 Ma

Scientific classification
- Kingdom: Animalia
- Phylum: Chordata
- Class: Mammalia
- Order: Artiodactyla
- Infraorder: Cetacea
- Family: Kogiidae
- Subfamily: †Scaphokogiinae
- Genus: †Scaphokogia; Muizon 1988

Species
- S. cochlearis Muizon, 1988; S. huachafo Benites-Palomino et al., 2026; S. totajpe Benites-Palomino et al., 2019

Extinct genus of mammals

Scaphokogia is an extinct genus of pygmy sperm whales that lived off the coasts of Mexico and Peru, South America during the Late Miocene to Late Pliocene. Three species have currently been described: the type species S. cochlearis, S. huachafo, and S. totajpe. It is estimated to have reached up to 2.2–2.8 metres (7.2–9.2 ft) in total length. Fossils of Scaphokogia have been found in the Tirabuzon Formation of Baja California and the Pisco Formation of Peru. Scaphokogia existed about 5 million years ago, and were relatively rare animals.

S. huachafo is particularly noteworthy among the three species of this genus due to the extreme asymmetry in its bulbous, downturned skull and its apparent unique benthic feeding habits, which are comparable to another contemporary whale from the area; Odobenocetops. Its unique cranial asymmetry suggests highly refined echolocation for locating prey animals buried in the seabed.

A 2022 study which examined specimens of multiple physeteroids, including specimens assigned to both species of Scaphokogia known at the time, and discovered bite marks consistent with the teeth of either the modern Great White Shark (Carcharodon carcharias) or the extinct Otodontid shark Otodus megalodon, on multiple regions of the skull, suggesting these whales were prey for such large lamniformes.
