= Spermaceti organ =

Part of a sperm whale

Spermaceti organ within a sperm whale.

The spermaceti organ is an organ present in the heads of toothed whales of the superfamily Physeteroidea, in particular the sperm whale. The organ contains a waxy liquid called spermaceti and is thought to be involved in the generation of sound.

== Description ==
In the modern sperm whale (Physeter macrocephalus), this organ is far larger in proportion to the animal's body than can be explained by simple allometry. Its evolution has caused changes in basal skull morphology, implying a trade-off that compromised the functionality of other features. The high investment in this organ suggests that it has some adaptive advantage, although its function is not yet clearly understood.

The spermaceti organ in sperm whales is shaped like an elongated barrel and sits on top of the whale's melon. Historically, spermaceti oil was used in a variety of products – including lamp oils, candles, and lubricants – providing the economic basis for the sperm whaling industry. A sperm whale may contain as much as 1,900 L (420 imp gal; 500 US gal) of oil.

The morphology of the nasal complex is believed to be homologous in all echolocating Odontoceti (toothed whales), with the spermaceti organ homologous to the dorsal bursa in the dolphin. The hypertrophied quality of the sperm whale's nose can be interpreted as an adaptation for deep diving unique to Physeteroidea.

== Hypotheses ==
There are two main hypotheses for the use of the spermaceti organ:

- It assists in controlling buoyancy by manipulating the spermaceti oil temperature and, consequently, its density, facilitating deep diving by cooling and surfacing by warming, and allowing the animal to remain motionless at great depth.
- It aids the whale in echolocation, by functioning as a form of sonar.

The first faces many challenges: the change in density achieved by manipulation of spermaceti oil temperature would have a negligible impact on the animal's overall buoyancy; the anatomical features needed for such heat exchange do not appear to be present; temperature regulation would necessitate high physical exertion while at great depth, which deep-diving animals tend to avoid; sperm whales appear to be highly active during dives, countering the notion that buoyancy manipulation is advantageous to remaining motionless while diving; and evolution of the spermaceti organ with buoyancy as a selective pressure would be difficult and unlikely as the organ would only impact buoyancy once it became extremely large.

The hypothesis that the organ aids echolocation is more widely accepted. Under this hypothesis, it assists foraging during deep dives, manipulating the direction and power of sound waves to enhance prey detection.
