= Eudelphis =

Eudelphis Temporal range: Langhian

Scientific classification
- Kingdom: Animalia
- Phylum: Chordata
- Class: Mammalia
- Order: Artiodactyla
- Infraorder: Cetacea
- Superfamily: Physeteroidea
- Genus: †Eudelphis; Du Bus, 1872
- Species: †E. mortezelensis

Binomial name
- †Eudelphis mortezelensis Du Bus, 1872

Extinct genus of mammals

Eudelphis is an extinct genus of sperm whale belonging to Physeteroidea that lived in the ancient North Sea basin about 16-11 million years ago, during the middle Miocene (Langhian).

== Distribution ==
The holotype of Eudelphis is known from the Langhian-age Berchem Formation of the vicinity of Antwerp, Belgium.

== Taxonomy ==
Eudelphis was once considered a synonym of the genus Scaldicetus, but that genus is now considered of doubtful validity due to the questionably diagnostic value of the holotype tooth, and Lambert (2008) revalidated Eudelphis, classifying it as a basal physeteroid.

== See also ==
- Aulophyseter
- Orycterocetus
