= Hoplocetus =

Hoplocetus Temporal range: Middle Miocene-Early Pleistocene ~16.0–1.8 Ma

Scientific classification
- Kingdom: Animalia
- Phylum: Chordata
- Class: Mammalia
- Order: Artiodactyla
- Infraorder: Cetacea
- Superfamily: Physeteroidea
- Family: †Incertae sedis
- Genus: †Hoplocetus; Gervais, 1852

Species
- H. borgerhoutensis du Bus, 1872; H. crassidens Gervais, 1852 (type); H. curvidens Gervais, 1852; H. obesus Leidy, 1868; H. ritzi Hampe, 2006

Extinct genus of mammals

Hoplocetus is an extinct genus of raptorial cetacean of the sperm whale superfamily, Physeteroidea. Its remains have been found in the Miocene of Belgium, France, Germany and Malta, the Pliocene of Belgium and France, and the Pleistocene of the United Kingdom and South Carolina.

== Dentition ==
The teeth of Hoplocetus are massive (95–150 mm in length; 27–47 in maximum diameter), robust and have a short enamel cap on the crowns. They are somewhat larger than those of modern orcas but considerably smaller than those of macroraptorial sperm whales, such as Zygophyseter, as well as those of Scaldicetus caretti. They display a large degree of abrasion, suggesting a highly predatory niche comparable to that of modern orcas. The genus of the latter, Orcinus, first appears in the middle Pliocene and it may have eventually replaced Hoplocetus.

These teeth features also characterize the other extinct toothed whale genera, Diaphorocetus, Idiorophus and Scaldicetus, sometimes placed with Hoplocetus in the subfamily Hoplocetinae. However, some of these taxa are fragmentary and have been used as wastebasket taxa for non-diagnostic material of stem physeteroids.
