= Kogiopsis =

Kogiopsis Temporal range: Miocene

Scientific classification
- Kingdom: Animalia
- Phylum: Chordata
- Class: Mammalia
- Order: Artiodactyla
- Infraorder: Cetacea
- Family: Kogiidae
- Genus: †Kogiopsis; Kellogg, 1929
- Species: †K. floridana

Binomial name
- †Kogiopsis floridana Kellogg, 1929

Extinct genus of mammals

Kogiopsis is a genus of Middle Miocene cetacean from the family Kogiidae. Kogiopsis had very long teeth, 3–12.7 centimetres (1.2–5.0 in) long, without root. These teeth are found mostly in Florida and South Carolina. In addition to its teeth, Kogiopsis is known primarily from mandibles. The anatomy of the teeth and lower jaws are similar to those of the extinct sperm whale genus, Orycterocetus.
