= Eophyseter =

Eophyseter Temporal range: 3.2-3.0 Ma (Piacenzian)

Scientific classification
- Kingdom: Animalia
- Phylum: Chordata
- Class: Mammalia
- Order: Artiodactyla
- Infraorder: Cetacea
- Family: Physeteridae
- Genus: †Eophyseter; Bisconti et al., 2025

Type species
- †Eophyseter damarcoi Bisconti et al., 2025

Extinct genus of sperm whale from the Pliocene epoch

Eophyseter is a genus of extinct physeterid sperm whale from the Pliocene epoch of Italy. It contains one known species: Eophyseter damarcoi, the remains of which were found in the Sabbie d'Asti Formation in the municipality of Vigliano d'Asti. The holotype specimen, MGPT-PU 13864, is relatively complete, consisting of a partial skeleton including most of the vertebral column, a partial left flipper and sternum, fifteen ribs and one chevron. The generic name derives from the Ancient Greek words for dawn (ήώς) and blower (φυσώ). The specific name honors Piero Damarco, who facilitated the preparation of the holotype specimen.

== Phylogeny ==
Phylogenetic analysis by Michelangelo Bisconti and colleagues recovers Eophyseter within the family Physeteridae, placing it as sister to Idiophyseter and as a close relative to Aulophyseter and the modern sperm whale (Physeter macrocephalus).

== Description ==
=== Vertebral ===
The holotype preserves 36 vertebrae, comprising seven cervical, eleven thoracic, six lumbar, and twelve caudal vertebrae. Bisconti and colleagues (2025) estimated that several lumbar and caudal vertebrae were missing and reconstructed an original vertebral count of approximately 49. Based on comparisons of vertebral proportions with those of living sperm whale, the authors suggested that the elongated vertebral centra of Eophyseter may have permitted greater flexibility of the vertebral column, potentially indicating differences in swimming mechanics compared with the modern sperm whale. However, its precise swimming capabilities remain uncertain.

=== Body size ===
Using four equations derived from measurements taken from extant sperm whales, Bisconti and colleagues estimated the mean skeletal length of Eophyseter at 12.83 m (42.1 ft), and its total body length to have been 15.1 m (50 ft) in life.

However, McClure (2026) subsequently questioned the reliability of this estimate, arguing that the original analysis did not directly incorporate the preserved vertebral column and relied on some incorrectly matched measurements and inaccurate skeletal length data. Through a detailed osteological reassessment, incorporating additional skeletal measurements from extant sperm whales, vertebral centrum lengths, and corrections for missing vertebrae and intervertebral cartilage, McClure revised the estimated total body length of E. damarcoi to approximately 11–12 m (36–39 ft). Despite the reduction in its estimated body length following an osteological reassessment, Eophyseter remains one of the largest known fossil physeteroids.
