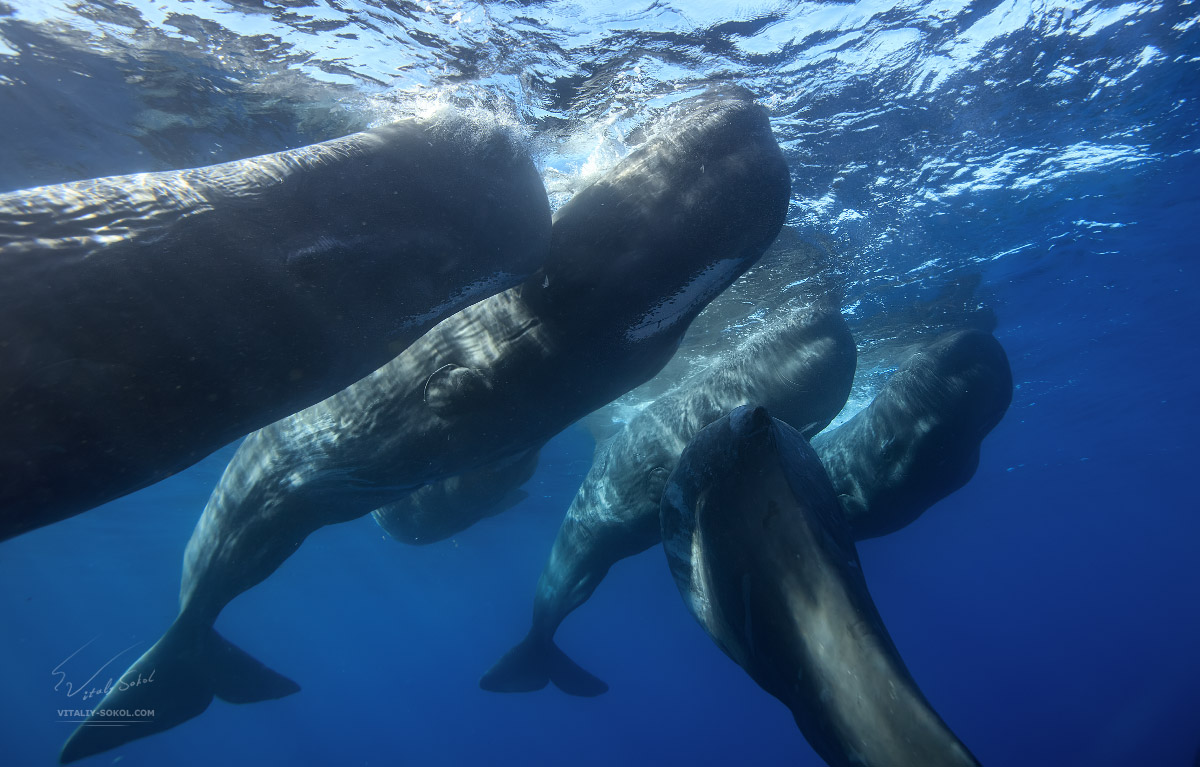
- Social group of the sperm whale, Physeter macrocephalus

Scientific classification
- Kingdom: Animalia
- Phylum: Chordata
- Class: Mammalia
- Order: Artiodactyla
- Infraorder: Cetacea
- Parvorder: Odontoceti
- Superfamily: Physeteroidea; Gray 1868

Families
- Physeteridae; Kogiidae

= Physeteroidea =

Physeteroidea Temporal range: Oligocene to recent 25–0 Ma

Superfamily of toothed whales

Physeteroidea is a superfamily that includes three extant species of whales: the sperm whale, in the genus Physeter, and the pygmy sperm whale and dwarf sperm whale, in the genus Kogia. In the past, these genera have sometimes been united in a single family, the Physeteridae, with the two Kogia species in the subfamily Kogiinae; however, recent practice is to allocate the genus Kogia to its own family, the Kogiidae, leaving the Physeteridae as a monotypic (single extant species) family, although additional fossil representatives of both families are known.

== Characteristics ==
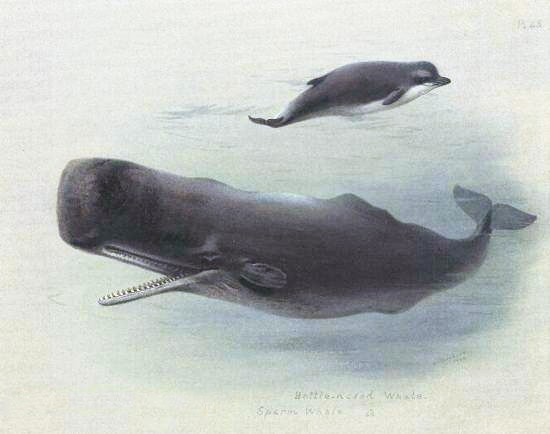
Sperm whale and bottlenose whale

The sperm whale (Physeter macrocephalus) is the largest species of toothed whale, with adult bulls (males) growing to be about 15–18 m (49–59 ft) long, and weighing about 45–70 metric tons (44–69 long tons; 50–77 short tons). The two kogiid species are much smaller, around 2.5 to 3.5 m (8 ft 2 in to 11 ft 6 in) in length, and weighing 350–500 kg (770–1,100 lb).

The bodies of physeteroids are robustly proportioned, with paddle-shaped flippers. The lower jaw is always relatively small and thin relative to the upper jaw. The nasal bones of these whales are distinctly asymmetrical, with the blowhole being located on the left side of the head; in the sperm whale, this is near the top of the head, while on the kogiids it is further forward. All species have a large number of similar, and relatively simple, teeth. In the kogiids, and sometimes also in the sperm whale, the teeth in the upper jaw do not erupt, and are sometimes altogether absent.

The eyes of physeteroids are unable to swivel in their sockets, and possess only a vestigial anterior chamber. Echolocation likely is a far more important sense to these animals than vision.

Another common characteristic is the spermaceti, a semiliquid waxy white substance filling the 'case' or spermaceti organ in the whale's head, which plays a primary role in the production and directional manipulation of focused clicking sounds used for echolocation in the extant great sperm whale (Physeter macrocephalus). All three species dive to great depths to find food, although the sperm whale is believed to dive much deeper than either of the kogiids. Members of both families eat squid, fish, and even sharks.

Gestation lasts from 9 to 15 months, depending on species. The single calf remains with the mother for at least two years, before being weaned. Physeteroids do not reach full sexual maturity for several years. All species congregate in 'pods' or herds, consisting of mostly females, calves, and adolescent males, although these pod sizes are typically smaller in the kogiids.

== Evolution ==
The earliest sperm whale fossils are known from the late Oligocene – about 25 million years ago, with an ancestry tracing back from the latest Eocene before diverging from the remainder of the odontocetid line, leading to the dolphins, and porpoises.

The fossil record suggests that sperm whales were more common in the Miocene, during which basal lineages (such as Zygophyseter and Brygmophyseter) existed; other fossil genera assigned to the Physeteridae include Ferecetotherium, Helvicetus, Idiorophus, Diaphorocetus, Aulophyseter, Orycterocetus, Scaldicetus, and Placoziphius, while kogiid fossil genera include Kogiopsis, Scaphokogia, and Praekogia. The earliest kogiids are known from the late Miocene, around 7 million years ago.

The close relationship between extant Physeteridae and Kogiidae is confirmed in recent molecular studies using mitochondrial cytochrome b,; on the basis of these analyses, their nearest relatives appear to be the Ziphiidae on one hand, and the Mysticeti and Platanistidae on the other. The last cited paper also favours the grouping of Physeteridae and Kogiidae in a single superfamily, Physeteroidea, as has sometimes previously been suggested. Bianucci & Landini, 2006 suggest that Diaphorocetus, Zygophyseter, Naganocetus, and Aulophyseter antedate the inferred split of the Kogiidae and Physeteridae, thus would restrict the family Physeteridae to those genera that postdate this split (a cladistic view).

== Classification ==
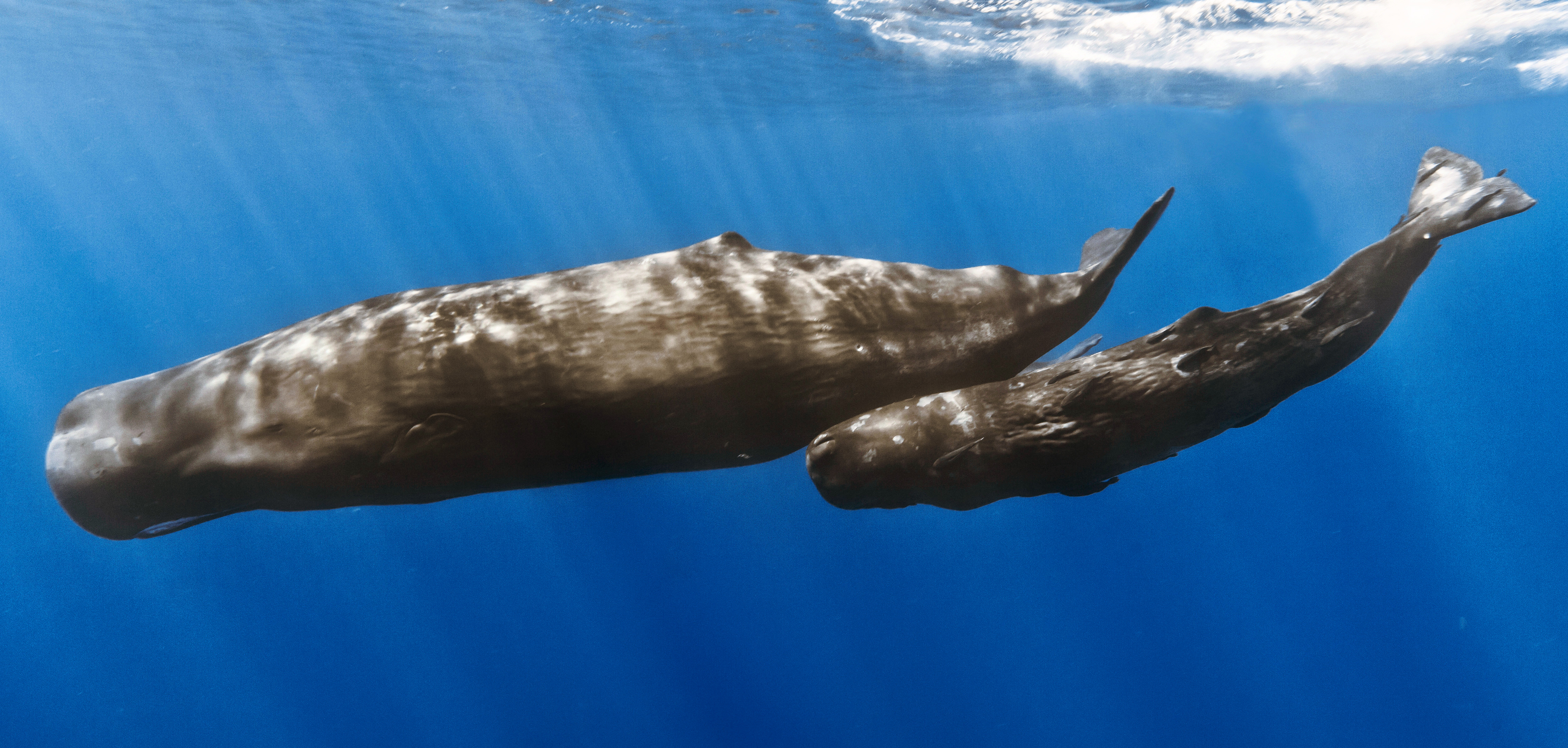
Sperm whale mother with calf

They are members of the Odontoceti, the suborder containing all the toothed whales and dolphins. Suggestions that the sperm whales might be a sister group to the baleen whales were refuted by molecular and morphological data, confirming the monophyly of Odontoceti including sperm whales. One extant species of the genus Physeter is placed in the family Physeteridae. Two species of the related extant genus Kogia, the pygmy sperm whale K. breviceps and the dwarf sperm whale K. simus, are sometimes also placed in this family, or else are placed in their own family, the Kogiidae.

A summary of the classification of extant and extinct (†) taxa is:

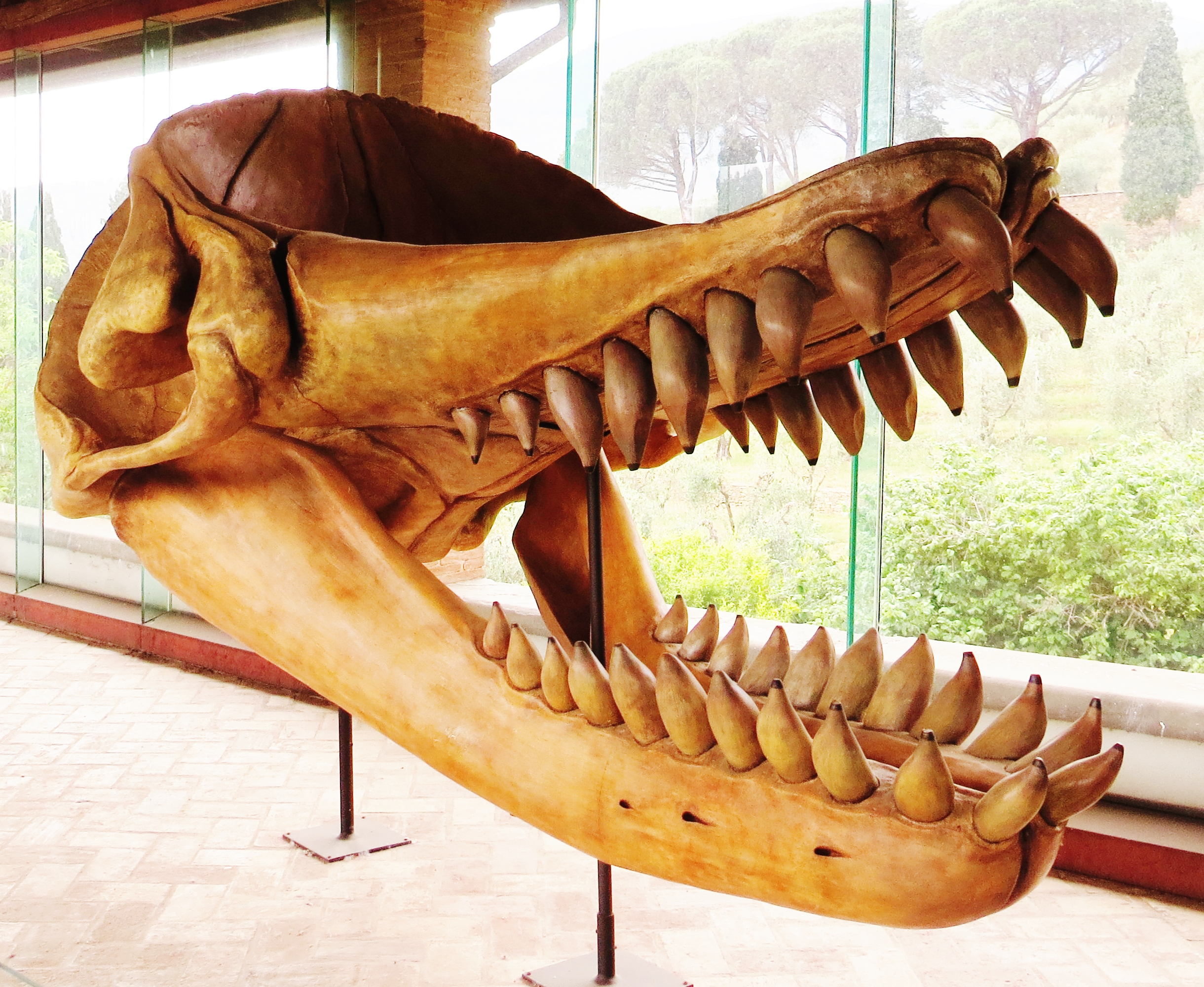
Livyatan melvillei skull

- Physeteroidea, sperm whales
  - Stem physeteroids
    - †Acrophyseter
    - †Albicetus
    - †Angelocetus
    - †Brygmophyseter (= Naganocetus)
    - †Diaphorocetus
    - †Eudelphis
    - †Livyatan
    - †Miophyseter
    - †Orycterocetus
    - †Rhaphicetus
    - †Zygophyseter
  - Physeteridae, sperm whales
    - †Aulophyseter
    - †Cozzuoliphyseter
    - †Ferecetotherium
    - †Helvicetus
    - †Idiophyseter
    - †Idiorophus
    - †Orycterocetus
    - †Eophyseter
    - Physeter, sperm whales
      - Physeter macrocephalus, sperm whale
    - †Physeterula
    - †Placoziphius
    - †Preaulophyseter
    - †Scaldicetus
  - Kogiidae
    - †Aprixokogia
    - Kogia, small sperm whales
      - Kogia breviceps, pygmy sperm whale
      - Kogia sima, dwarf sperm whale
      - †Kogia pusilla
    - †Kogiopsis
    - †Praekogia
    - †Scaphokogia
    - †Thalassocetus

=== Nomina dubia ===
- †Eucetus
- †Graphiodon
- †Homocetus
- †Hoplocetus
- †Orcopsis
- †Palaeodelphis
- †Paleophoca
- †Physetodon
- †Physodon
- †Physotherium
- †Priscophyseter
- †Prophyseter
- †Scaptodon
- †Ziphoides
