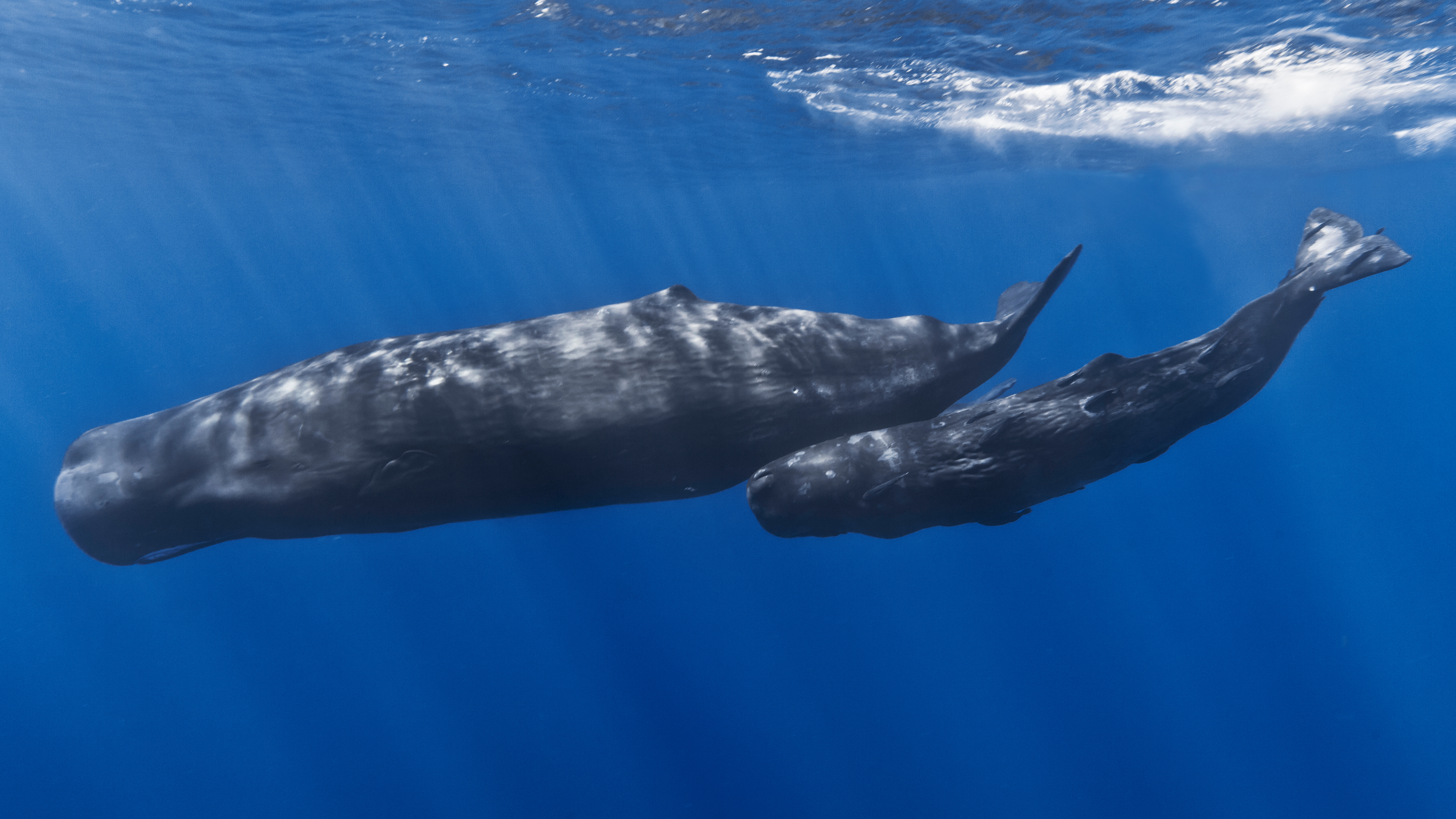

Conservation status
- Vulnerable (IUCN 3.1)
- CITES Appendix I

Scientific classification
- Kingdom: Animalia
- Phylum: Chordata
- Class: Mammalia
- Order: Artiodactyla
- Infraorder: Cetacea
- Family: Physeteridae
- Genus: Physeter
- Species: P. macrocephalus

Binomial name
- Physeter macrocephalus Linnaeus, 1758
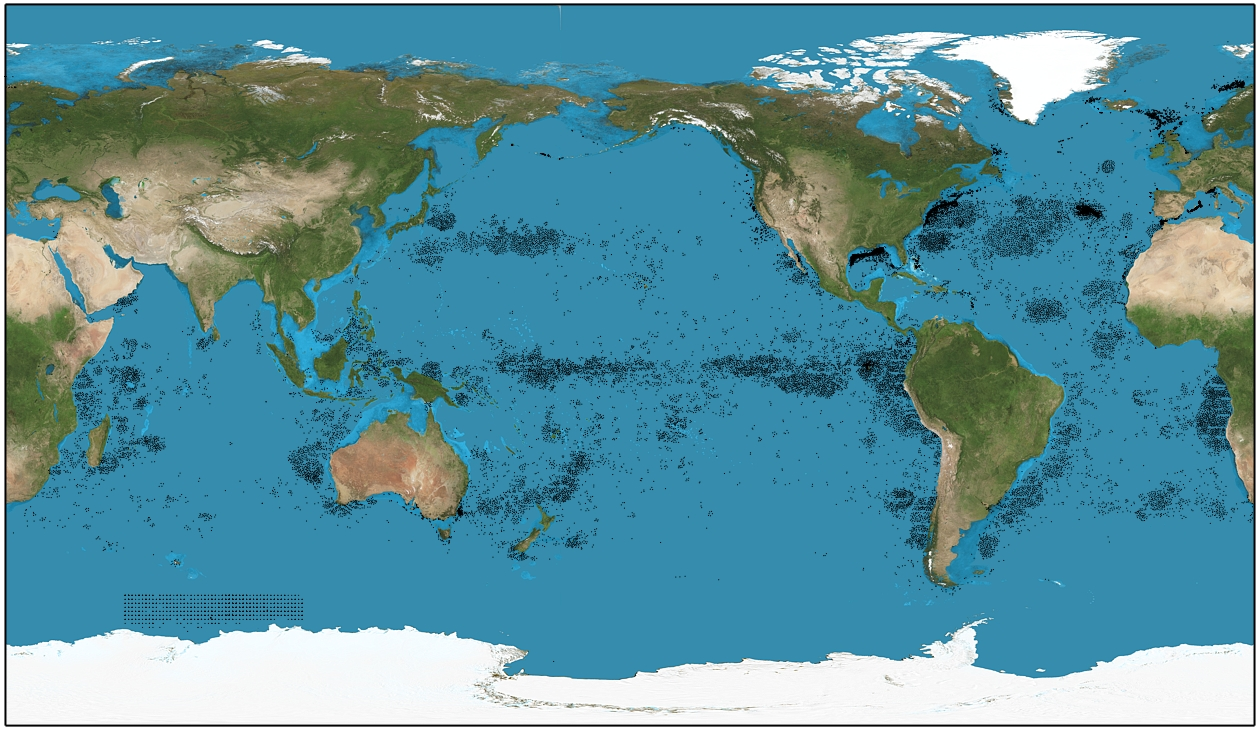
- Major sperm whale grounds

Synonyms
- Physeter catodon Linnaeus, 1758; Physeter microps Linnaeus, 1758; Physeter tursio Linnaeus, 1758; Physeter australasianus Desmoulins, 1822

= Sperm whale =

Sperm whale Temporal range: Pliocene – Recent

Largest species of toothed whale

The sperm whale or cachalot (Note: /ˈkæʃəlɒt, ˈkæʃəloʊ/ – "cachalot". Oxford English Dictionary (online ed.). Oxford University Press. (Subscription or participating institution membership required.)) (Physeter macrocephalus) is the largest of the toothed whales and the largest toothed predator. It is the only living member of the genus Physeter and one of three extant species in the sperm whale superfamily Physeteroidea, along with the pygmy sperm whale and dwarf sperm whale of the genus Kogia.

The sperm whale is a pelagic mammal with a worldwide range, and will migrate seasonally for feeding and breeding. Females and young males live together in groups, while mature males (bulls) live solitary lives outside of the mating season. The females cooperate to protect and nurse their young. Females give birth every four to twenty years and care for the calves for more than a decade. A mature, healthy sperm whale has no natural predators, although calves and weakened adults are sometimes killed by pods of orcas.

Mature males average 16 metres (52 ft) in length, with the head representing up to one-third of the animal's length. Plunging to 2,250 metres (7,380 ft), it is the third deepest diving mammal, exceeded only by the southern elephant seal and Cuvier's beaked whale. The sperm whale uses echolocation and vocalization with source level as loud as 236 decibels (re 1 μPa m) underwater, the loudest of any animal. It has the largest brain on Earth, more than five times heavier than a human's. Sperm whales can live 70 years or more.

Sperm whales' heads are filled with a waxy substance called "spermaceti" (sperm oil), from which the whale derives its name. Spermaceti was a prime target of the whaling industry and was sought after for use in oil lamps, lubricants, and candles. Ambergris, a solid waxy waste product sometimes present in its digestive system, is still highly valued as a fixative in perfumes, among other uses. Beachcombers look out for ambergris as flotsam. Sperm whaling was a major industry in the 19th century, depicted in the novel Moby-Dick. The species is protected by the International Whaling Commission moratorium, and is listed as vulnerable by the International Union for Conservation of Nature.

== Taxonomy and naming ==
=== Etymology ===
The name "sperm whale" is a clipping of "spermaceti whale". Spermaceti, originally mistakenly identified as the whales' semen, is the semi-liquid, waxy substance found within the whale's head. (See "Spermaceti organ and melon" below.)

The sperm whale is also known as the "cachalot", which is thought to derive from the archaic French for 'tooth' or 'big teeth', as preserved for example in the word caishau in the Gascon dialect (a word of either Romance or Basque origin).

The etymological dictionary of Corominas says the origin is uncertain, but it suggests that it comes from the Vulgar Latin cappula 'sword hilts'. The word cachalot came to English via French from Spanish or Portuguese cachalote, perhaps from Galician/Portuguese cachola 'big head'.

The term is retained in the Russian word for the animal, kashalot (кашалот), as well as in many other languages.

The scientific genus name Physeter comes from the Greek physētēr (φυσητήρ), meaning 'blowpipe, blowhole (of a whale)', or – as a pars pro toto – 'whale'.

The specific name macrocephalus is Latinized from the Greek makroképhalos (μακροκέφαλος 'big-headed'), from makros (μακρός) + kephalē (κεφαλή).

Its synonymous specific name catodon means 'down-tooth', from the Greek elements cat(a)- ('below') and odṓn ('tooth'); so named because it has visible teeth only in its lower jaw. (See "Jaws and teeth" below.)

Another synonym australasianus ('Australasian') was applied to sperm whales in the Southern Hemisphere.

=== Taxonomy ===
The sperm whale belongs to the order Cetartiodactyla, the order containing all cetaceans and even-toed ungulates. It is a member of the unranked clade Cetacea, with all the whales, dolphins, and porpoises, and further classified into Odontoceti, containing all the toothed whales and dolphins. It is the sole extant species of its genus, Physeter, in the family Physeteridae. Two species of the related extant genus Kogia, the pygmy sperm whale Kogia breviceps and the dwarf sperm whale K. sima, are placed either in this family or in the family Kogiidae. In some taxonomic schemes the families Kogiidae and Physeteridae are combined as the superfamily Physeteroidea (see the separate entry on the sperm whale family).

Swedish ichthyologist Peter Artedi described it as Physeter catodon in his 1738 work Genera piscium, from the report of a beached specimen in Orkney in 1693 and two beached in the Netherlands in 1598 and 1601. The 1598 specimen was near Berkhey.

The sperm whale is one of the species originally described by Carl Linnaeus in his landmark 1758 10th edition of Systema Naturae. He recognised four species in the genus Physeter. Experts soon realised that just one such species exists, although there has been debate about whether this should be named P. catodon or P. macrocephalus, two of the names used by Linnaeus. Both names are still used, although most recent authors now accept macrocephalus as the valid name, limiting catodon's status to a lesser synonym. Until 1974, the species was generally known as P. catodon. In that year, however, Dutch zoologists Antonius M. Husson and Lipke Holthuis proposed that the correct name should be P. macrocephalus, the second name in the genus Physeter published by Linnaeus concurrently with P. catodon.

This proposition was based on the grounds that the names were synonyms published simultaneously, and, therefore, the ICZN Principle of the First Reviser should apply. In this instance, it led to the choice of P. macrocephalus over P. catodon, a view re-stated in Holthuis, 1987. This has been adopted by most subsequent authors, although Schevill (1986 and 1987) argued that macrocephalus was published with an inaccurate description and that therefore only the species catodon was valid, rendering the principle of "First Reviser" inapplicable. The most recent version of ITIS has altered its usage from P. catodon to P. macrocephalus, following L. B. Holthuis and more recent (2008) discussions with relevant experts. Furthermore, The Taxonomy Committee of the Society for Marine Mammalogy, the largest international association of marine mammal scientists in the world, officially uses Physeter macrocephalus when publishing their definitive list of marine mammal species.

== Biology ==
=== External appearance ===
Average sizes
	Length	Weight
Male	16 metres (52 ft)	45 tonnes (50 short tons)
Female	11 metres (36 ft)	15 tonnes (17 short tons)
Newborn	4 metres (13 ft)	1 tonne (1.1 short tons)

The sperm whale is the largest toothed whale and is among the most sexually dimorphic of all cetaceans. Both sexes are about the same size at birth, but mature males are typically 30% to 50% longer and three times as massive as females.

Newborn sperm whales are usually between 3.5 and 4.5 meters (11 and 15 ft) long. Female sperm whales are sexually mature at 8 to 9 meters (26 to 30 ft) in length, whilst males are sexually mature at 11 to 12 meters (36 to 39 ft). Female sperm whales are physically mature at about 10.6 to 11 meters (35 to 36 ft) in length and generally do not achieve lengths greater than 12 metres (39 ft). The largest female sperm whale measured up to 12.3–12.5 meters (40–41 ft) long, and an individual of such size would have weighed about 17 to 24 tonnes (19 to 26 short tons). Male sperm whales are physically mature at about 15 to 16 meters (49 to 52 ft) in length, and larger males can generally achieve 18 to 19 meters (59 to 62 ft). A male sperm whale measuring 18 meters (59 ft) in length is estimated to have weighed 57 tonnes (56 long tons; 63 short tons). By contrast, the second largest toothed whale (Baird's beaked whale) measures up to 12.8–13 meters (42–43 ft) and weighs up to 14 tonnes (15 short tons).

There are occasional reports of individual sperm whales achieving even greater lengths, with some historical claims reaching or exceeding 80 feet (24 m). One example is the whale that sank the Essex (one of the incidents behind Moby-Dick), which was claimed to be 25.9 metres (85 ft). However, there is disagreement as to the accuracy of some of these claims, which are often considered exaggerations or as being measured along the curves of the body. There are reports of individual females reaching much greater lengths, with a female captured in Trinidad in October 1925 measuring 17.6 metres (58 ft), but this suggests an error in sex determination or length measurement.

An individual measuring 20.7 metres (68 ft) was reported from a Soviet whaling fleet near the Kuril Islands in 1950 and is cited by some authors as the largest accurately measured. It has been estimated to weigh 80 tonnes (79 long tons; 88 short tons). In a review of size variation in marine megafauna, McClain and colleagues noted that the International Whaling Commission's data contained eight individuals larger than 20.7 metres (68 ft). The authors supported a 24-metre (79 ft) male from the South Pacific in 1933 as the largest recorded. However, sizes like these are rare, with 95% of recorded sperm whales below 15.85 metres (52.0 ft).

In 1853, one sperm whale was reported at 62 feet (19 m) in length, with a head measuring 20 feet (6.1 m). Large lower jawbones are held in the British Natural History Museum and the Oxford University Museum of Natural History, measuring 5 metres (16 ft) and 4.7 metres (15 ft), respectively. The blunt, square snout can reach up to 1.5 meters (5 ft) at the tip of the lower jaw.

The average size of sperm whales has decreased over the years, probably due to pressure from whaling. Another view holds that exploitation by overwhaling had virtually no effect on the size of the bull sperm whales, and their size may have actually increased in current times on the basis of density dependent effects. Old males taken at Solander Islands were recorded to be extremely large and unusually rich in blubbers.

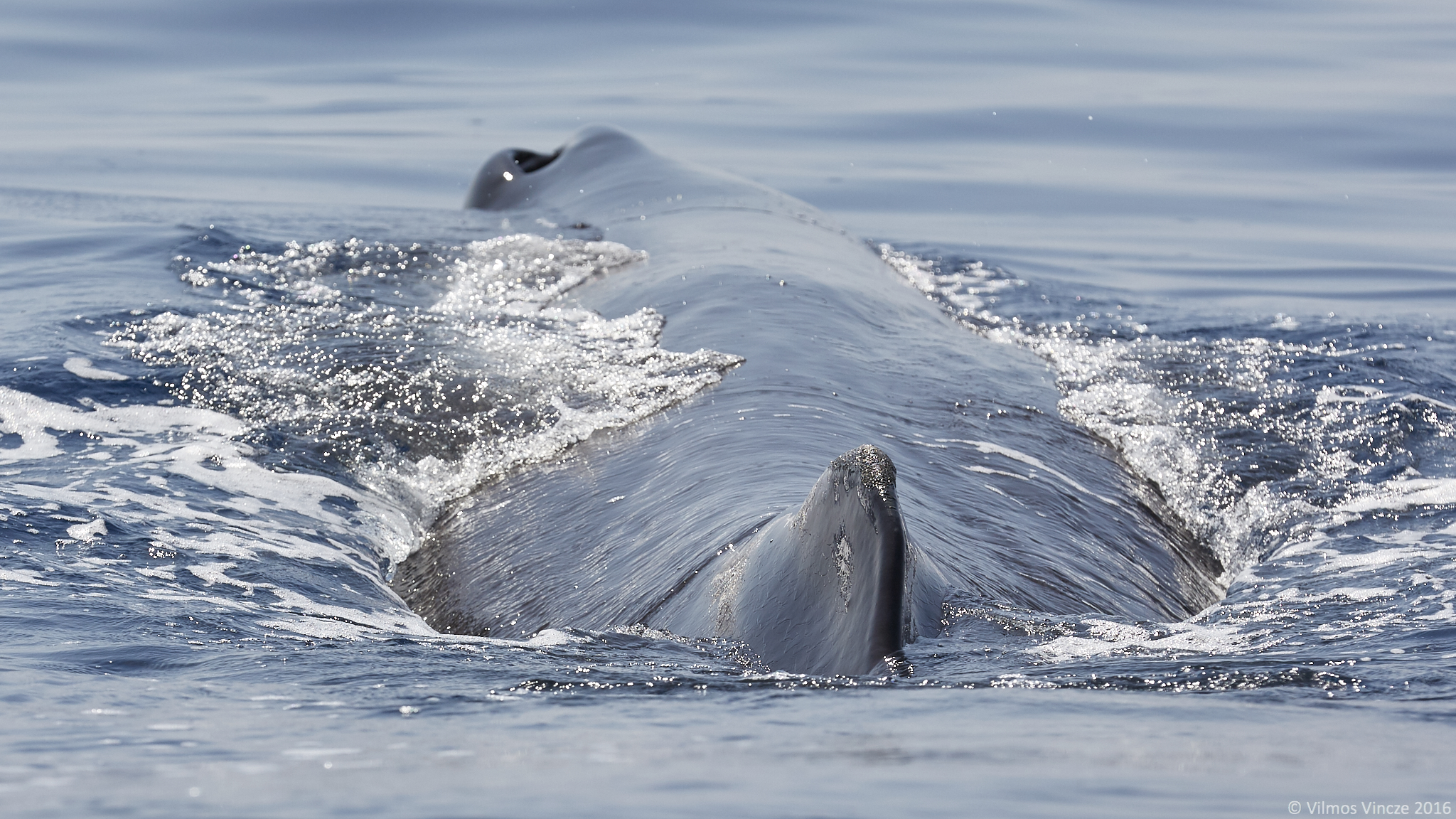
Unusual among cetaceans, the sperm whale's blowhole is highly skewed to the left side of the head.

The sperm whale's unique body is unlikely to be confused with any other species. The sperm whale's distinctive shape comes from its very large, block-shaped head, which can be one-quarter to one-third of the animal's length. The S-shaped blowhole is located very close to the front of the head and shifted to the whale's left. This gives rise to a distinctive bushy, forward-angled spray.

The sperm whale's flukes (tail lobes) are triangular and very thick. Proportionally, they are larger than those of any other cetacean, and are very flexible. The whale lifts its flukes high out of the water as it begins a feeding dive. It has a series of ridges on the back's caudal third instead of a dorsal fin. The largest ridge was called the "hump" by whalers, and can be mistaken for a dorsal fin because of its shape and size.

The male sperm whale, which was stranded in 1997 and is estimated to be 15.2 metres (50 ft) long, weighing 38.5 tonnes (37.9 long tons; 42.4 short tons) and at least 42 years old, has a penis that is 1.56 metres (5.1 ft) long and tapers to about 70 centimetres (28 in) at the tip. The Icelandic Phallological Museum houses a sperm whale penis specimen measuring 1.7 metres (5.6 ft) long and weighing 70 kilograms (154 lb). This specimen is only the tip; the entire organ, if intact, would have been about 5 metres (16 ft) long and weighed about 400 kilograms (880 lb).

In contrast to the smooth skin of most large whales, its back skin is usually wrinkly and has been likened to a prune by whale-watching enthusiasts. Albinos have been reported.

=== Skeleton ===
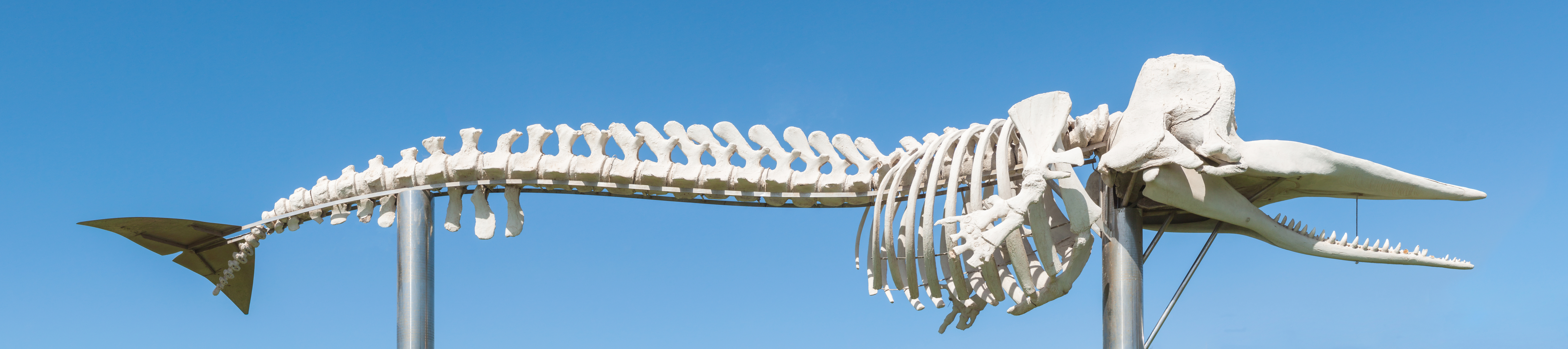
A sperm whale skeleton

The ribs are bound to the spine by flexible cartilage, which allows the ribcage to collapse rather than snap under high pressure. While sperm whales are well adapted to diving, repeated dives to great depths have long-term effects. Bones show the same avascular necrosis that signals decompression sickness in humans. Older skeletons showed the most extensive damage, whereas calves showed no damage. This damage may indicate that sperm whales are susceptible to decompression sickness, and sudden surfacing could be lethal to them.

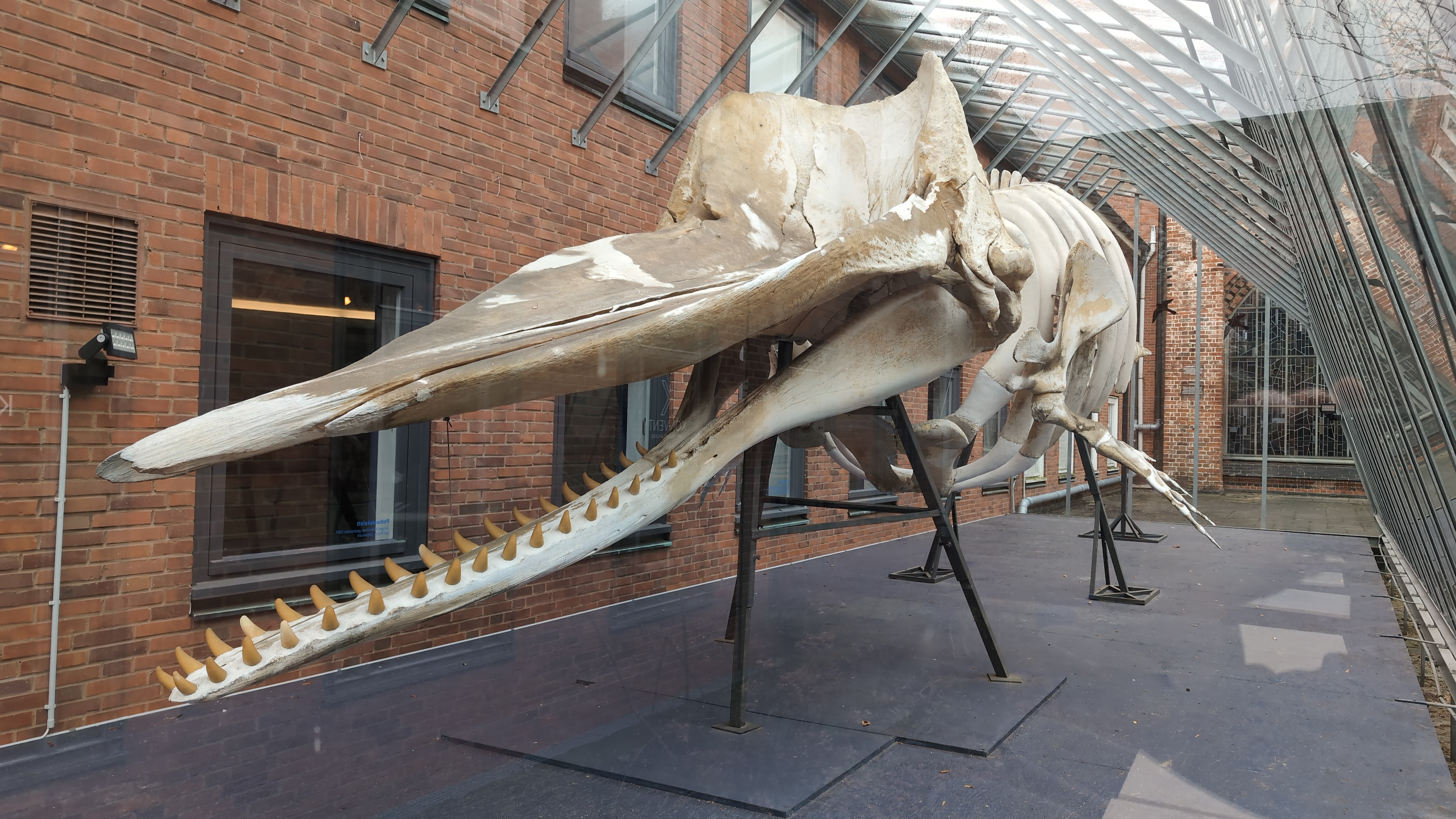
skeleton of a sperm whale, Museum of Nature and Environment, Lübeck Germany

Like that of all cetaceans, the spine of the sperm whale has reduced zygapophysial joints, of which the remnants are modified and are positioned higher on the vertebral dorsal spinous process, hugging it laterally, to prevent extensive lateral bending and facilitate more dorso-ventral bending. These evolutionary modifications make the spine more flexible but weaker than the spines of terrestrial vertebrates.

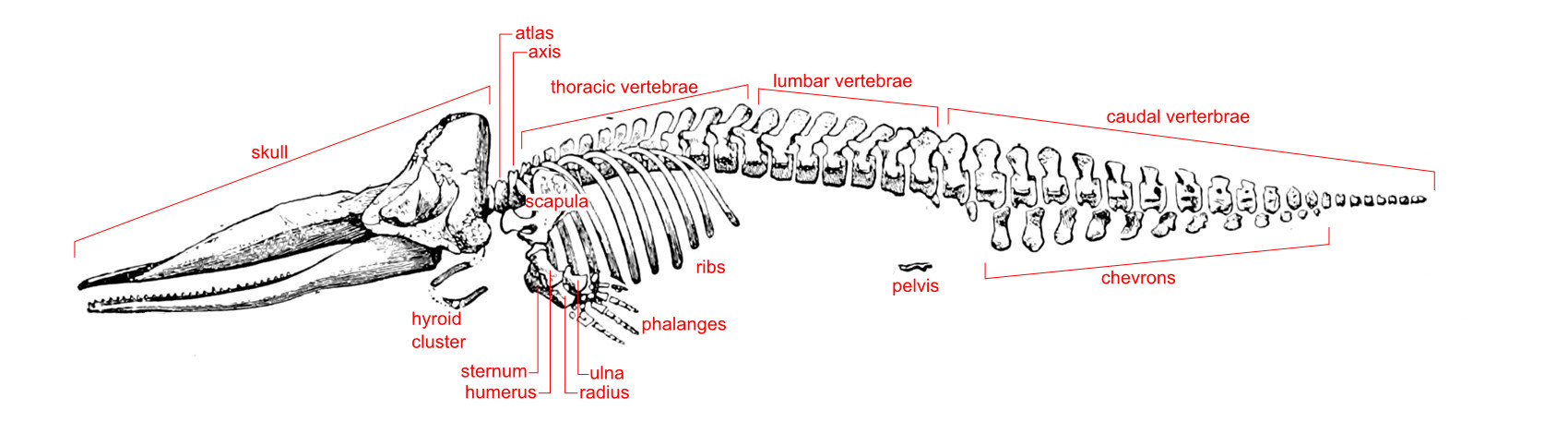
Labeled sperm whale skeleton

Like many cetaceans, the sperm whale has a vestigial pelvis that is not connected to the spine. However, recent research suggests that these bones are actually functional and are targeted by sexual selection to control reproductive muscles.

Like that of other toothed whales, the skull of the sperm whale is asymmetrical so as to aid echolocation. Sound waves that strike the whale from different directions will not be channeled in the same way. Within the basin of the cranium, the openings of the bony narial tubes (from which the nasal passages spring) are skewed towards the left side of the skull.

=== Jaws and teeth ===
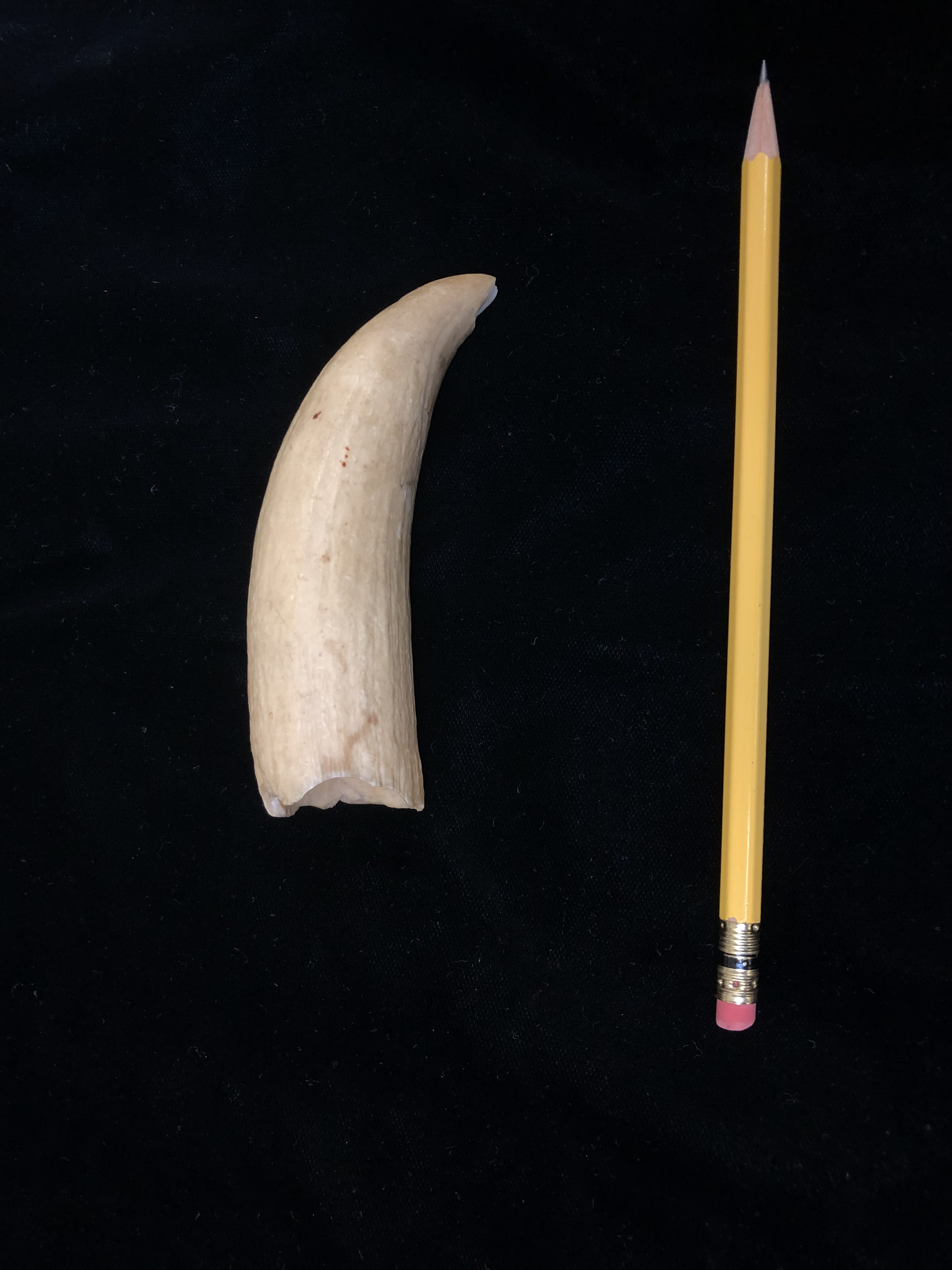
Sperm whale tooth

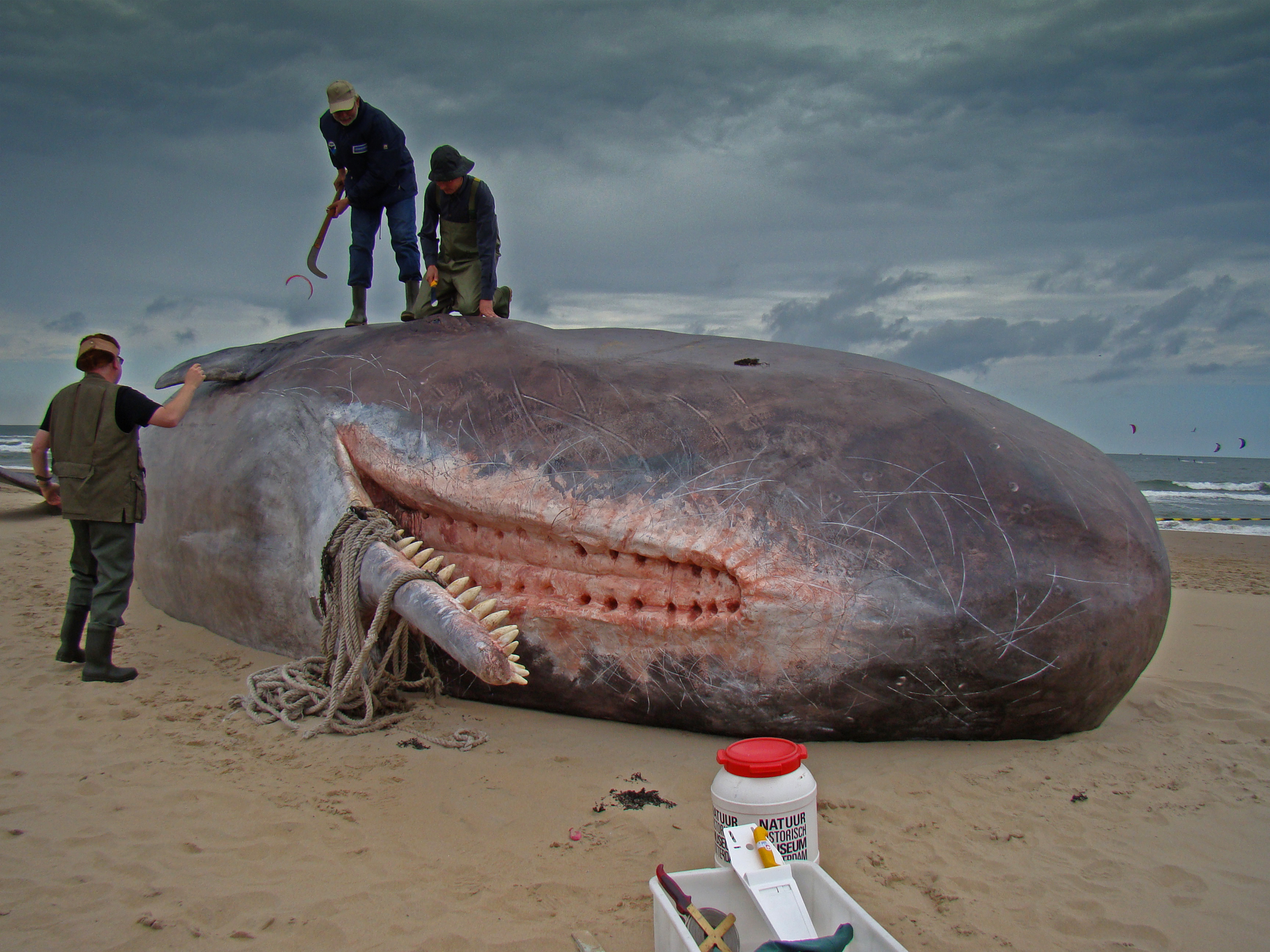
The lower jaw is long and narrow. The teeth fit into sockets along the upper jaw. (lifelike sculpture)

The sperm whale's lower jaw is very narrow and underslung. The sperm whale has 18 to 26 teeth on each side of its lower jaw which fit into sockets in the upper jaw. The teeth are cone-shaped and weigh up to 1 kilogram (2.2 lb) each. The teeth are functional, but do not appear to be necessary for capturing or eating squid, as well-fed animals have been found without teeth or even with deformed jaws. One hypothesis is that the teeth are used in aggression between males. Mature males often show scars which seem to be caused by the teeth. Rudimentary teeth are also present in the upper jaw, but these rarely emerge into the mouth. Analyzing the teeth is the preferred method for determining a whale's age. Like tree rings, the teeth build distinct layers of cementum and dentine as they grow.

=== Brain ===
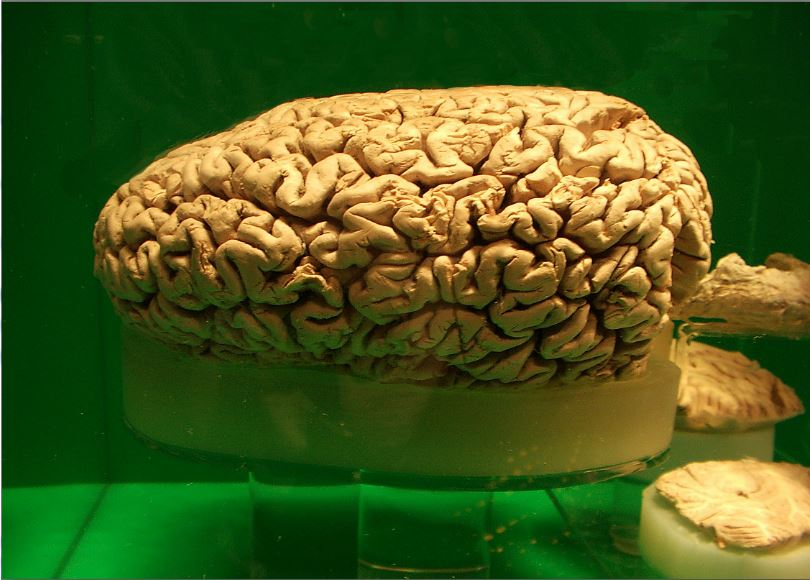
The sperm whale's brain is the largest in the world, five times heavier than a human brain.

The sperm whale brain is the largest known of any modern or extinct animal, weighing on average about 7.08 kilograms (15.6 lb) (with the smallest known weighing 6.4 kilograms (14 lb) and the largest known weighing 9.2 kilograms (20 lb)), more than five times heavier than a human brain, and has a volume of about 8,000 cm^{3}. Although larger brains generally correlate with higher intelligence, it is not the only factor. Elephants and dolphins also have brains which are larger than those of humans. The sperm whale has a lower encephalization quotient than many other whale and dolphin species, lower than that of non-human anthropoid apes, and much lower than that of humans.

The sperm whale's cerebrum is the largest in all mammalia, both in absolute and relative terms. The olfactory system is reduced, suggesting that the sperm whale has a poor sense of taste and smell. By contrast, the auditory system is enlarged. The pyramidal tract is poorly developed, reflecting the reduction of its limbs.

=== Biological systems ===
The sperm whale respiratory system has adapted to cope with drastic pressure changes when diving. The flexible ribcage allows lung collapse, reducing nitrogen intake, and metabolism can decrease to conserve oxygen. Between dives, the sperm whale surfaces to breathe for about eight minutes before diving again. Odontoceti (toothed whales) breathe air at the surface through a single, S-shaped blowhole, which is extremely skewed to the left. Sperm whales spout (breathe) 3–5 times per minute at rest, increasing to 6–7 times per minute after a dive. The blow is a noisy, single stream that rises up to 2 metres (6.6 ft) or more above the surface and points forward and left at a 45° angle. On average, females and juveniles blow every 12.5 seconds before dives, while large males blow every 17.5 seconds before dives. Sperm whales can swim at speeds of up to 7.0–9.6 meters per second (25–35 km/h; 16–21 mph). A sperm whale killed 160 km (100 mi) south of Durban, South Africa, after a 1-hour, 50-minute dive was found with two dogfish (Scymnodon sp.), usually found at the sea floor, in its belly.

The sperm whale has the longest intestinal system in the world, exceeding 300 m (980 ft) in larger specimens. It is estimated that a sperm whale, which is 17 meters (55 ft) long, has an intestine approximately 152 metres (500 ft) long, and it is believed that this intestine would have stretched up to 365 metres (1,200 ft) after the whale's death. The sperm whale has a multi-chambered stomach that is similar to ruminants'. The first chamber secretes no gastric juices and has very thick muscular walls to crush the food (since whales cannot chew) and resist the claw and sucker attacks of swallowed squid. The second chamber is larger and is where digestion takes place. Undigested squid beaks accumulate in the second chamber – as many as 18,000 have been found in some dissected specimens. Most squid beaks are vomited by the whale, but some occasionally make it to the hindgut. Such beaks precipitate the formation of ambergris.

The arterial system of a sperm whale foetus

In 1959, the heart of a 22 metric-ton (24 short-ton) male taken by whalers was measured to be 116 kilograms (256 lb), about 0.5% of its total mass. The circulatory system has a number of specific adaptations for the aquatic environment. The diameter of the aortic arch increases as it leaves the heart. This bulbous expansion acts as a windkessel, ensuring a steady blood flow as the heart rate slows during diving. The arteries that leave the aortic arch are positioned symmetrically. There is no costocervical artery. There is no direct connection between the internal carotid artery and the vessels of the brain. Their circulatory system has adapted to dive at great depths, as much as 2,250 metres (7,382 ft) for up to 120 minutes. More typical dives are around 400 metres (1,310 ft) and 35 minutes in duration. Myoglobin, which stores oxygen in muscle tissue, is much more abundant than in terrestrial animals. The blood has a high density of red blood cells, which contain oxygen-carrying haemoglobin. The oxygenated blood can be directed towards only the brain and other essential organs when oxygen levels deplete. The spermaceti organ may also play a role by adjusting buoyancy (see below). The arterial retia mirabilia are more extensive and larger than those of any other cetacean.

=== Senses ===
==== Spermaceti organ and melon ====
Anatomy of the sperm whale's head. The organs above the jaw are devoted to sound generation.

Atop the whale's skull is positioned a large complex of organs filled with a liquid mixture of fats and waxes called spermaceti. The purpose of this complex is to generate powerful and focused clicking sounds, the existence of which was proven by Valentine Worthington and William Schevill when a recording was produced on a research vessel in May 1959. The sperm whale uses these sounds for echolocation and communication.

The spermaceti organ is like a large barrel of spermaceti. Its surrounding wall, known as the case, is extremely tough and fibrous. The case can hold within it up to 1,900 litres of spermaceti. It is proportionately larger in males. This oil is a mixture of triglycerides and wax esters. It has been suggested that it is homologous to the dorsal bursa organ found in dolphins. The proportion of wax esters in the spermaceti organ increases with the age of the whale: 38–51% in calves, 58–87% in adult females, and 71–94% in adult males. The spermaceti at the core of the organ has a higher wax content than the outer areas. The speed of sound in spermaceti is 2,684 m/s (at 40 kHz, 36 °C), making it nearly twice as fast as in the oil in a dolphin's melon.

Below the spermaceti organ lies the "junk" which consists of compartments of spermaceti separated by cartilage. It is analogous to the melon found in other toothed whales. The structure of the junk redistributes physical stress across the skull and may have evolved to protect the head during ramming.

Running through the head are two air passages. The left passage runs alongside the spermaceti organ and goes directly to the blowhole, whilst the right passage runs underneath the spermaceti organ and passes air through a pair of phonic lips and into the distal sac at the very front of the nose. The distal sac is connected to the blowhole and the terminus of the left passage. When the whale is submerged, it can close the blowhole, and air that passes through the phonic lips can circulate back to the lungs. The sperm whale, unlike other odontocetes, has only one pair of phonic lips, whereas all other toothed whales have two, and it is located at the front of the nose instead of behind the melon.

At the posterior end of this spermaceti complex is the frontal sac, which covers the concave surface of the cranium. The posterior wall of the frontal sac is covered with fluid-filled knobs, which are about 4–13 mm in diameter and separated by narrow grooves. The anterior wall is smooth. The knobbly surface reflects sound waves that come through the spermaceti organ from the phonic lips. The grooves between the knobs trap a film of air that is consistent whatever the orientation or depth of the whale, making it an excellent sound mirror.

The spermaceti organs may also help adjust the whale's buoyancy. It is hypothesized that before the whale dives, cold water enters the organ, and it is likely that the blood vessels constrict, reducing blood flow, and, hence, temperature. The wax therefore solidifies and reduces in volume. The increase in specific density generates a down force of about 392 newtons (88 lb_{f}) and allows the whale to dive with less effort. During the hunt, oxygen consumption, together with blood vessel dilation, produces heat and melts the spermaceti, increasing its buoyancy and enabling easy surfacing. However, more recent work has found many problems with this theory including the lack of anatomical structures for the actual heat exchange. Another issue is that if the spermaceti does indeed cool and solidify, it would affect the whale's echolocation ability just when it needs it to hunt in the depths.

Herman Melville's fictional story Moby-Dick suggests that the "case" containing the spermaceti serves as a battering ram for use in fights between males. A few famous instances include the well-documented sinking of the ships Essex and Ann Alexander by attackers estimated to weigh only one-fifth as much as the ships. However, the hypothesis that the enlarged head of male sperm whales primarily functions as a weapon in intra-sex competition has been subject to significant criticism, and the rarity of records of head-butting fights between males raises questions about whether such behavior is sufficiently typical to drive strong sexual selection.

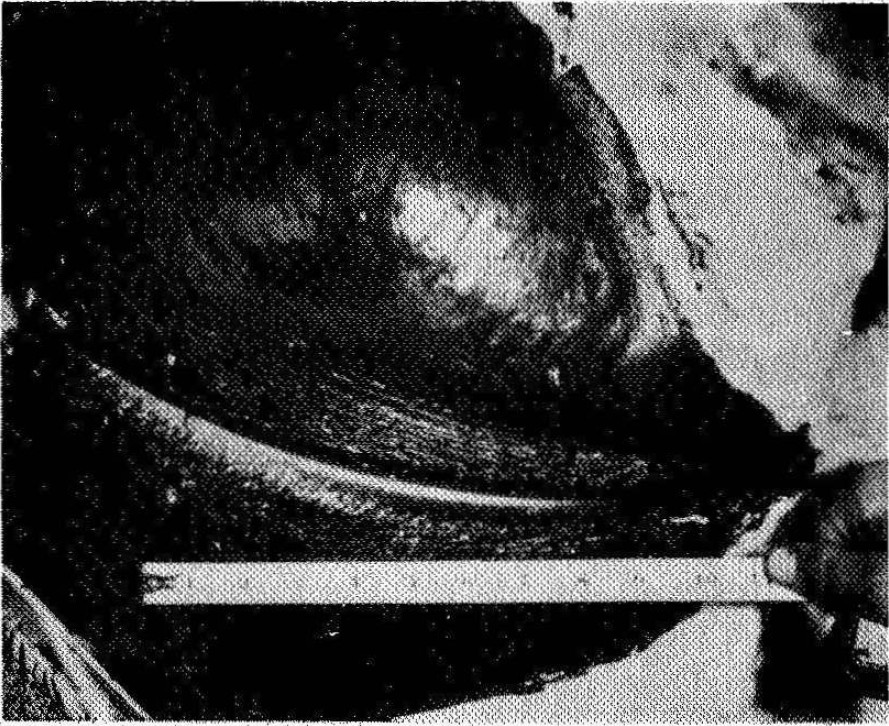
The phonic lips.

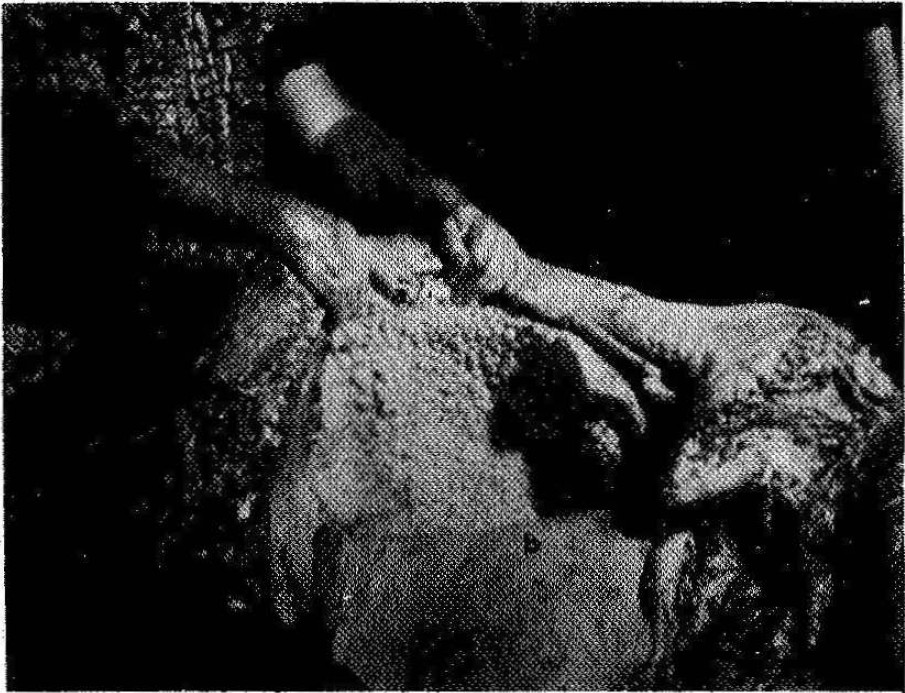
The frontal sac, exposed. Its surface is covered with fluid-filled knobs.

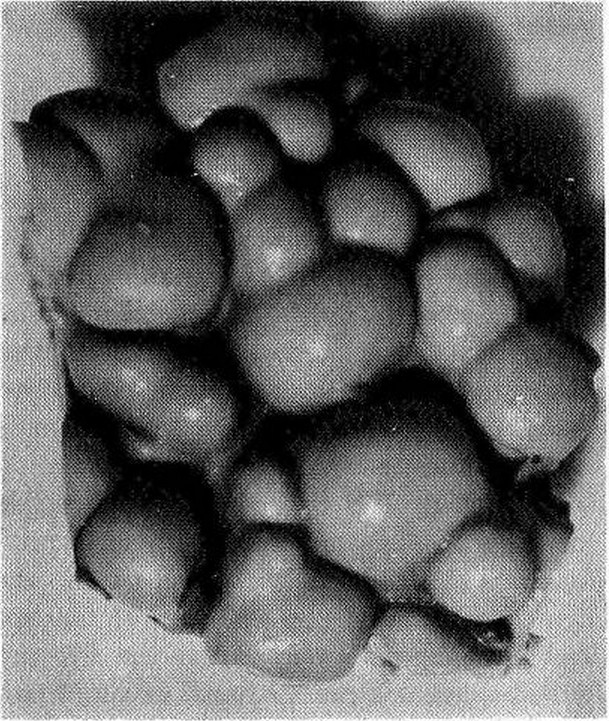
A piece of the posterior wall of the frontal sac. The grooves between the knobs trap a consistent film of air, making it an excellent sound mirror.

==== Eyes and vision ====
Like other toothed whales, the sperm whale can retract its eyes.

The sperm whale's eye does not differ greatly from those of other toothed whales except in size. It is the largest among the toothed whales, weighing about 170 g. It is overall ellipsoid in shape, compressed along the visual axis, measuring about 7×7×3 cm. The cornea is elliptical and the lens is spherical. The sclera is very hard and thick, roughly 1 cm anteriorly and 3 cm posteriorly. There are no ciliary muscles. The choroid is very thick and contains a fibrous tapetum lucidum. Like other toothed whales, the sperm whale can retract and protrude its eyes, thanks to a 2-cm-thick retractor muscle attached around the eye at the equator, but are unable to roll the eyes in their sockets.

According to Fristrup and Harbison (2002), sperm whale's eyes afford good vision and sensitivity to light. They conjectured that sperm whales use vision to hunt squid, either by detecting silhouettes from below or by detecting bioluminescence. If sperm whales detect silhouettes, Fristrup and Harbison suggested that they hunt upside down, allowing them to use the forward parts of the ventral visual fields for binocular vision.

=== Sleeping ===
For some time researchers have been aware that pods of sperm whales may sleep for short periods, assuming a vertical position with their heads just below or at the surface, or head down. A 2008 study published in Current Biology recorded evidence that whales may sleep with both sides of the brain. It appears that some whales may fall into a deep sleep for about 7 percent of the time, most often between 6 p.m. and midnight.

=== Genetics ===
Sperm whales have 21 pairs of chromosomes (2n=42). The genome of live whales can be examined by recovering shed skin.

== Vocalization complex ==
Sperm whale vocalization

After Valentine Worthington and William E. Schevill confirmed the existence of sperm whale vocalization, further studies found that sperm whales are capable of emitting sounds at a source level of 236 decibels – making the sperm whale the loudest animal in the world.

=== Mechanism ===
When echolocating, the sperm whale emits a directionally focused beam of broadband clicks. Clicks are generated by forcing air through a pair of phonic lips (also known as "monkey lips" or "museau de singe") at the front end of the nose, just below the blowhole. The sound then travels backwards along the length of the nose through the spermaceti organ. Most of the sound energy is then reflected off the frontal sac at the cranium and into the melon, whose lens-like structure focuses it. Some of the sound will reflect back into the spermaceti organ and back towards the front of the whale's nose, where it will be reflected through the spermaceti organ a third time. This back and forth reflection which happens on the scale of a few milliseconds creates a multi-pulse click structure.

This multi-pulse click structure allows researchers to measure the whale's spermaceti organ using only the sound of its clicks. Because the interval between pulses of a sperm whale's click is related to the length of the sound producing organ, an individual whale's click is unique to that individual. However, if the whale matures and the size of the spermaceti organ increases, the tone of the whale's click will also change. The lower jaw is the primary reception path for the echoes. A continuous fat-filled canal transmits received sounds to the inner ear.

The source of the air forced through the phonic lips is the right nasal passage. While the left nasal passage opens to the blow hole, the right nasal passage has evolved to supply air to the phonic lips. It is thought that the nostrils of the land-based ancestor of the sperm whale migrated through evolution to their current functions, the left nostril becoming the blowhole and the right nostril becoming the phonic lips.

Air that passes through the phonic lips passes into the distal sac, then back down through the left nasal passage. This recycling of air allows the whale to continuously generate clicks for as long as it is submerged.

=== Vocalization types ===
The sperm whale's vocalizations are all based on clicking, described in four types: the usual echolocation, creaks, codas, and slow clicks.

The usual echolocation click type is used in searching for prey. A creak is a rapid series of high-frequency clicks that sounds somewhat like a creaky door hinge. It is typically used when homing in on prey.

Slow clicks are heard only in the presence of males (it is not certain whether females occasionally make them). Males make a lot of slow clicks in breeding grounds (74% of the time), both near the surface and at depth, which suggests they are primarily mating signals. Outside breeding grounds, slow clicks are rarely heard, and usually near the surface.

Characteristics of sperm whale clicks
Click type	Apparent source level (dB re 1 μPa m)	Directionality	Centroid frequency (kHz)	Inter-click interval (s)	Duration of click (ms)	Duration of pulse (ms)	Range audible to sperm whale (km)	Inferred function	Audio sample
Usual	230	High	15	0.5–1.0	15–30	0.1	16	Searching for prey	
Creak	205	High	15	0.005–0.1	0.1–5	0.1	6	Homing in on prey	
Coda	180	Low	5	0.1–0.5	35	0.5	~2	Social communication	
Slow	190	Low	0.5	5–8	30	5	60	Communication by males, possibly for mating	

==== Codas ====
The most distinctive vocalizations are codas, which are short rhythmic sequences of clicks, mostly numbering 3–12 clicks, in stereotyped patterns. They are classified using variations in the number of clicks, rhythm, and tempo.

Codas are the result of vocal learning within a stable social group, and are made in the context of the whales' social unit. "The foundation of sperm whale society is the matrilineally based social unit of ten or so females and their offspring. The members of the unit travel together, suckle each others' infants, and babysit them while mothers make long deep dives to feed." Over 70% of a sperm whale's time is spent independently foraging; codas "could help whales reunite and reaffirm their social ties in between long foraging dives".

While nonidentity codas are commonly used in multiple different clans, some codas express clan identity, and denote different patterns of travel, foraging, and socializing or avoidance among clans. In particular, whales will not group with whales of another clan even though they share the same geographical area. Statistically, as the clans' ranges become more overlapped, the distinction in clan identity coda usage becomes more pronounced. Distinctive codas identify seven clans described among the approximately 150,000 female sperm whales in the Pacific Ocean, and there are another four clans in the Atlantic. As "arbitrary traits that function as reliable indicators of cultural group membership", clan identity codas act as symbolic markers that modulate interactions between individuals.

Individual identity in sperm whale vocalizations is an ongoing scientific issue, however. A distinction needs to be made between cues and signals. Human acoustic tools can distinguish individual whales by analyzing micro-characteristics of their vocalizations, and the whales can probably do the same. This does not prove that the whales deliberately use some vocalizations to signal individual identity in the manner of the signature whistles that bottlenose dolphins use as individual labels.

== Ecology ==
=== Distribution ===
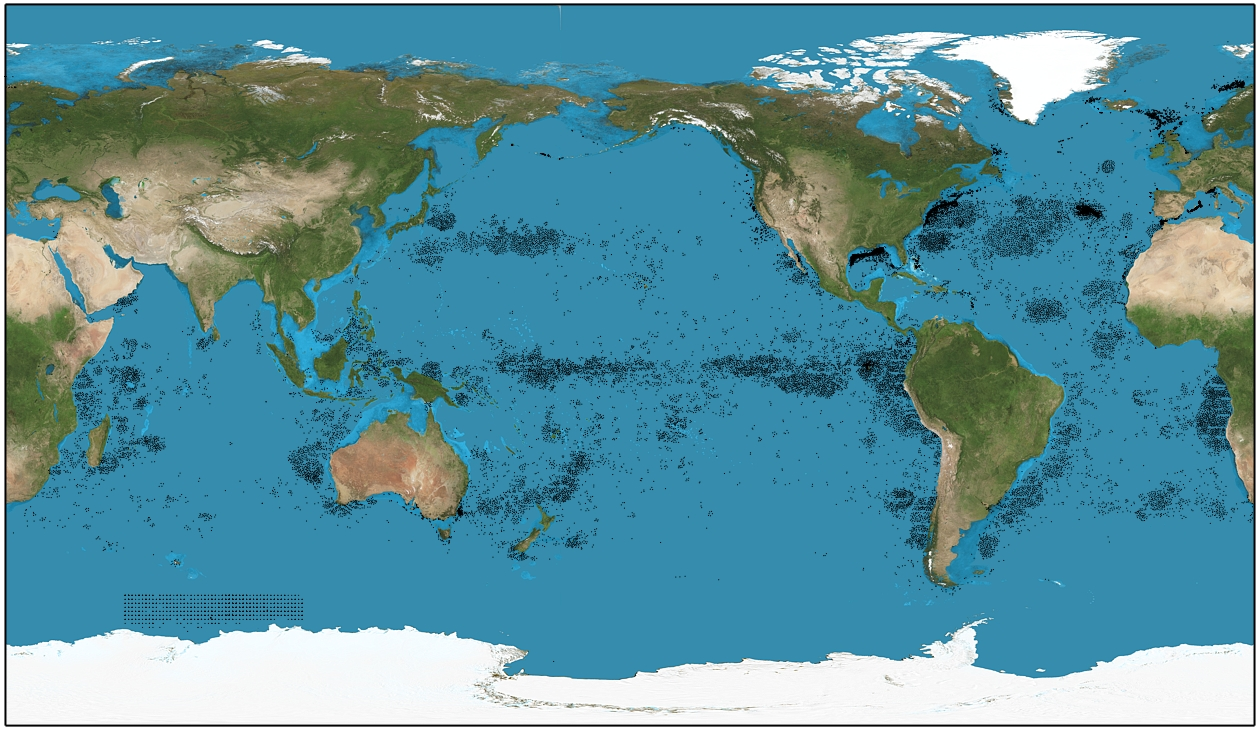
Global concentrations of sperm whales

Sperm whales are among the most cosmopolitan species. They prefer ice-free waters over 1,000 metres (3,300 ft) deep. Although both sexes range through temperate and tropical oceans and seas, only adult males populate higher latitudes. Among several regions, such as along coastal waters of southern Australia, sperm whales have been considered to be locally extinct.

They are relatively abundant from the poles to the equator and are found in all the oceans. They inhabit the Mediterranean Sea, but not the Black Sea, while their presence in the Red Sea is uncertain. The shallow entrances to both the Black Sea and the Red Sea may account for their absence. The Black Sea's lower layers are also anoxic and contain high concentrations of sulphur compounds such as hydrogen sulphide. The first ever sighting off the coast of Pakistan was made in 2017. The first ever record off the west coast of the Korean Peninsula (Yellow Sea) was made in 2005. followed by one near Ganghwa Island in 2009.

Populations are denser close to continental shelves and canyons. Sperm whales are usually found in deep, off-shore waters, but may be seen closer to shore, in areas where the continental shelf is small and drops quickly to depths of 310 to 920 metres (1,020 to 3,020 ft). Coastal areas with significant sperm whale populations include the Azores and Dominica. In east Asian waters, whales are also observed regularly in coastal waters in places such as the Commander and Kuril Islands, Shiretoko Peninsula which is one of few locations where sperm whales can be observed from shores, off Kinkasan, vicinity to Tokyo Bay and the Bōsō Peninsula to the Izu and the Izu Islands, the Volcano Islands, Yakushima and the Tokara Islands to the Ryukyu Islands, Taiwan, the Northern Mariana Islands, and so forth. Historical catch records suggest there could have been smaller aggression grounds in the Sea of Japan as well. Along the Korean Peninsula, the first confirmed observation within the Sea of Japan, eight animals off Guryongpo, was made in 2004 since after the last catches of five whales off Ulsan in 1911, In April 2025, a 10-year-old adult male, 15–20 meters (49–66 ft) long and weighing over 30 tonnes (33 short tons), was sighted at the Port of Gwangyang. while nine whales were observed in the East China Sea side of the peninsula in 1999.

Grown males are known to enter surprisingly shallow bays to rest (whales will be in a state of rest during these occasions). Unique, coastal groups have been reported from various areas around the globe, such as near Scotland's coastal waters, and the Shiretoko Peninsula, off Kaikōura, in Davao Gulf. Such coastal groups were more abundant in pre-whaling days.

Genetic analysis indicates that the world population of sperm whales originated in the Pacific Ocean from a population of about 10,000 animals around 100,000 years ago, when expanding ice caps blocked off their access to other seas. In particular, colonization of the Atlantic was revealed to have occurred multiple times during this expansion of their range.

=== Diet ===
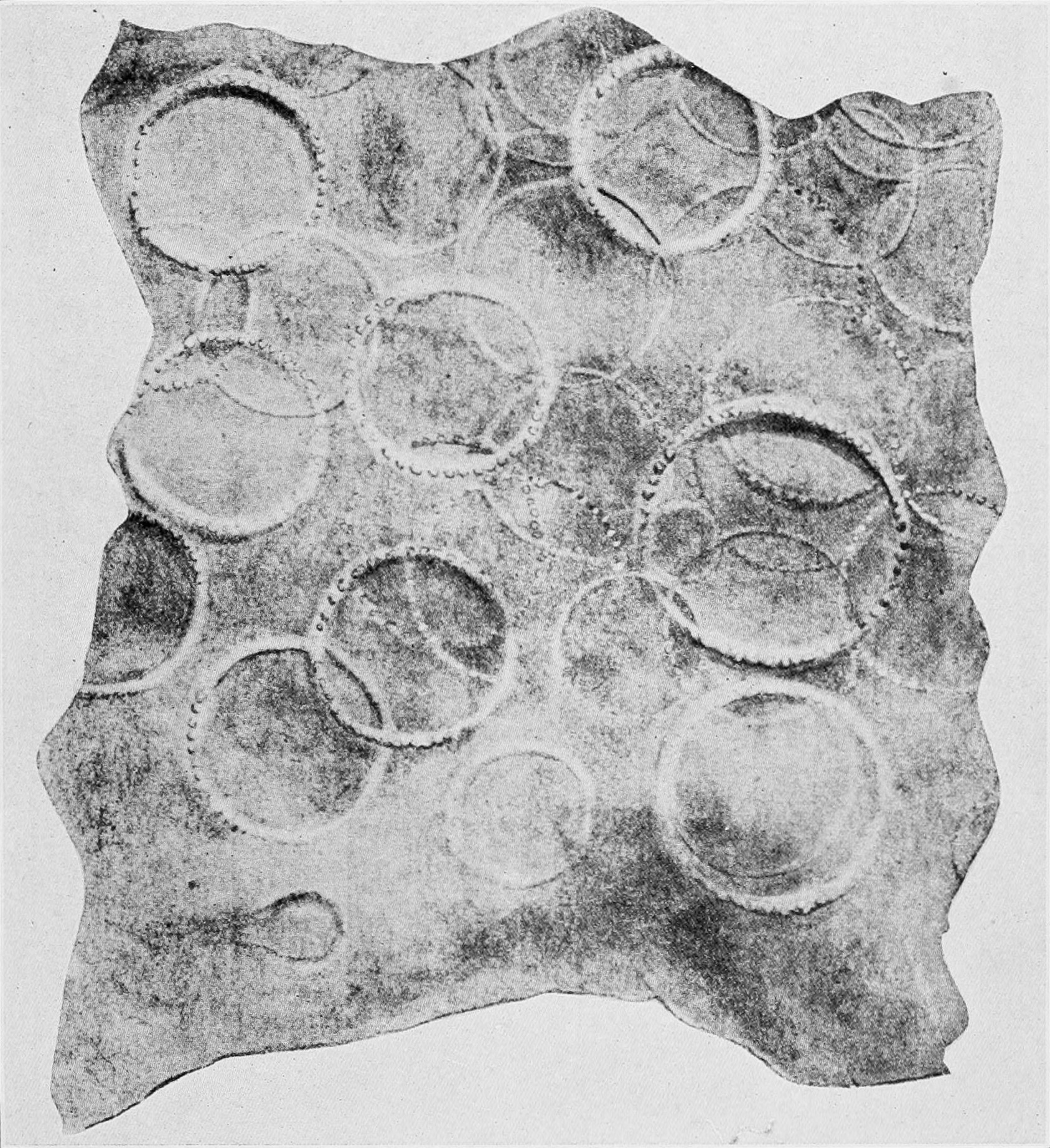
A piece of sperm whale skin with giant squid sucker scars

Sperm whales usually dive between 300 and 800 metres (980 and 2,620 ft), and sometimes 1 to 2 kilometres (3,300 to 6,600 ft), in search of food. Such dives can last more than an hour. They feed on several species, notably the giant squid, but also the colossal squid, octopuses, and fish such as demersal rays and sharks, but their diet is mainly medium-sized squid. Sperm whales may also possibly prey upon swordfish on rare occasions. Some prey may be taken accidentally while eating other items. Most of what is known about deep-sea squid has been learned from specimens in captured sperm whale stomachs, although more recent studies analysed faeces.

One study, carried out around the Galápagos, found that squid from the genera Histioteuthis (62%), Ancistrocheirus (16%), and Octopoteuthis (7%) weighing between 12 and 650 grams (0.026 and 1.433 lb) were the most commonly taken. Battles between sperm whales and giant squid or colossal squid have never been observed by humans; however, white scars are believed to be caused by the large squid. One study published in 2010 collected evidence that suggests that female sperm whales may collaborate when hunting Humboldt squid. Tagging studies have shown that sperm whales hunt upside down at the bottom of their deep dives. It is suggested that the whales can see the squid silhouetted above them against the dim surface light.

An older study, examining whales captured by the New Zealand whaling fleet in the Cook Strait region, found a 1.69:1 ratio of squid to fish by weight. Sperm whales sometimes take sablefish and toothfish from long lines. Long-line fishing operations in the Gulf of Alaska complain that sperm whales take advantage of their fishing operations to eat desirable species straight off the line, sparing the whales the need to hunt. However, the amount of fish taken is very little compared to what the sperm whale needs per day. Video footage has been captured of a large male sperm whale "bouncing" a long line, to gain the fish. Sperm whales are believed to prey on the megamouth shark, a rare and large deep-sea species discovered in the 1970s. In one case, three sperm whales were observed attacking or playing with a megamouth.

Sperm whales have also been noted to feed on bioluminescent pyrosomes such as Pyrosoma atlanticum. It is thought that the foraging strategy of sperm whales for bioluminescent squids may also explain the presence of these light-emitting pyrosomes in the diet of the sperm whale.

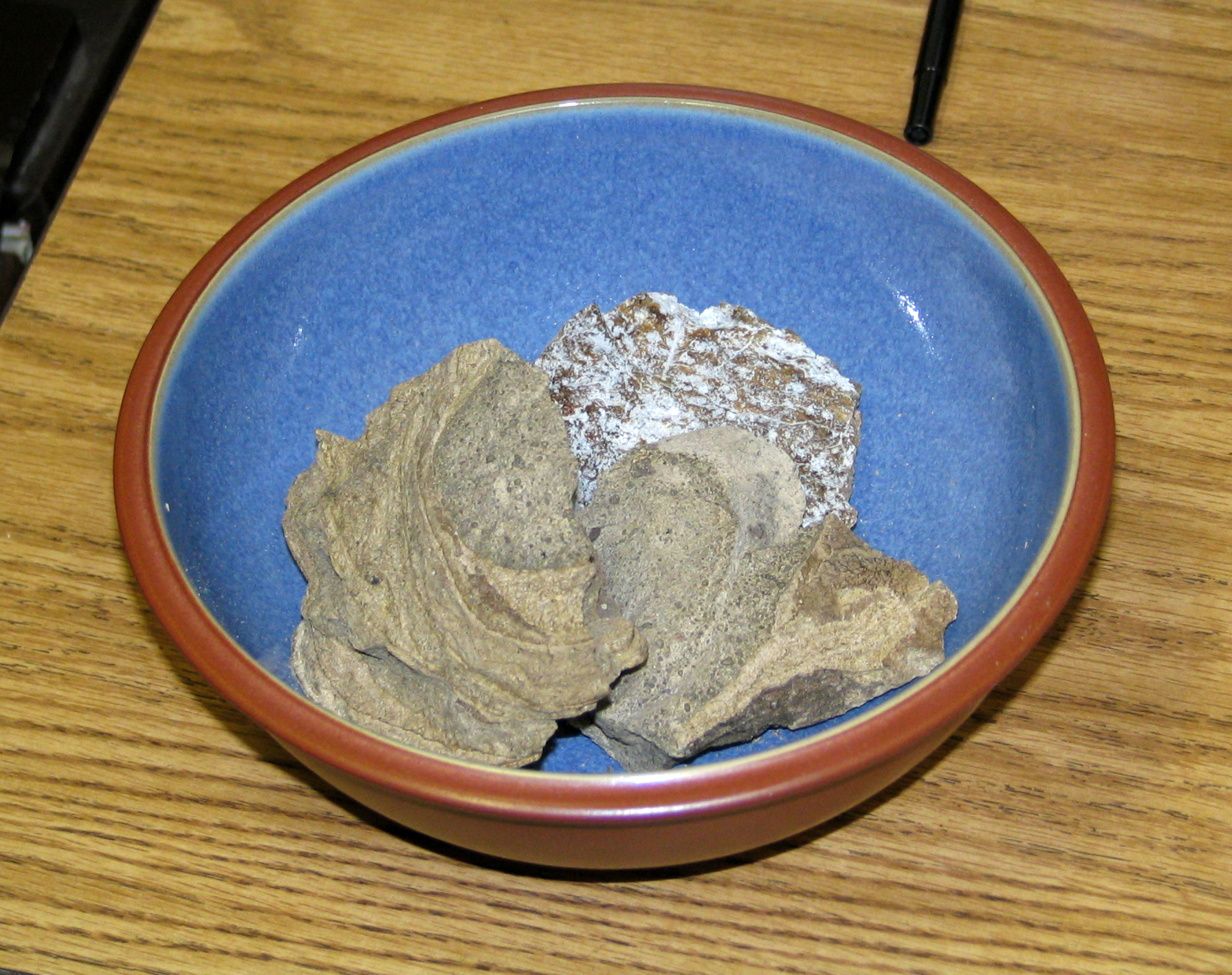
Ambergris

The sharp beak of a consumed squid lodged in the whale's intestine may lead to the production of ambergris, analogous to the production of pearls in oysters. The irritation of the intestines caused by squid beaks stimulates the secretion of this lubricant-like substance.

Sperm whales are prodigious feeders and eat around 3% of their body weight per day.

Sperm whales hunt through echolocation. Their clicks are among the most powerful sounds in the animal kingdom (see above). It has been hypothesised that it can stun prey with its clicks. Experimental studies attempting to duplicate this effect have been unable to replicate the supposed injuries, casting doubt on this idea. One study showing that sound pressure levels on the squid are more than an order of magnitude below levels required for debilitation, and therefore, precluding acoustic stunning to facilitate prey capture.

Sperm whales, as well as other large cetaceans, help fertilise the surface of the ocean by consuming nutrients in the depths and transporting those nutrients to the oceans' surface when they defecate, an effect known as the whale pump. This fertilises phytoplankton and other plants on the surface of the ocean and contributes to ocean productivity and the drawdown of atmospheric carbon.

== Life cycle ==
Sperm whales can live 70 years or more. The oldest recorded living sperm whale was 77–80 years old. According to data on cetacean hunting collected in South Africa, the ages of the older individuals among the 22 surveyed were estimated to be between 42 and 61 years. They are a prime example of a species that has been K-selected, meaning their reproductive strategy is associated with stable environmental conditions and comprises a low birth rate, significant parental aid to offspring, slow maturation, and high longevity.

How they choose mates has not been definitively determined. Bulls will fight with each other over females, and males will mate with multiple females, making them polygynous, but they do not dominate the group as in a harem. Bulls do not provide paternal care to their offspring but rather play a fatherly role to younger bulls to show dominance.

Recent studies have shown that associations between groups of males and females are temporary, and that associations between groups and individual males appear to be determined by female choice rather than male aggression. As if to support this, aggression between male sperm whales is rare within breeding grounds; only one case of male-male aggression was recorded over 11 years in a 40-year study around the Galapagos Islands, and no aggression was reported in a similar 20-year study off the Dominican Republic. Males do occasionally bear teeth marks, which could have occurred during intra-sex competition, but this raises the possibility that male sperm whale teeth marks may have evolved as a signal of male dominance rather than as a direct result of competition for females. However, observations may be rare because fights between males occur very quickly or under the water.

Females appear to reach sexual maturity around 6–13 years of age. Females appear to reach sexual maturity around age 9 on average and become fertile around age 10. However, the age of sexual maturity in females varies considerably across regions. Female sperm whales' reproductive capacity appears to decline steadily from the age of 10–14, then sharply after age 40. The oldest pregnant female ever recorded was 41 years old. Gestation requires 14 to 16 months, producing a single calf. Sexually mature females give birth once every 4 to 20 years (pregnancy rates were higher during the whaling era). Birth is a social event, as the mother and calf need others to protect them from predators. The other adults may jostle and bite the newborn in its first hours. Females reach their full size at about age 25-45.

Lactation proceeds for 19 to 42 months, but calves, rarely, may suckle up to 13 years. Like that of other whales, the sperm whale's milk has a higher fat content than that of terrestrial mammals: about 36%, compared to 4% in cow milk. This gives it a consistency similar to cottage cheese, which prevents it from dissolving in the water before the calf can drink it. It has an energy content of roughly 3,840 kcal/kg, compared to just 640 kcal/kg in cow milk. Calves may be allowed to suckle from females other than their mothers.

Males become sexually mature at 9–21 years. Upon reaching sexual maturity, males move to higher latitudes, where the water is colder and feeding is more productive. Females remain at lower latitudes. Males reach their full size at about age 50-60.

== Social behaviour ==
=== Relations within the species ===
Sperm whales adopt the "marguerite formation" to defend a vulnerable pod member.

Like elephants, females and their young live in matriarchal groups called pods, while bulls live apart. Bulls sometimes form loose bachelor groups with other males of similar age and size. As they grow older, they typically live solitary lives, only returning to the pod to socialize or to breed. Bulls have beached themselves together, suggesting a degree of cooperation which is not yet fully understood. The whales rarely, if ever, leave their group.

A social unit is a group of sperm whales who live and travel together over a period of years. Individuals rarely, if ever, join or leave a social unit. There is a huge variance in the size of social units. They are most commonly between six and nine individuals in size but can have more than twenty. Unlike orcas, sperm whales within a social unit show no significant tendency to associate with their genetic relatives. Females and calves spend about three-quarters of their time foraging and a quarter of their time socializing. Socializing usually takes place in the afternoon.

When sperm whales socialize, they emit complex patterns of clicks called codas. They will spend much of the time rubbing against each other. Tracking of diving whales suggests that groups engage in herding of prey, similar to bait balls created by other species, though the research needs to be confirmed by tracking the prey.

=== Relations with other species ===
The most common natural predator of sperm whales is the orca (killer whale), but pilot whales and false killer whales sometimes harass them. Orcas prey on target groups of females with young, usually making an effort to extract and kill a calf. The females will protect their calves or an injured adult by encircling them. They may face inwards with their tails out (the "marguerite formation", named after the flower). The heavy and powerful tail of an adult whale is potentially capable of delivering lethal blows. Alternatively, they may face outwards (the "heads-out formation"). Other than sperm whales, southern right whales had been observed to perform similar formations. However, formations in non-dangerous situations have been recorded as well. Early whalers exploited this behaviour, attracting a whole unit by injuring one of its members. Such a tactic is described in Moby-Dick:

"Say you strike a Forty-barrel-bull—poor devil! all his comrades quit him. But strike a member of the harem school, and her companions swim around her with every token of concern, sometimes lingering so near her and so long, as themselves to fall a prey."

If the killer whale pod is large, its members may sometimes be able to kill adult female sperm whales and can at least injure an entire pod of sperm whales. Bulls have no predators, and are believed to be too large, powerful and aggressive to be threatened by killer whales. Solitary bulls are known to interfere and come to the aid of vulnerable groups nearby. However, the bull sperm whale, when accompanying pods of female sperm whales and their calves as such, may be reportedly unable to effectively dissuade killer whales from their attacks on the group, although the killer whales may end the attack sooner when a bull is present.

At potential feeding sites, the killer whales may prevail over sperm whales even when outnumbered by the sperm whales. Some authors consider the killer whales "usually" behaviorally dominant over sperm whales but express that the two species are "fairly evenly matched", with the killer whales' greater aggression, more considerable biting force for their size and predatory prowess more than compensating for their smaller size. A 2013 study found male sperm whales changed their behavior in response to the orca sound playback by performing deep dives and reduced vocal activity. While several cases of orcas hunting bull sperm whales have been documented, none of these events were successful.

Sperm whales are not known for forging bonds with other species, but it was observed that a bottlenose dolphin with a spinal deformity had been accepted into a pod of sperm whales. They are known to swim alongside other cetaceans such as humpback, fin, minke, pilot, and killer whales on occasion. Sperm whales also engage in defensive defecation.

=== Parasites ===
Sperm whales can suffer from parasites. Out of 35 sperm whales caught during the 1976–1977 Antarctic whaling season, all of them were infected by Anisakis physeteris (in their stomachs) and Phyllobothrium delphini (in their blubber). Both whales with a placenta were infected with Placentonema gigantissima, potentially the largest nematode worm ever described.

== Evolutionary history ==
- Cetacea
  - Toothed whales
    - Physeteroidea
      - Other Physeteroidea†
      - - Kogiidae
          - Pygmy sperm whale
          - Dwarf sperm whale
        - Physeteridae
          - Other Physeteridae†
          - Sperm whale
    - - South Asian river dolphin
      - - - Other river dolphins
          - Oceanic dolphins
          - Porpoises
          - Arctic whales
        - Beaked whales
  - Baleen whales

Evolutionary family tree of sperm whales,
including simplified summary of extinct groups (†)

=== Fossil record ===
Although the fossil record is poor, several extinct genera have been assigned to the clade Physeteroidea, which includes the last common ancestor of the modern sperm whale, pygmy sperm whales, dwarf sperm whales, and extinct physeteroids. These fossils include Ferecetotherium, Idiorophus, Diaphorocetus, Aulophyseter, Orycterocetus, Scaldicetus, Placoziphius, Zygophyseter and Acrophyseter. Ferecetotherium, found in Azerbaijan and dated to the late Oligocene (about 28 to 23 million years ago), is the most primitive fossil that has been found, which possesses sperm whale-specific features, such as an asymmetric rostrum ("beak" or "snout"). Most sperm whale fossils date from the Miocene period, 23 to 5 million years ago. Diaphorocetus, from Argentina, has been dated to the early Miocene. Fossil sperm whales from the Middle Miocene include Aulophyseter, Idiorophus and Orycterocetus, all of which were found on the West Coast of the United States, and Scaldicetus, found in Europe and Japan. Orycterocetus fossils have also been found in the North Atlantic Ocean and the Mediterranean Sea, in addition to the west coast of the United States. Placoziphius, found in Europe, and Acrophyseter, from Peru, are dated to the late Miocene.

Fossil sperm whales differ from modern sperm whales in tooth count and the shape of the face and jaws. For example, Scaldicetus had a tapered rostrum. Genera from the Oligocene and early and middle Miocene, with the possible exception of Aulophyseter, had teeth in their upper jaws. Acrophyseter, from the late Miocene, also had teeth in both the upper and lower jaws as well as a short rostrum and an upward curving mandible (lower jaw). These anatomical differences suggest that fossil species may not have necessarily been deep-sea squid eaters such as the modern sperm whale, but that some genera mainly ate fish. Zygophyseter, dated from the middle to late Miocene and found in southern Italy, had teeth in both jaws and appears to have been adapted to feed on large prey, rather like the modern killer whale (orca). Other fossil sperm whales with adaptations similar to this are collectively known as killer sperm whales.

Two poorly known fossil species belonging to the modern genus Physeter have been recognized so far: P. antiquus (Neogene of France) and P. vetus (Neogene of eastern North America). Physeter vetus is very likely an invalid species, as the few teeth that were used to identify this species appear to be identical to those of another toothed whale, Orycterocetus quadratidens.

=== Phylogeny ===
The traditional view has been that Mysticeti (baleen whales) and Odontoceti (toothed whales) arose from more primitive whales early in the Oligocene period, and that the super-family Physeteroidea, which contains the sperm whale, dwarf sperm whale, and pygmy sperm whale, diverged from other toothed whales soon after that, over 23 million years ago. From 1993 to 1996, molecular phylogenetics analyses by Milinkovitch and colleagues, based on comparing the genes of various modern whales, suggested that the sperm whales are more closely related to the baleen whales than they are to other toothed whales, which would have meant that Odontoceti were not monophyletic; in other words, it did not consist of a single ancestral toothed whale species and all its descendants. However, more recent studies, based on various combinations of comparative anatomy and molecular phylogenetics, criticised Milinkovitch's analysis on technical grounds and reaffirmed that the Odontoceti are monophyletic.

These analyses also confirm that there was a rapid evolutionary radiation (diversification) of the Physeteroidea in the Miocene period. The Kogiidae (dwarf and pygmy sperm whales) diverged from the Physeteridae (true sperm whales) at least 8 million years ago.

== Usage by humans ==
=== Sperm whaling ===
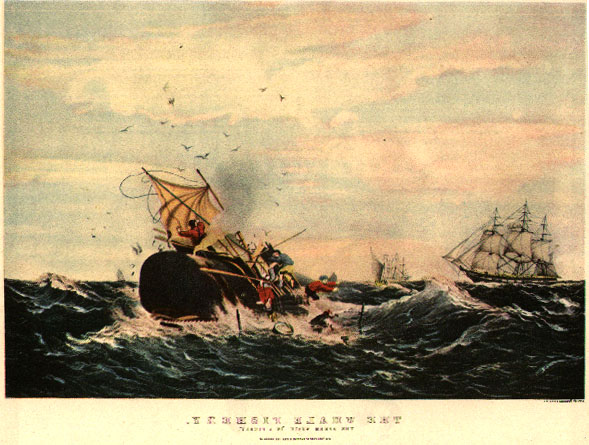
In the 19th century, sperm whales were hunted using rowboats and hand-thrown harpoons, a rather dangerous method, as the whales sometimes fought back.

Spermaceti, obtained primarily from the spermaceti organ, and sperm oil, obtained primarily from the blubber in the body, were much sought after by 18th, 19th, and 20th century whalers. These substances found a variety of commercial applications, such as candles, soap, cosmetics, machine oil, other specialised lubricants, lamp oil, pencils, crayons, leather waterproofing, rust-proofing materials and many pharmaceutical compounds. Ambergris, a highly expensive, solid, waxy, flammable substance produced in the digestive system of sperm whales, was also sought as a fixative in perfumery.

Prior to the early eighteenth century, hunting was mostly by indigenous Indonesians. Legend has it that sometime in the early 18th century, around 1712, Captain Christopher Hussey, while cruising for right whales near shore, was blown offshore by a northerly wind, where he encountered a sperm whale pod and killed one. Although the story may not be true, sperm whales were indeed soon exploited by American whalers. Judge Paul Dudley, in his Essay upon the Natural History of Whales (1725), states that a certain Atkins, 10 or 12 years in the trade, was among the first to catch sperm whales sometime around 1720 off the New England coast.

There were only a few recorded instances during the first few decades (1709–1730s) of offshore sperm whaling. Instead, sloops concentrated on the Nantucket Shoals, where they would have taken right whales or went to the Davis Strait region to catch bowhead whales. By the early 1740s, with the advent of spermaceti candles (before 1743), American vessels began to focus on sperm whales. The diary of Benjamin Bangs (1721–1769) shows that, along with the bumpkin sloop he sailed, he found three other sloops flensing sperm whales off the coast of North Carolina in late May 1743. On returning to Nantucket in the summer 1744 on a subsequent voyage, he noted that "45 spermacetes are brought in here this day," another indication that American sperm whaling was in full swing.

American sperm whaling soon spread from the east coast of the American colonies to the Gulf Stream, the Grand Banks, West Africa (1763), the Azores (1765), and the South Atlantic (1770s). From 1770 to 1775 Massachusetts, New York, Connecticut, and Rhode Island ports produced 45,000 barrels of sperm oil annually, compared to 8,500 of whale oil. In the same decade, the British began sperm whaling, employing American ships and personnel. By the following decade, the French had entered the trade, also employing American expertise. Sperm whaling increased until the mid-nineteenth century. Spermaceti oil was important in public lighting (for example, in lighthouses, where it was used in the United States until 1862, when it was replaced by lard oil, in turn replaced by petroleum) and for lubricating the machines (such as those used in cotton mills) of the Industrial Revolution. Sperm whaling declined in the second half of the nineteenth century, as petroleum came into broader use. In that sense, petroleum use may be said to have protected whale populations from even greater exploitation. Sperm whaling in the 18th century began with small sloops carrying only one or two whaleboats. The fleet's scope and size increased over time, and larger ships entered the fishery. In the late 18th century and early 19th century, sperm whaling ships sailed to the equatorial Pacific, the Indian Ocean, Japan, the coast of Arabia, Australia and New Zealand. Hunting could be dangerous to the crew, since sperm whales (especially bulls) will readily fight to defend themselves against attack, unlike most baleen whales. When dealing with a threat, sperm whales will use their huge head effectively as a battering ram. Arguably the most famous sperm whale counter-attack occurred on 20 November 1820, when a whale claimed to be about 25.9 metres (85 ft) long rammed and sank the Nantucket whaleship Essex. Only 8 out of 20 remaining sailors survived to be rescued by other ships. This instance is popularly believed to have inspired Herman Melville's famous book Moby-Dick.

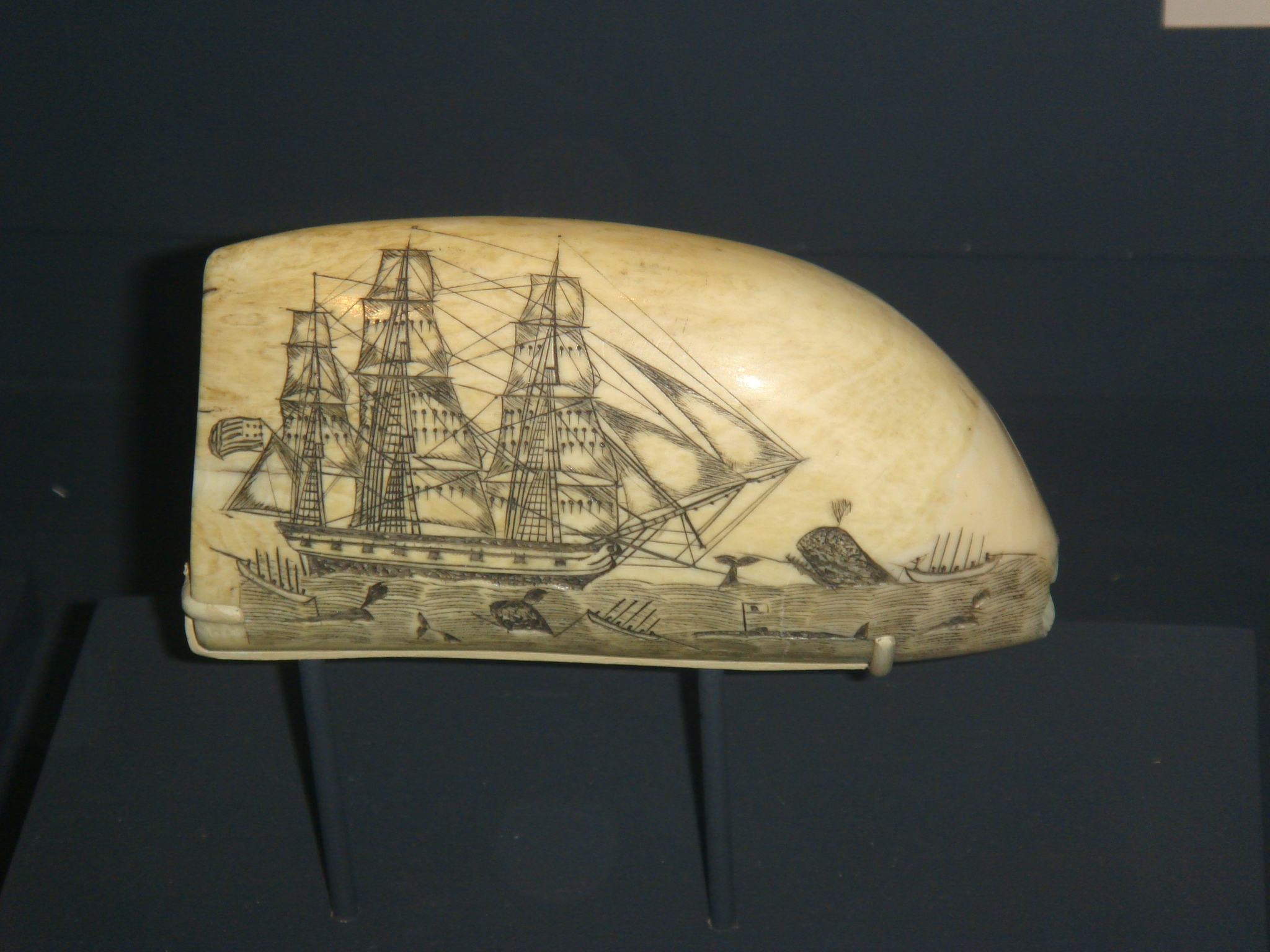
Scrimshaw was the art of engraving on the teeth of sperm whales. It was a way for whalers to pass the time between hunts.

The sperm whale's ivory-like teeth were often sought by 18th- and 19th-century whalers, who used them to produce inked carvings known as scrimshaw. 30 teeth of the sperm whale can be used for ivory. Each of these teeth, up to 20 cm (8 in) and 8 cm (3 in) across, are hollow for the first half of their length. Like walrus ivory, sperm whale ivory has two distinct layers. However, sperm whale ivory contains a much thicker inner layer. Though a widely practised art in the 19th century, scrimshaw using genuine sperm whale ivory declined substantially after the retirement of the whaling fleets in the 1880s.

Modern whaling was more efficient than open-boat whaling, employing steam-powered ships and exploding harpoons. Initially, modern whaling activity focused on large baleen whales, but as these populations were taken, sperm whaling increased. Spermaceti, the fine waxy oil produced by sperm whales, was in high demand. In both the 1941–1942 and 1942–1943 seasons, Norwegian expeditions took over 3,000 sperm whales off the coast of Peru alone. After World War II, whaling continued unabated to obtain oil for cosmetics and high-performance machinery, such as automobile transmissions.

The hunting led to the near-extinction of large whales, including sperm whales, until bans on whale oil use were instituted in 1972. The International Whaling Commission gave the species full protection in 1985, but hunting by Japan in the northern Pacific Ocean continued until 1988.

It is estimated that the historic worldwide population numbered 1,100,000 before commercial sperm whaling began in the early 18th century. By 1880, it had declined by an estimated 29 percent. From that date until 1946, the population appears to have partially recovered as whaling activity decreased, but after the Second World War, the population declined even further, to 33 per cent of the pre-whaling population. Between 184,000 and 236,000 sperm whales were killed by the various whaling nations in the 19th century, while in the 20th century, at least 770,000 were taken, the majority between 1946 and 1980.

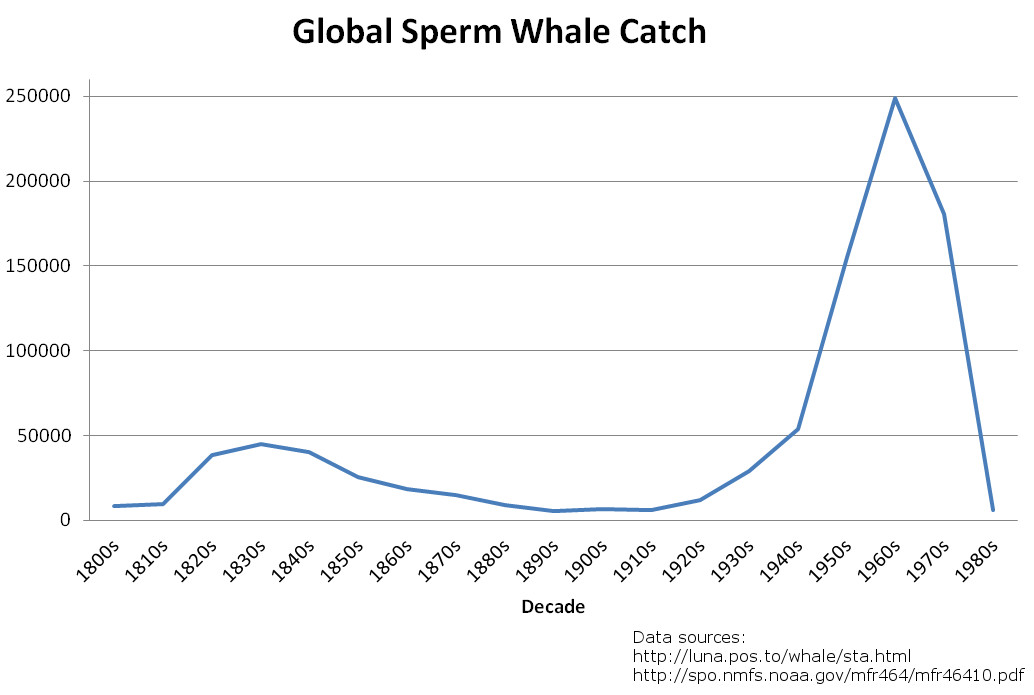
Sperm whaling peaked in the 1830s and 1960s.

Sperm whales increase levels of primary production and carbon export by depositing iron-rich faeces into surface waters of the Southern Ocean The iron-rich faeces cause phytoplankton to grow and take up more carbon from the atmosphere. When the phytoplankton dies, it sinks to the deep ocean and takes the atmospheric carbon with it. By reducing the abundance of sperm whales in the Southern Ocean, whaling has resulted in an extra 2 million tonnes of carbon remaining in the atmosphere each year.

Remaining sperm whale populations are large enough that the species' conservation status is rated as vulnerable rather than endangered. The current global sperm whale population is estimated at 360,000. However, the recovery from centuries of commercial whaling is a slow process, particularly in the South Pacific, where the toll on breeding-age males was severe.

=== Conservation status ===
The total number of sperm whales worldwide is unknown, but it is estimated to be as many as 360,000. The conservation outlook is brighter than for many other whales. Commercial whaling has ceased, and the species is protected almost worldwide, though records indicate that in the 11-year period starting from 2000, Japanese vessels have caught 51 sperm whales. Fishermen do not target sperm whales to eat, but long-line fishing operations in the Gulf of Alaska have complained about sperm whales "stealing" fish from their lines.

Since the 2000s, entanglement in fishing nets and collisions with ships represent the greatest threats to the sperm whale population. Other threats include ingestion of marine debris, ocean noise, and chemical pollution. The International Union for Conservation of Nature (IUCN) regards the sperm whale as being "vulnerable". The species is listed as endangered on the United States Endangered Species Act.

Sperm whales are listed on Appendix I and Appendix II of the Convention on the Conservation of Migratory Species of Wild Animals (CMS). It is listed on Appendix I as this species has been categorized as being in danger of extinction throughout all or a significant proportion of their range and CMS Parties strive towards strictly protecting these animals, conserving or restoring the places where they live, mitigating obstacles to migration and controlling other factors that might endanger them. It is listed on Appendix II as it has an unfavourable conservation status or would benefit significantly from international co-operation organised by tailored agreements. It is also covered by the Agreement on the Conservation of Cetaceans in the Black Sea, Mediterranean Sea and Contiguous Atlantic Area (ACCOBAMS) and the Memorandum of Understanding for the Conservation of Cetaceans and Their Habitats in the Pacific Islands Region (Pacific Cetaceans MOU).

The species is protected under Appendix I of the Convention on International Trade in Endangered Species of Wild Fauna and Flora (CITES). This makes commercial international trade (including in parts and derivatives) prohibited, with all other international trade strictly regulated through a system of permits and certificates.

=== Cultural importance ===
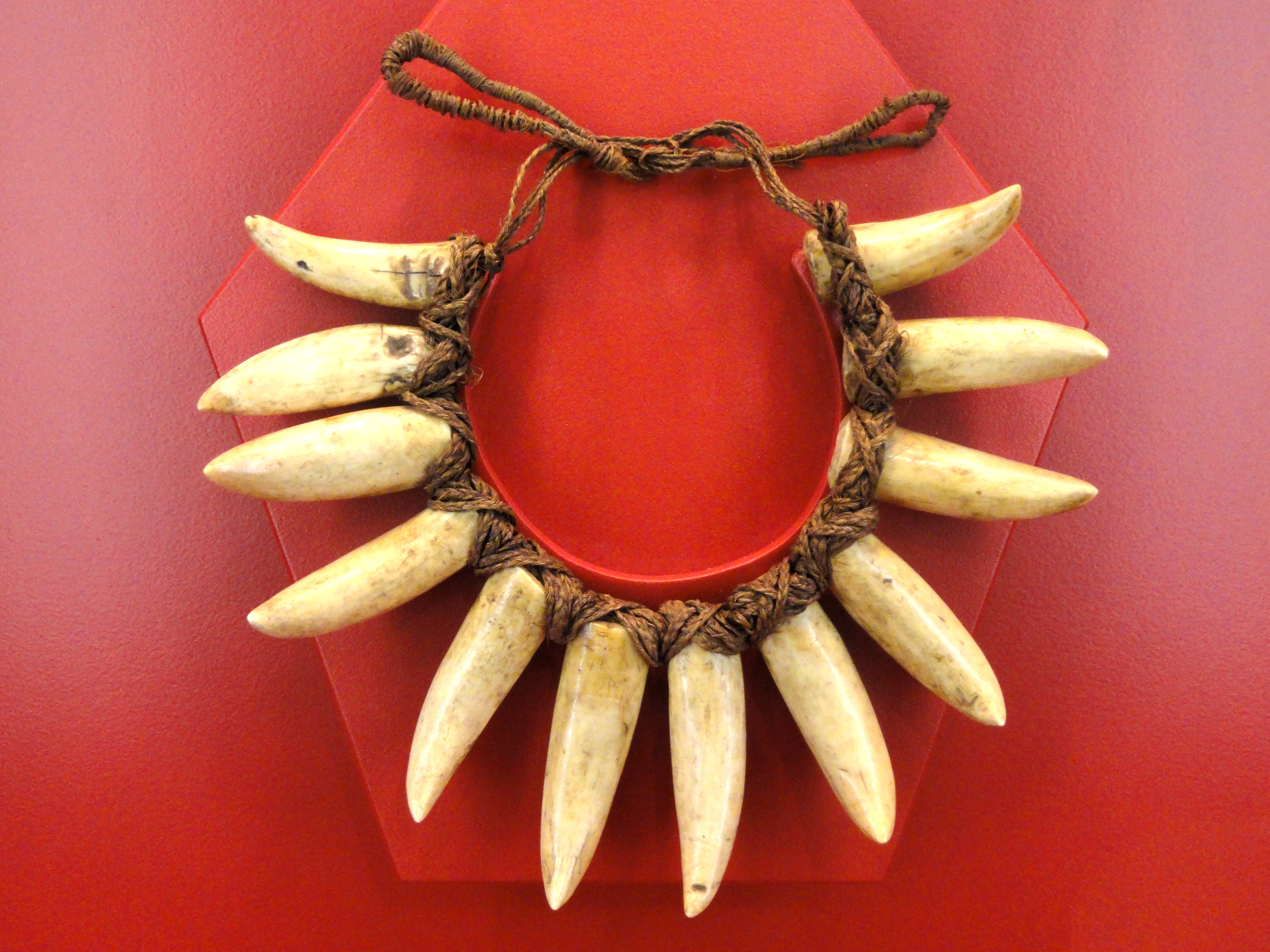
Sperm whale teeth necklace from Fiji

Rope-mounted teeth are important cultural objects throughout the Pacific. In New Zealand, the Māori know them as "rei puta"; such whale tooth pendants were rare objects because sperm whales were not actively hunted in traditional Māori society. Whale ivory and bone were taken from beached whales. In Fiji the teeth are known as tabua, traditionally given as gifts for atonement or esteem (called sevusevu), and were important in negotiations between rival chiefs. Friedrich Ratzel in The History of Mankind reported in 1896 that, in Fiji, whales' or cachalots' teeth were the most-demanded article of ornament or value. They occurred often in necklaces. Today the tabua remains an important item in Fijian life. The teeth were originally rare in Fiji and Tonga, which exported teeth, but with the Europeans' arrival, teeth flooded the market and this "currency" collapsed. The oversupply led in turn to the development of the European art of scrimshaw.

Herman Melville's novel Moby-Dick is based on a true story about a sperm whale that attacked and sank the whaleship Essex. Melville associated the sperm whale with the Bible's Leviathan. The fearsome reputation perpetuated by Melville was based on bull whales' ability to fiercely defend themselves from attacks by early whalers, smashing whaling boats and, occasionally, attacking and destroying whaling ships.

In Jules Verne's 1870 novel Twenty Thousand Leagues Under the Seas, the submarine Nautilus fights a group of "cachalots" (sperm whales) to protect a pod of southern right whales from their attacks. Verne portrays them as being savage hunters ("nothing but mouth and teeth").

The sperm whale was designated as the Connecticut state animal by the General Assembly in 1975. It was selected because of its specific contribution to the state's history and because of its present-day plight as an endangered species.

Harpooned and entangled sperm whales may have been responsible for well-known sea serpent sightings.

=== Watching sperm whales ===
Sperm whales are not the easiest of whales to watch, due to their long dive times and ability to travel long distances underwater. However, due to the distinctive look and large size of the whale, watching is increasingly popular. Sperm whale watchers often use hydrophones to listen to the clicks of the whales and locate them before they surface. Popular locations for sperm whale watching include the town of Kaikōura on New Zealand's South Island, Andenes and Tromsø in Arctic Norway; as well as the Azores, where the continental shelf is so narrow that whales can be observed from the shore, and Dominica where a long-term scientific research program, The Dominica Sperm Whale Project, has been in operation since 2005.

=== Plastic waste ===
The introduction of plastic waste to the ocean environment by humans is relatively new. From the 1970s, sperm whales have occasionally been found with pieces of plastic in their stomachs.

== See also ==
- List of sperm whale strandings
- List of cetaceans
- List of individual cetaceans
- Marine biology
- Livyatan
