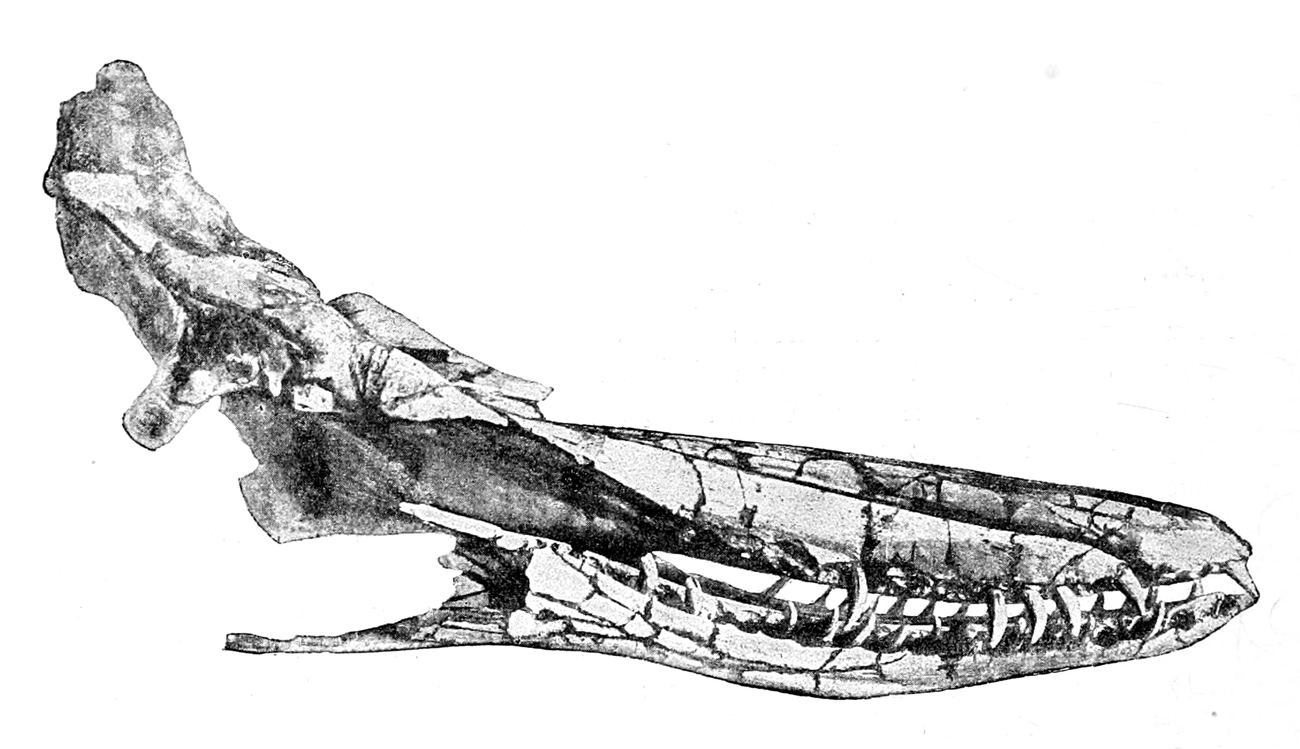
- I. patagonicus

Scientific classification
- Kingdom: Animalia
- Phylum: Chordata
- Class: Mammalia
- Order: Artiodactyla
- Infraorder: Cetacea
- Family: Physeteridae
- Genus: †Idiorophus; Kellogg, 1925

Species
- I. bolzanensis Dal Piaz, 1916; I. patagonicus Lydekker, 1894

Synonyms
- Apenophyseter Cabrera, 1926

= Idiorophus =

Idiorophus Temporal range: Early Miocene ~20.43–15.97 Ma

Extinct genus of mammals

Idiorophus is a genus of extinct toothed whales in the family Physeteridae. Fossils have been found in the Colhuehuapian Gaiman Formation of Argentina and the Libano Sandstone in Italy.

== Description ==
Idirophus is thought to have been 5.42–6.61 meters (17.8–21.7 ft) and 6.64 meters (21.8 ft) long. I. patagonicus was one of the largest known physeteroids of the Early Miocene.

The teeth of Idiorophus were comparable in size to those of modern orca and were covered in enamel. Its upper teeth are also thought to have remained functional. Its rostrum was elongated and narrow, resembling the neck of a wine bottle. Unlike contemporary physeteroids such as Cozzuoliphyseter, Diaphorocetus, Placoziphius its lower jaw exhibited morphological adaptations associated with raptorial feeding, suggesting that it was capable of actively capturing and subduing prey.

== Palaeontology ==
Unlike other physeteroids from Early Miocene South America, Idiorophus was relatively large and retained functional upper teeth. Its elongated, bottle-neck-shaped rostrum and well-developed temporal fossae are thought to have been adaptations for actively seizing prey. These features suggest that Idiorophus was a raptorial feeder during the Early Miocene, potentially hunting large fish and possibly seabirds. Additionally, large body size, reaching approximately 6.6 meters (22 ft) in length, may also be interpreted as a adaptation for hunting prey.

== Taxonomy ==
It has been proposed that Idiorophus be placed in the subfamily Hoplocetinae, alongside Scaldicetus, Diaphorocetus, and Hoplocetus.

In the phylogenetic analysis conducted by Paolucci et al. (2025), Idiorophus was recovered as a basal member of the family Physeteridae.
