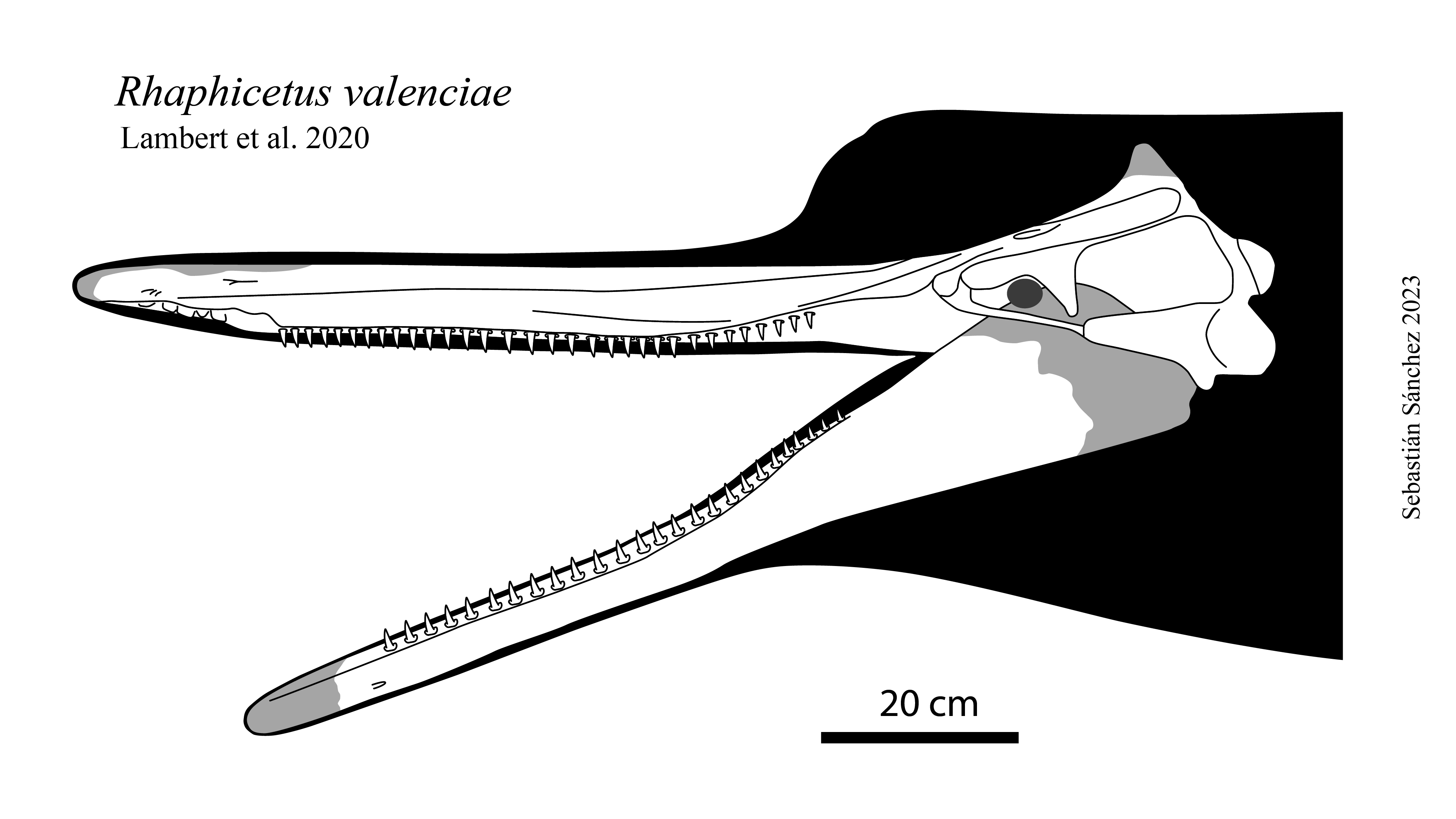
- Reconstruction of the skull

Scientific classification
- Kingdom: Animalia
- Phylum: Chordata
- Class: Mammalia
- Infraclass: Placentalia
- Order: Artiodactyla
- Infraorder: Cetacea
- Superfamily: Physeteroidea
- Family: †Incertae sedis
- Genus: †Rhaphicetus; Lambert et al., 2020
- Species: †R. valenciae

Binomial name
- †Rhaphicetus valenciae Lambert et al., 2020

= Rhaphicetus =

Rhaphicetus Temporal range: Early Miocene 19–18 Ma

Genus of toothed whales

Rhaphicetus is an extinct genus of physeteroid whale that lived in Peru in the lower Miocene epoch around 19-18 million years ago. This genus contains one species, Raphicetus valenciae, representing one of the earliest branching stem physteroid.

== Description ==
This genus is medium sized with an estimated length of 4.7–5.7 metres (15–19 ft). It has a narrow and cylindrical rostrum that comprises nearly 75% of the condylobasal length. The upper jaw has at least 36 teeth per quadrant.
