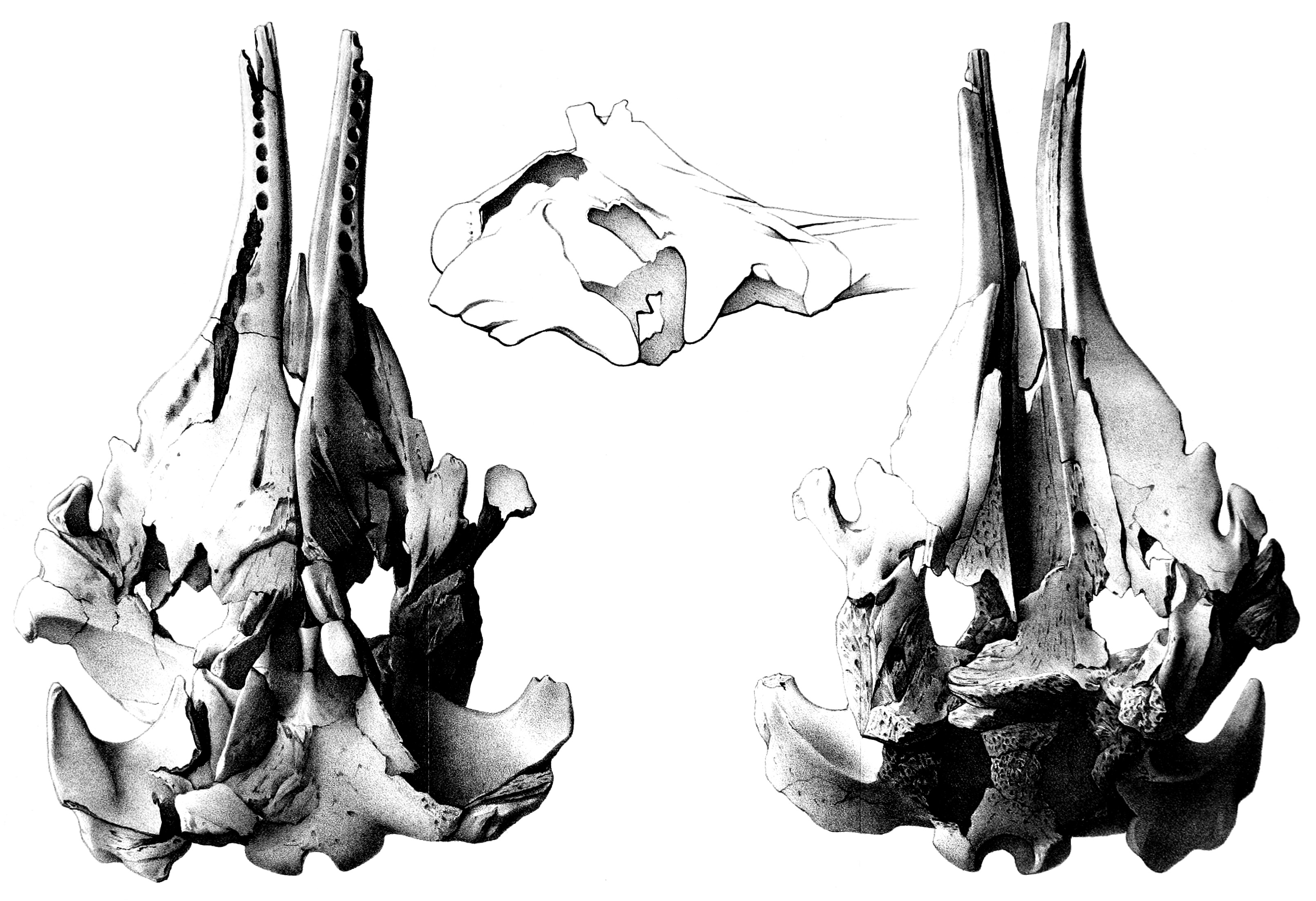
- Diaphorocetus poucheti skull

Scientific classification
- Kingdom: Animalia
- Phylum: Chordata
- Class: Mammalia
- Order: Artiodactyla
- Infraorder: Cetacea
- Superfamily: Physeteroidea
- Family: †Incertae sedis
- Genus: †Diaphorocetus; Ameghino, 1894

Species
- D. poucheti (type)

Synonyms
- Hypocetus Lydekker 1893; Mesocetus Moreno 1892; Paracetus Lydekker 1893

= Diaphorocetus =

Diaphorocetus Temporal range: Early Miocene (Deseadan-Colhuehuapian) ~23.03–20.43 Ma

Extinct genus of mammals

Diaphorocetus is an extinct genus of odontocete cetacean belonging to Physeteroidea. Its remains were found in the Monte León Formation of Argentina, dating to the Early Miocene.

== Systematics ==
Diaphorocetus was originally named Mesocetus by Moreno (1892). Lydekker (1893) found that Mesocetus was already in use for an extinct mysticete, so he renamed the sperm whale Hypocetus. Ameghino (1894) too recognized Moreno's name as preoccupied, but unaware of Lydekker's paper, coined his own replacement name Diaphorocetus for Mesocetus. Diaphorocetus was declared a nomen protectum (protected name) by Paolucci et al. (2019) because Hypocetus and Paracetus have not been used as valid since 1899 under Article 23.9 of the Code.

== Paleobiology ==
With a total body length of 3.5–4 m, Diaphorocetus is one of the smallest physeteroids yet known. The small teeth of Diaphorocetus and the bottleneck-like nature of the rostrum suggest that Diaphorocetus employed a feeding strategy intermediate between that of raptorial sperm whales like Acrophyseter and Livyatan and extant sperm whales.
