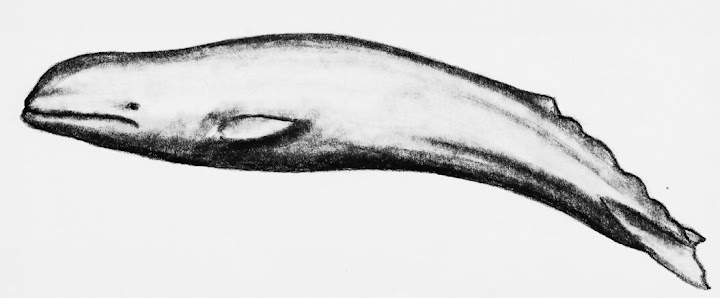

Scientific classification
- Kingdom: Animalia
- Phylum: Chordata
- Class: Mammalia
- Order: Artiodactyla
- Infraorder: Cetacea
- Family: Physeteridae
- Genus: †Orycterocetus; Leidy, 1853

Species
- O. quadratidens Leidy, 1853 (type species); O. crocodilinus Cope, 1868; O. cornutidens Leidy, 1856

= Orycterocetus =

Orycterocetus Temporal range: Miocene

Extinct genus of mammals

Orycterocetus is an extinct genus of sperm whale from the Miocene of the northern Atlantic Ocean. It is thought to have been similar in size to Acrophyseter.

== Classification ==
Orycterocetus is a member of Physeteroidea closely related to crown-group sperm whales. The type species, O. quadratidens, was first named by Joseph Leidy on the basis of two teeth, two partial mandibular rami, and a rib from Neogene deposits of Virginia. Two more species were subsequently described, O. cornutidens Leidy 1856 and O. crocodilinus Cope, 1868, the latter from the middle Miocene Calvert Formation.

== Sources ==
- Cenozoic Seas: The View From Eastern North America by Edward J. Petuch
- Marine Mammals: Evolutionary Biology by Annalisa Berta and James L. Sumich
