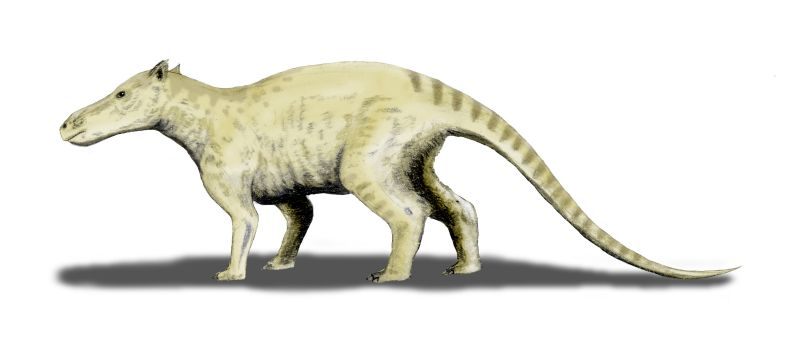
- Ichthyolestes life restoration, pencil drawing

Scientific classification
- Kingdom: Animalia
- Phylum: Chordata
- Class: Mammalia
- Order: Artiodactyla
- Infraorder: Cetacea
- Family: †Pakicetidae
- Genus: †Ichthyolestes; Dehm & Oettingen-Spielberg, 1958

Type species
- †Ichthyolestes pinfoldi Dehm & Oettingen-Spielberg, 1958

= Ichthyolestes =

Ichthyolestes Temporal range: Early Eocene, circa 50 Ma

Genus of ancient whales

Ichthyolestes (meaning "fish robber" from Ancient Greek ἰχθύς (ikhthús), meaning "fish", and λῃστής (lēistḗs), meaning "robber") is an extinct genus of pakicetid cetacean endemic to the northern Indian subcontinent during the Lutetian age of the Eocene. It is monotypic, with I. pinfoldi as the only species.

Similar to other pakicetids, which are considered the earliest and least specialized of the archaic cetaceans, Ichthyolestes represents an early quadrupedal phase in the land-to-sea transition in cetaceans.

== Discovery and classification ==
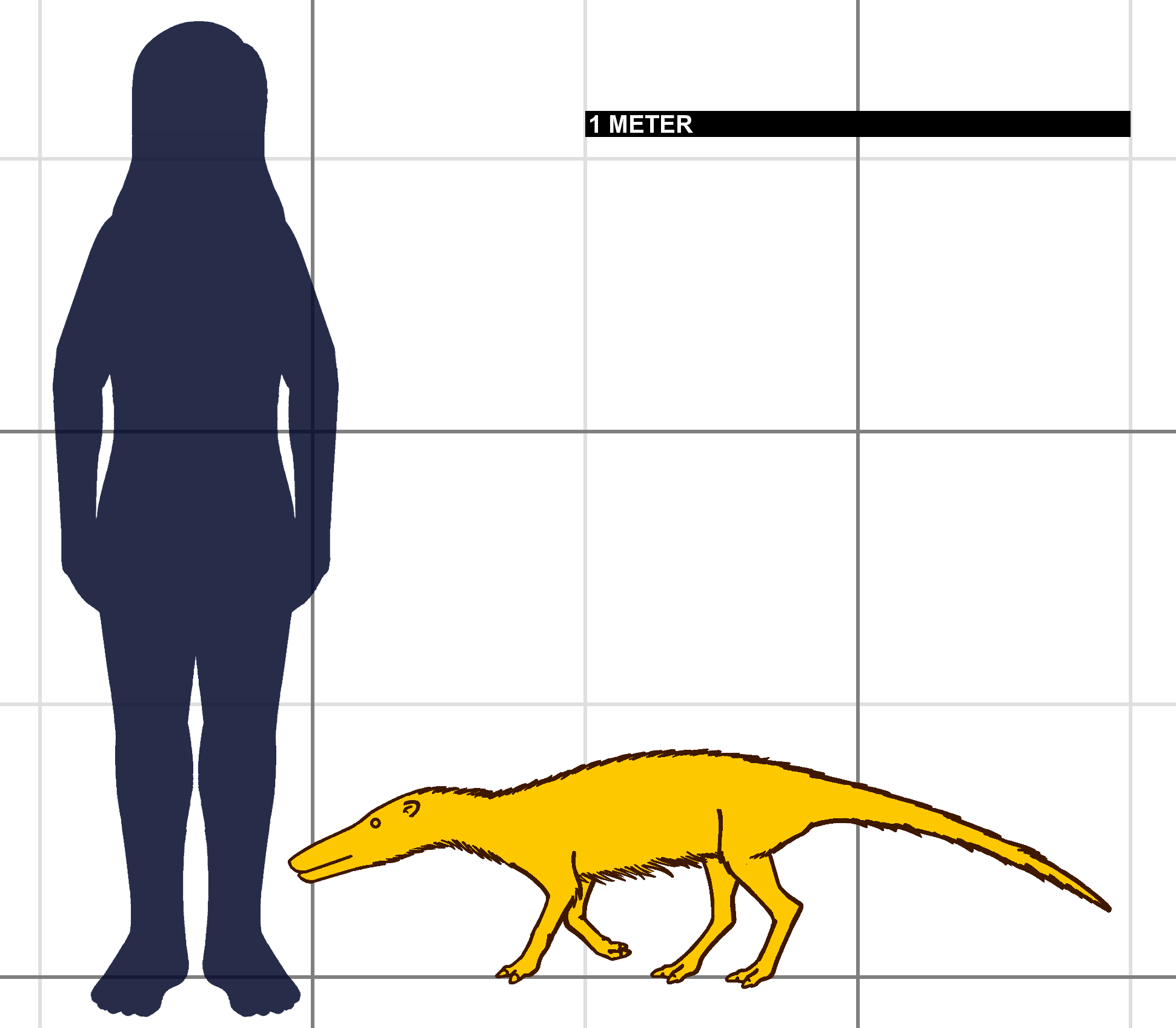
Size of Ichthyolestes compared to a human

Ichthyolestes pinfoldi was initially known only from teeth, which were found in the Eocene aged Ganda Kas formation, Pakistan. Upon its discovery, I. pinfoldi was placed within the family Mesonychidae, a group of terrestrial mammals previously thought to be the ancestors to cetaceans. Due to differences with mesonychids, I. pinfoldi was reclassified as an archaeocete within the family Pakicetidae.

Fossils of I. pinfoldi have also been found in the Kuldana Formation, Pakistan, from the early-middle Eocene, and from the Early Eocene Subathu Formation sediments of Jammu and Kashmir, India.

== Description ==
Ichthyolestes is the smallest pakicetid, approximately 29% smaller than Pakicetus, and has been considered "fox-sized". They retain many features typical of terrestrial Eocene artiodactyls, including long and gracile limb bones, a fused sacrum, small mandibular foramen, and no cranial telescoping. The body plan of Ichthyolestes is generally similar to Pakicetus, but smaller and more gracile. Therefore, locomotion is also thought to be reliant on quadrupedal paddling.

=== Teeth ===
Ichthyolestes exhibits heterodont and diphyodont dentition with cusped cheek teeth. The upper second molar has pointed cusps with a high narrow paracone and a lower connate metacone behind it. The molars are also relatively labio-lingually compressed with serrated crests along the labial cusps.

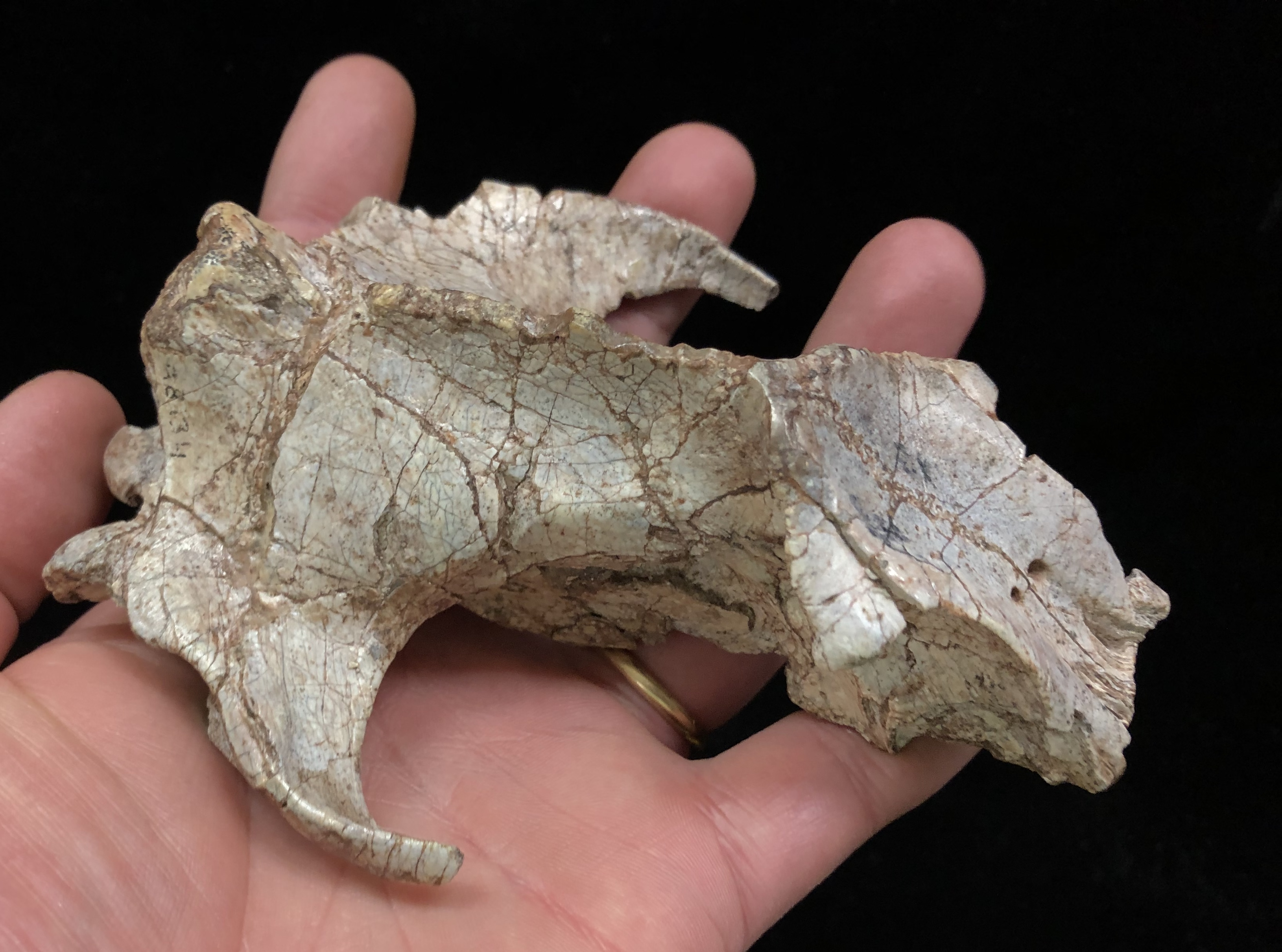
Braincase and orbital region an Ichthyolestes pinfoldi skull (HGSP 98134)

=== Cranial ===
Ichthyolestes has dorsally oriented eyes and a narrow skull, which is smaller than the skulls of both Pakicetus and Nalacetus. Like other pakicetids, Ichthyolestes lacks a supraorbital shield; however, there is some variation in supraorbital morphology between the three genera. The supraorbital region of Ichthyolestes and Pakicetus is cup-like and cradles the dorsal portion of the eye. Ichthyolestes also has a weaker incisure on the dorsal side of the supraorbital region compared to Pakicetus.

All three pakicetid taxa largely retained the peripheral ear morphology of terrestrial mammals, but likely used bone conducting mechanisms when hearing underwater. The tympanic bulla also differs between pakicetid taxa. The absolute size of Ichthyolestes tympanic bulla is smaller than either Pakicetus or Nalacetus; but when compared relative to their body size, the tympanic bulla of Ichthyolestes is proportionally larger than that of Pakicetus.

The semicircular canal system of the vestibular apparatus in the inner ear, which is involved in neural control of locomotion, is similar in size to that of Eocene artiodactyls. They do not show the size reduction as seen in other pakicetids and Eocene cetaceans like Remingtonocetus, Indocetus and Dorudon, which have canal sizes within the upper range of modern cetaceans. This suggests that Ichthyolestes had not fully invaded aquatic ecosystems and still remained somewhat terrestrial.

=== Postcranial ===
Although Ichthyolestes is the smallest pakicetid, some features are larger or more robust than Nalacetus, such as the astragalus, calcaneus and pelvis. Ichthyolestes also has proportionally longer lumbar and caudal vertebrae relative to its shorter limb segments.

Ichthyolestes also has long digits and strong post-thoracic vertebrae. The sacrum is composed of four elongate vertebrae with complete fusion, except for the spinous processes of S2 to S4 which are columnar with smooth ventral faces. The lumbar vertebrae are narrower and shallower to Pakicetus and Nalacetus. Although still relatively large compared to other related taxa, the atlas vertebrae of Ichthyolestes is smaller and more gracile than Pakicetus or Nalacetus, and the neural canal is disproportionately large.

== Terrestrial or semi-aquatic locomotion ==
The astragalus bone, which is present in the ankle of artiodactyls and archaic whales that retained feet, has similar dimensions in both Eocene artiodactyls and Ichthyolestes. In addition to lending evidence to the theory of a direct relationship between artiodactyls and cetaceans, this knowledge has led to two competing hypotheses about the locomotion of Ichthyolestes and other pakicetids. The first states that Ichthyolestes and Pakicetus were terrestrial and cursorial, implying that aquatic locomotor adaptation occurred after the origin of Cetacea. The second states that Ichthyolestes and Pakicetus were already semi-aquatic and cetaceans originated from an earlier unknown Eocene artiodactyl, such as Elomeryx or Indohyus, implying that aquatic locomotor adaptations occurred before or during the origin of Cetacea.

Although the postcranial anatomy of Ichthyolestes is similar to that of Eocene artiodactyls and implies cursoriality, the assessment of bone morphology and microstructure indicate that they, and other pakicetids, were semi-aquatic like protocetids. Hypermineralization occurs in all regions of the skeleton; in particular, the long bones and ribs had small or absent marrow cavities due to the thick cortices which developed. Hypermineralization of load-bearing skeletal elements put Ichthyolestes at an increased risk of fractures during prolonged terrestrial loading and this risk increased with velocity, implying that terrestriality was limited. Additionally, the dense skeletons may have allowed bottom-walking or wading in shallow pools as it would counteract buoyancy created by inflated lungs and fur-trapped air. Therefore, the retention of an artiodactyl-like astragalus does not signify full terrestriality or cursoriality in Ichthyolestes.

== Paleoecology ==
Fossil findings indicate Ichthyolestes shared habitat with its relatives Pakicetus and Nalacetus. Their fossils are usually found around river channel deposits, not marine deposits or fauna. The regions around northern Pakistan and northwest India, where fossils have been recovered, are thought to have been an arid environment with ephemeral streams and moderately developed floodplains. Ichthyolestes, therefore, had an affinity for water and were either terrestrial or semi-aquatic. The fluvial facies of the lower Kuldana Formation represent shallow tropical riverine complexes and were likely habitats for the initial stages of transition into water.

== See also ==
- Pakicetus
- Nalacetus
- Pakicetidae
- Evolution of cetaceans
- Eocene

== External Sources ==
Ichthyolestes in the Paleobiology Database. Retrieved June 2013.
