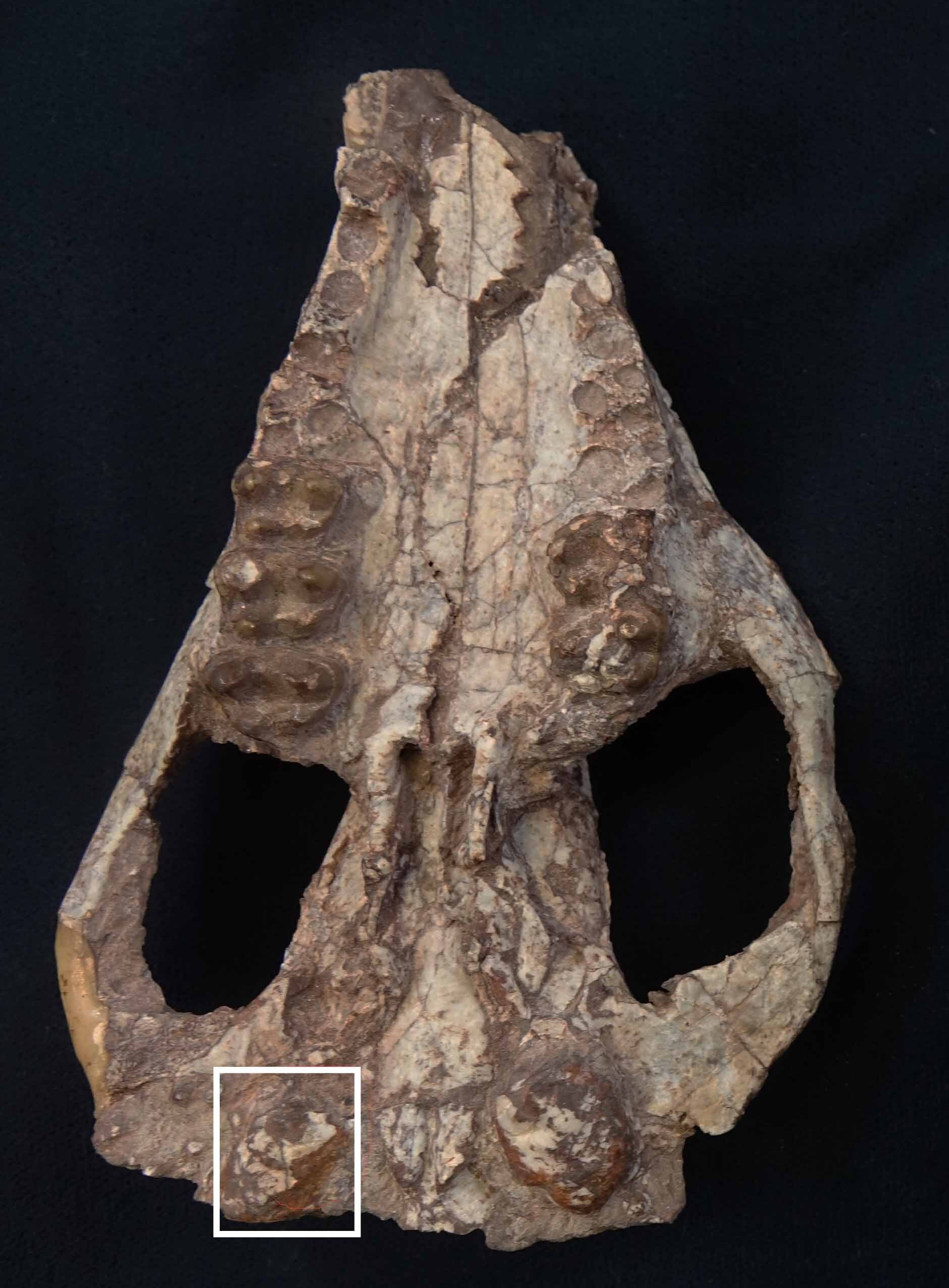
- Bottom-up view of Indohyus skull showing auditory bullae

Scientific classification
- Kingdom: Animalia
- Phylum: Chordata
- Class: Mammalia
- Order: Artiodactyla
- Family: †Raoellidae
- Genus: †Indohyus; Rao, 1971
- Species: †I. indirae

Binomial name
- †Indohyus indirae Rao, 1971

Synonyms
- †Raoella dograi Sahni & Khare, 1971

= Indohyus =

Indohyus Temporal range: Eocene (Lutetian), 48.7–45.4 Ma

Genus of extinct mammal

Indohyus (meaning "Indian pig", from Greek ινδός, indos, meaning 'Indian' and ὗς, hus, meaning 'pig' or 'swine') is an extinct genus of raoellid artiodactyl known from Eocene fossils in Asia. The fossils were discovered among rocks that had been collected in 1970 in Kashmir by the Indian geologist A. Ranga Rao, who found a few teeth and parts of a jawbone. He named the type and only species, Indohyus indirae, one year later.

In 2007, Hans Thewissen recognised an auditory bulla, a highly distinctive ear structure found only in cetaceans, in a broken skull collected from these rocks and given to him by Ranga Rao's widow. Later analysis of oxygen-18 values and the presence of osteosclerotic bones indicate that the chevrotain-like Indohyus was habitually aquatic.

About the size of a fox, this omnivorous pig-like creature shared some of the traits of whales and showed signs of adaptations to aquatic life. Their bones were similar to the bones of modern creatures such as the hippopotamus, and helped reduce buoyancy so that they could stay underwater. This suggests a survival strategy similar to that of the African mousedeer or water chevrotain which, when threatened by a bird of prey, dives into water and hides beneath the surface for up to four minutes. Indohyus was possibly sexually dimorphic, as significant intraspecific variation in the size of its maxillary canine teeth has been interpreted as evidence of such.

== Discovery ==
In 1970, Ranga Rao, of the Indian Directorate of Geology in the Oil & Natural Gas Corporation, discovered the fossils of Indohyus in the northern Indian province of Jammu and Kashmir. Ranga Rao subsequently published his findings in 1971, naming Indohyus indirae in the Journal of the Geological Society of India. The type species was named after Indira Gandhi. Ranga Rao also named another species: Indohyus kalakotensis.

Rao found the fossils in the Upper Subathu Formation, which is composed primarily of green shale, mudstone, and limestone. The formation has many different types of rocks, which indicates that the environment was transitioning from being marine to terrestrial. The Upper Subathu formation has been dated to be early-to-middle Lutetian in age (48.7–45.4 ma). The fossils were initially believed to be from the fully terrestrial Murree formation, which is above the Subathu formation and has more recent fossils. The holotype specimen, ONG/K/I, is a damaged left mandible with the third and fourth premolars and all of the molars. The alveolus of the second premolar is preserved, although the mandible forward of the alveolus is missing. The paratype specimen, ONG/K/2, consists of a left mandible with the first to third premolars. All other specimens initially found by Ranga Rao were small mandibular fragments with teeth.

=== Relationship to Cetacea ===
In 2007, when a student of Hans Thewissen accidentally broke a skull of an Indohyus, Thewissen noticed an inner ear bone with a thickened involcrum, a characteristic of cetaceans. He then investigated further, finding that Indohyus and cetaceans share many distinctive features not found in any other group of mammals: a thickened involcrum, osteosclerotic (thicker) bones, arrangement of incisors, and high crowns in posterior premolars. Following this, he published a study showing that Indohyus and Raoellidae (the family it belongs to) are the closest relatives of Cetacea. Thewissen chose to place Indohyus outside Cetacea because Indohyus was herbivorous while cetaceans are carnivorous. This specimen had been recovered from an Eocene-aged mudstone by Ranga Rao and given to Thewissen by Rao's widow.

== Classification ==
=== Internal classification ===
Indohyus was described in 1971 with two species: I. indirae and I. kalakotensis. In 1985, Kumar and Sahni moved I. kalakotensis to the genus Kunmunella, creating the new combination Kunmunella kalakotensis. Kumar and Sahni additionally synonymized Raoella with Indohyus indirae because the upper teeth of Raoella fit together with the lower teeth of Indohyus. In 1987, two years later, Thewissen, Gingerich and Russell proposed that Kunmunella was also synonymous with Indohyus, including K. kalakotensis. They believed Kunmunella was the same as Indohyus because many of the differences used to distinguish the genera were either caused by deformation while in the ground or, in their opinion, too minor to make a distinction between the two genera. Thewissen, Gingerich and Russell also coined the new species Indohyus major, based on fossils recovered from Pakistan. In 2001, Thewissen, Williams and Hussain once again supported a distinct Kunmunella, due to differences in the shape of the second and third molars. In 2020, Kunmunella, in addition to Metkatius and Haqueina were synonymized with Indohyus by Thewissen, Nanda and Bajpai because of a lack of distinguishing features between the different raoellid genera. This was contested only a year later by Rana and colleagues; who separated all raoellid genera aside from Raoella from Indohyus after running a phylogenetic analysis in their description of the raoellid Rajouria. This result was supported by an earlier study, in which Indohyus major was more closely related to Khirtharia based on fossil material found in China. After many new remains of Metkatius were found in 2024, Metkatius was definitively separated from Indohyus due to newly documented differences in their teeth.

=== External classification ===
When Indohyus was named, it was tentatively placed within Choeropotamidae, although it is now considered a member of Raoellidae. Raoellidae was named after Ranga Rao, and published by Ashok Sahni in 1981. At the time, the family included the genera Khirtharia, Kunmunella and Raoella. In 1985, Kumar and Sahni found Raoella to be synonymous with Indohyus, placing the latter within Raoellidae. Raoellidae was first defined as a group of long-snouted artiodactyls with bunolophodont teeth (bumpy with some ridges) and upper molars with a small paraconule and posterior lobe. Though raoellids were already thought to be artiodactyls, this was definitively proven in 1990 when a raoellid astragalus, an ankle bone, was found with a "double-pulley" mechanism, which is found only in artiodactyls.

Historically, Raoellidae was placed in the superfamily Dichobunoidea, a paraphyletic (including a common ancestor but not all descendants) group of basal artiodactyls. In 2004, Raoellidae was moved to Suiformes, and thought to be a group of stem-pigs. Then, in 2007, remains of Indohyus were reexamined. The fossils had features characteristic of whales, leading Indohyus, and thus Raoellidae, to be reclassified as early Cetaceamorphs. Their likely herbivorous to omnivorous diet differentiated them from the more derived pakicetids, and prevented a classification as 'true' cetaceans. Raoellids are known primarily from northern India and Pakistan, which was a freshwater swamp at the time. However, a fossil tooth from China was reexamined in 2011 and found to belong to Khirtharia, a raoellid. Therefore, while Raoellidae is primarily from the Indian subcontinent, some members of the group migrated to Eastern Asia.

Below is a cladogram of the internal relationships of Raoellidae based on the phylogenetic analysis conducted by Rana and colleagues in 2021, which returned similar results to a previous phylogenetic analysis conducted by Orliac and Ducrocq in 2012. Also depicted is a cladogram that shows the relationship of Indohyus to extinct and extant cetacean groups.

- Raoellidae
  - Rajouria
  - - Kunmunella
    - Indohyus
    - - Metkatius
      - Khirtharia

- - †Indohyus
  - Cetacea
    - †Pakicetidae
    - - †Ambulocetidae
      - - †Remingtonocetidae
        - - †Rodhocetus
          - - †Dorudon
            - - †Basilosaurus
              - Neoceti
                - Mysticeti (baleen whales)
                - Odontoceti (toothed whales)

== Description ==
While no comprehensive size estimate has been completed, Indohyus is generally agreed to be around the size of a fox or a large cat. Indohyus indirae is an average-sized raoellid, although the species Khirtharia major, which may be a member of Indohyus, is twice the size of I. indirae. Indohyus, and likely all other raoellids, have thickened bones. Denser bones are characteristic of aquatic and semiaquatic animals, such as hippopotamuses and whales, because it counteracts the buoyancy of their lungs and thus enables the organism to maintain a neutral buoyancy more efficient for underwater locomotion. Indohyus also has a thickened involcrum, a part of the inner ear, which is a diagnostic feature of cetaceans and also an aquatic adaptation. In terms of dentition, Indohyus is closest to Kunmunella, which has repeatedly been synonymized with Indohyus. They are both distinguished by bunolophodont dentition (bumpy with some ridges), as opposed to the other raoellids, which have a hyperbunodont dentition (very bumpy).

=== Skull ===
While a nearly complete skull of Indohyus has been found, it is highly deformed from geological pressure; the skull is squished dorsoventrally (top to bottom). Therefore, the exact height, and thus volume, of the brain case is unknown. The vermis of the cerebellum is the highest point of the brain. The olfactory bulb and peduncles compose approximately a third of the 7.4-centimeter-long brain. This trait is similar to early cetaceans. Generally, the brain of Indohyus was relatively basal, and was much more similar to dichobunids (a group of related, basal artiodactyls) than cetaceans.

The snout of Indohyus is unusually long for an artiodactyl, which is similar to Khirtharia and other raoellids. The total size of the skull is about twice that of the skull of K. inflata. Although the premaxilla (the bone of the tip of the skull) is not fully preserved, combining measurements from different specimens shows that the length from the tip of the snout to the back of the canine teeth is about a quarter of the total skull length, which is significantly larger than in dichobunids. The nasal bone is likewise long and slender, with the foremost portion missing. This proportionately long snout more closely resembles early cetaceans. The long premaxilla may be related to feeding, as in modern artiodactyls.

While Indohyus was an herbivore, its premolars and tooth wear patterns resemble those of cetaceans, especially Pakicetus. Unlike the dorsally facing eyes of pakicetids, Indohyus has laterally (sideways) facing eyes, similar to modern terrestrial artiodactyls. Indohyus has a thickened medial bullar wall, also called an involcrum, which is a diagnostic feature of cetaceans. The purpose of the thickened bullar wall is better bone-conducted hearing, which is usually found in aquatic species. The maxilla makes up most of the palate, and is narrowest over the second premolar. On the palate, the junction between the maxilla and palatine bones extends forwards from the palatal edge. The junctures on either side of the palate converge at the third premolar. The lacrimal bone is square, although the bone is generally poorly preserved. The frontal bone, which is concave, slightly overhangs the lacrimal. The jugal bone, also called the zygomatic arch, forms most of the bottom side of the orbital ring. It narrows going backwards and terminates just forward of the mandibular fossa (the joint between the jaw and skull). The maximum width between the two jugal arches is 7.2 centimeters. Some of the bones of the skull were osteosclerotic (thickened), similar to its limbs, which is likely an adaptation for being semi-aquatic.

=== Ribs and vertebrae ===
The atlas is short and wide. In Indohyus and other basal artiodactyls, the transverse process is thin; pakicetids have thick transverse processes. The bottom side of the transverse processes of both Indohyus and Pakicetus is very concave. The upper arch of the atlas is longer than the lower arch in both Indohyus and Pakicetus. The atlas is 4.2 centimeters wide and 1.1 centimeters tall. While inference from relatives points to Indohyus having a total of seven cervical vertebrae, only the third, fourth, fifth, and seventh are preserved. The third cervical has a long dorsal arch with a longitudinal crest that bears a spinous process. The fourth cervical is smaller than the fifth and seventh. It is 0.9 centimeters long and 2.8 centimeters wide. The fifth cervical vertebra preserves small processes and is proportionally more gracile than in Pakicetus. It is 1.7 centimeters long, 3.6 centimeters wide, and 3 centimeters tall. The seventh vertebra lacks a transverse foramen. The spinal process is vertical. It is 0.9 centimeters long, 2.5 centimeters wide and 2.7 centimeters tall.

The first few thoracic (back) vertebrae have tall and slender processes, which are more pronounced in early cetaceans like Pakicetus. In pakicetids and Indohyus, the backwards-facing articular surfaces point backwards and sideways. The vertebral body in Indohyus is elliptical, while Pakicetus has a triangular one. The first few thoracic vertebrae are roughly 0.9 centimeters long, 3 centimeters wide, and 4.3 centimeters tall. The middle thoracic vertebrae have higher spinal processes than the first. They have a keel on their bottom side. The last few thoracic vertebrae have short and triangular spinal processes angled backwards. The backwards-facing articular surfaces are cylindrical. The last few thoracic vertebrae are about 2.5 centimeters long, 0.8 centimeters wide, and 2.8 centimeters tall. The ribs, which attach to the thoracic vertebrae, of Indohyus are thinner and much more gracile compared to the thickened (pachyostotic) ribs of Pakicetus. This indicates that Indohyus was less specialized for an aquatic lifestyle compared to Pakicetus.

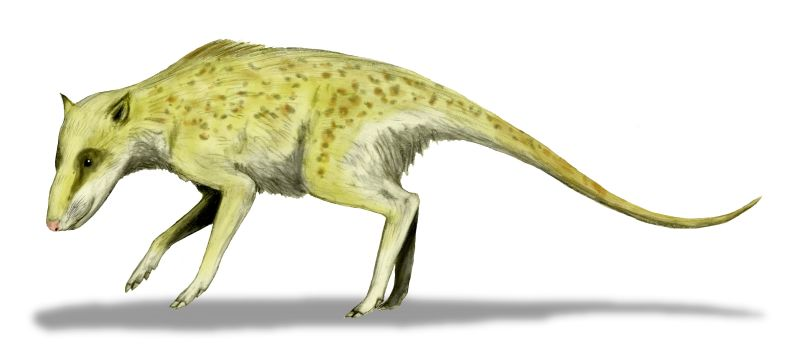
Life restoration of relative Khirtharia major, originally thought to have been a species of Indohyus

The lumbar vertebrae of Indohyus are long, with thin spinous processes. The forward-most lumbar vertebrae are long, with shorter spinous processes, while the rearmost vertebrae have taller and longer spinal processes. Indohyus has three sacral vertebrae, which have spinous processes that are fused at the base. The last two vertebrae have small, egg-shaped facets facing backwards and sideways, which make the intermediate sacral crest. The sacral length is roughly the same size in Indohyus and early whales like pakicetids. The caudal vertebrae decrease in size going backwards. The processes on the caudal vertebrae are thin and small. The cranial articular processes (bony projections on the front side of the vertebral arch) of Indohyus and pakicetids face towards the middle of the body. The last few caudal vertebrae are smaller, with relatively smaller processes. The middle tail vertebrae are 3.3 centimeters long, 2.7 centimeters wide, and 1.5 centimeters tall. The last tail vertebrae are 2.6 centimeters long, 1.1 centimeters wide, and 0.6 centimeters high.

=== Limbs and girdles ===
Unlike modern cetaceans, Indohyus had functional legs that could support the animal's body weight on land. The radius is elliptical, with a depression running from the beginning to the end of it used for the attachment of manus (hand) muscles. The top of the radius is concave to provide space for muscles in both Indohyus and Pakicetus. The ulna is thin and separate from the radius. Like the radius, the top of the ulna is concave. The bottom of the ulna is not preserved in any specimen of Indohyus. The ulna is generally more robust in pakicetids and later cetaceans. The cortical (hard, outer) layer of the limb bones is very thick (osteosclerosis), although not as thick as in Pakicetus. Osteosclerosis is a characteristic of aquatic and semi-aquatic animals, so Indohyus is likely semi aquatic, but less so than is Pakicetus. The metacarpals of Indohyus are shorter and wider than the metatarsals. The metacarpals in Indohyus and Pakicetus are unfused, similar to cetaceans but different from terrestrial artiodactyls. In Indohyus, the first metacarpal is the shortest. The second and fifth metacarpals are not preserved. The third and fourth metacarpals are robust in both Indohyus and Pakicetus. The metacarpal widens further from the wrist, with a relatively small head, unlike pakicetids. Only the proximal phalanges (the bone at the base of the finger) is preserved for the middle three fingers. The fingers of Indohyus are similar to other early artiodactyls and thinner than Pakicetus. The intermediate phalanges (the bone in the middle of the finger) are preserved for all digits except the fifth (little finger). They are conical and shorter than the proximal phalanges. The intermediate phalanx of the thumb is smaller and has a wider head compared to the center three fingers. The intermediate phalanges are narrower and more delicate compared to Pakicetus and other artiodactyls.

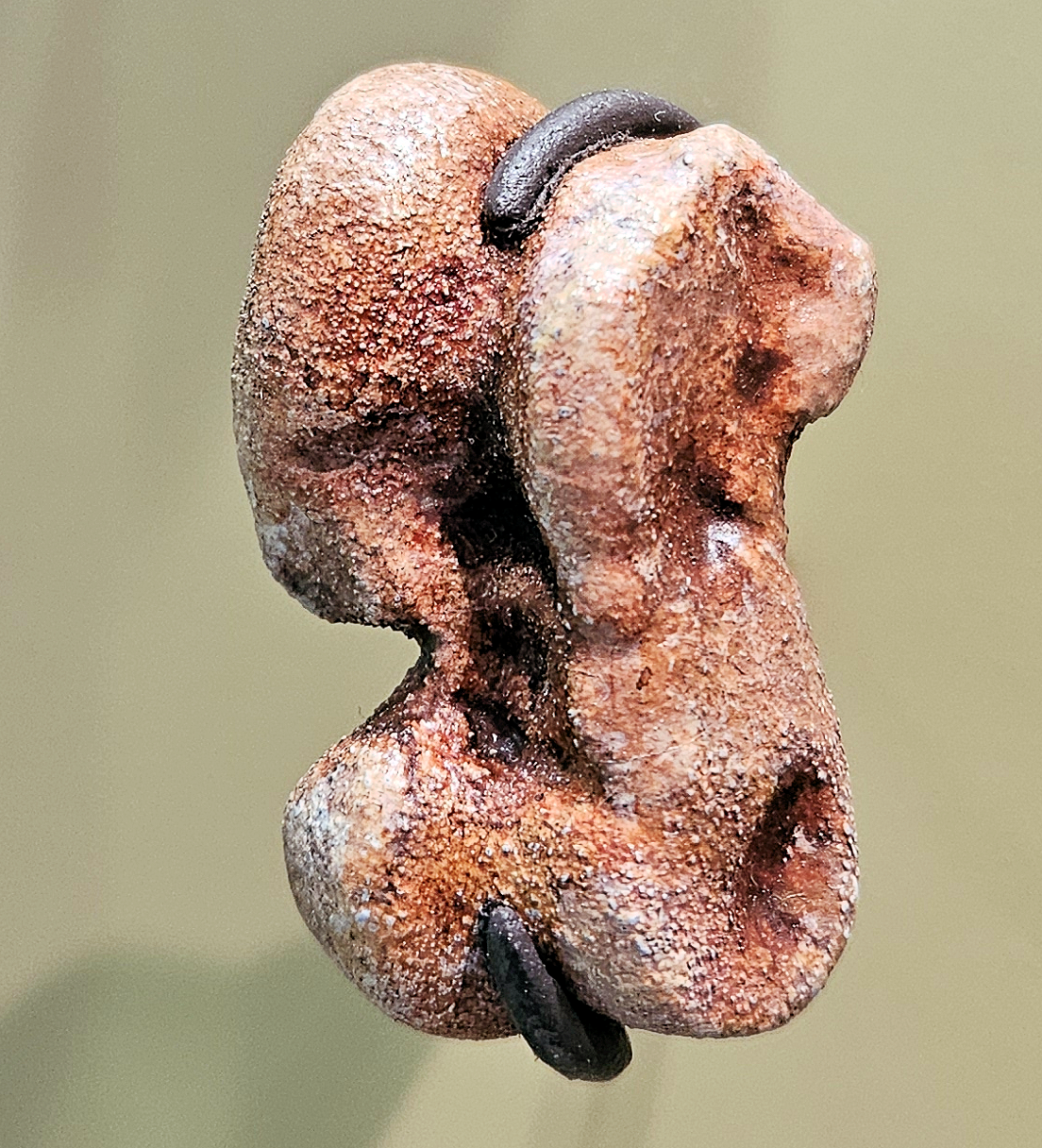
Astragalus of Pakicetus, showing the double-pulley mechanism

The head of the femur is roughly oval-shaped, wider horizontally, as in Pakicetus. The greater trochanter, a muscle anchoring site, is large and extends towards the femoral head in both Indohyus and Pakicetus, although it is proportionately larger in Pakicetus. The greater trochanter is unsurprisingly larger than the lesser trochanter in both Indohyus and Pakicetus. The third trochanter projects a third way down the femur, and is smaller in Indohyus than in Pakicetus, but larger than in other basal artiodactyls. The femoral shaft is very thick and robust compared to other artiodactyls. The bottom end of the femur is also thicker than in other artiodactyls. The femur is 12 centimeters long and 1.2 centimeters wide except at the femoral head, where it is 1.5 centimeters wide. The tibia has a triangular cross section. The tibia is 1.3 centimeters wide. The fibula was slender and unfused to the tibia, similar to pakicetids. As in all artiodactyls, the astragalus resembles a pulley. The astragalus is 1.1 centimeters wide and 2 centimeters long. The metatarsals are larger than the metacarpals and are unfused, like in Pakicetus and the metacarpals. The metatarsals are thinner and smaller than in Pakicetus. The toes of Indohyus are larger than their fingers. The toes are also thinner and smaller than in Pakicetus, although they are poorly preserved.

The joint where the humerus attaches to the scapula is triangular in Indohyus, unlike the rounded versions in other animals. The coracoid process is bulbous instead of hook-shaped, as in other artiodactyls. In both Indohyus and Pakicetus, a large spine runs down the scapula with a large projection. The pelvis somewhat resembles the pakicetid Nalacetus. The ilium is flat with a wide blade. The lower spine, which holds the rectus femoris muscle, is smaller than in pakicetids and similar to other small artiodactyls. The ischium of Indohyus and pakicetids is more robust than in other artiodactyls. The acetabulum is shallow and longer horizontally. There are two different forms of pelvis in Indohyus, which is evidence of sexual dimorphism, considering the two forms of teeth in the animal.

== Paleobiology ==
The oxygen-18 isotopes in Indohyus's teeth suggest that Indohyus would have spent much of its life in the water either for protection or for food. Despite spending much of its time in the water, it was not an effective swimmer; its limbs were thin and its heavy bones weighed it down. Instead, Indohyus used its thick bones to sink in water, where it would walk on the water floor. It would have, however, been able to effectively walk and run on land. Indohyus had an uncertain diet. It may be an herbivore, although it is unknown if it consumed aquatic or terrestrial plants. Alternatively, it was an omnivore, using its canines and incisors to grab marine invertebrates. Indohyus has an inner ear similar to cetaceans, which means it may have been adapted to hear underwater, although this is unlikely because the rest of the ear was similar to terrestrial mammals. Indohyus also probably was able to smell similar to most mammals, unlike cetaceans which are unable to smell (mammals cannot smell water). It may have been hunted by ambulocetids, a family of early crocodile whales. The earliest known ambulocetid (Gandakasia) is found in the formation immediately above Indohyus, so they may not have coexisted. Indohyus may have been sexually dimorphic, as there was a significant difference in pelvis form and canine size between specimens. However, the smaller canines may have belonged to the raoellid Rajouria.

=== Diet ===
Indohyus was probably a herbivorous animal with a diet similar to other early artiodactyls. It had bunolophodont molars similar to other artiodactyls, and slightly different to the more bunodont raoellids like Khirtharia and very different from pakicetids. These molars would have been specialized towards the consumption of plants. Indohyus had a long premaxilla (snout) which was related to feeding, similar to modern artiodactyls. The mandibular condyle (area of the jaw attaching to the back of the skull) is situated above the teeth, which is common in herbivorous animals; carnivores usually have a lower mandibular condyle to increase bite force. Indohyus has lightly worn canines and incisors with relatively thin enamel, meaning it did not use its forward teeth for strong bites. Carbon-13 isotope data indicates that Indohyus did not feed on ocean animals; it has the same carbon-13 levels as other artiodactyls. Instead, Indohyus consumed vegetation, although it is unknown if it would consume aquatic plants or come on land to eat terrestrial plants (like hippos). However, Indohyus had tooth wear patterns different from other artiodactyls, so it may have eaten plants with a different consistency or texture.

Alternatively, Indohyus was omnivorous and fed primarily on aquatic invertebrates living in riverbeds. Indohyus, despite having very different molars, showed tooth wear very similar to archaeocetes. Indohyus's weak bite (from its high mandibular condyle) and thin enamel, coupled with the limited abrasion on the teeth, suggest Indohyus used its canines for shallow, slashing bites on aquatic invertebrates. This would have been aided by the shape of the incisors; the lower incisors are pointed, while the upper incisors are canine-shaped, and both are pointed backwards. Thus, they would have been effective at grasping small prey. The fourth premolar is large, similar to pakicetids and early cetaceans. Overall, the diet of Indohyus is relatively unknown; it may have either eaten plants, although it is unknown whether or not the plants were aquatic, or it was an omnivore and ate aquatic invertebrates using its grasping canines and incisors.

=== Locomotion ===
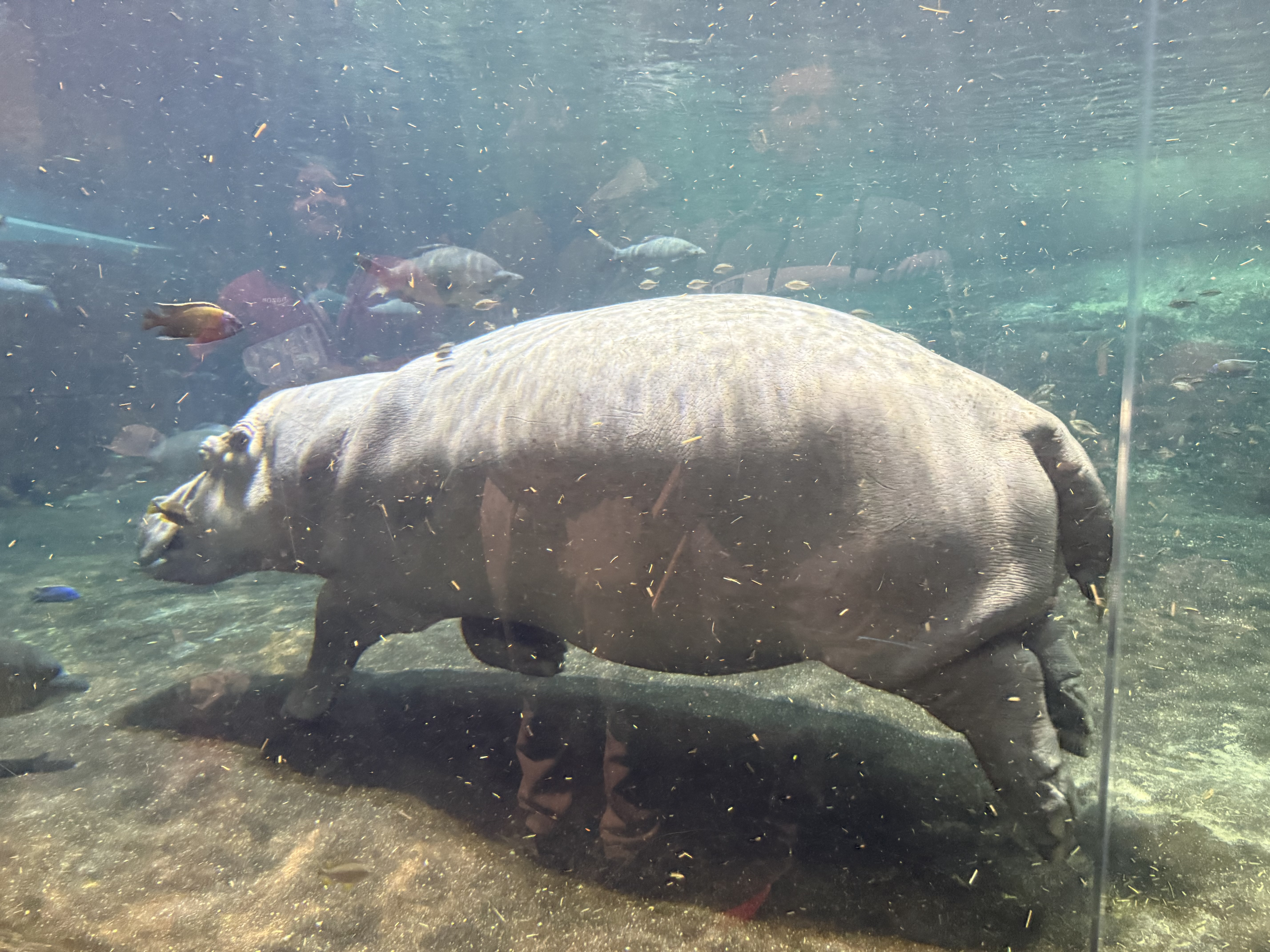
A hippopotamus using its dense bones to sink to the bottom of a lake

Indohyus, similar to pakicetids but unlike other cetaceans, was probably not an effective swimmer. Indohyus and Pakicetus were digitigrade (walking with only their toes on the ground), like cats and dogs. Since the toe bones were unfused, Indohyus could spread its toes to increase surface area and walk on soft ground such as mud. While Indohyus had some semiaquatic adaptations, it is unlikely it utilized more advanced swimming methods, such as pelvic paddling, because Indohyus did not have long fingers, lacked webbing, had small, gracile limbs, and had heavy bones that hindered its ability to swim quickly. Instead, it is more likely that Indohyus used its heavy bones to weigh itself down so it could walk on the bottom of rivers or lakes, similar to the modern day hippopotamus. Indohyus has low oxygen-18 values, which means it was likely habitually aquatic, spending much of its time in the water. Indohyus's high bone densities also indicate it much of its time in the water, as animals which only go to water to flee from predators (such as the mousedeer) have normal bone densities. While Indohyus had bone densities greater than terrestrial mammals in some of its bones, it had bone densities less than pakicetids (Pakicetus, Ichthyolestes, Nalacetus) and other early archaeocetes. For these reasons, Indohyus was a transitional form from terrestrial artiodactyls to early whales.

Indohyus, like other artiodactyls, was able to effectively walk and run on land. It had a stiff spine and long gracile limbs adapted for terrestrial locomotion. Indohyus's joints had movement restricted to motion suitable for terrestrial movement; its legs would not have been able to be turned sideways, unlike cetaceans. The long limbs of Indohyus would have enabled it to quickly and efficiently run. Unlike pakicetids, Indohyus had relatively gracile vertebrae (indicating smaller muscles) with a limited range of motion, which means that its spine would not have been used for swimming, and instead was adapted for walking. Indohyus, like most mammals, would have held its legs directly under its body, which is an adaptation for land-based movement lost in derived cetaceans. However, the osteosclerotic bones of Indohyus would have weighed it down and slightly impeded terrestrial locomotion.

== Paleoecology ==
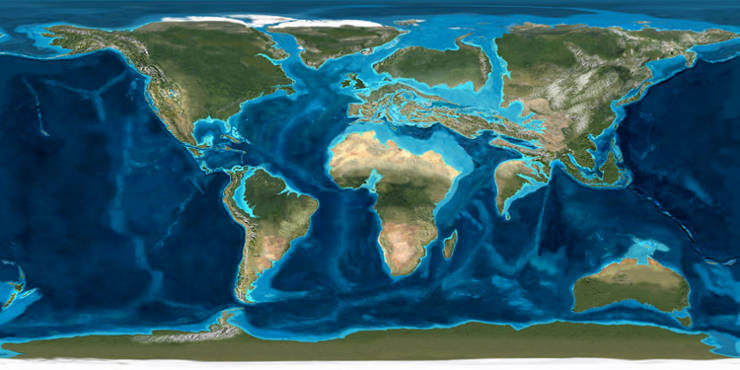
Earth 50 million years ago, near when Indohyus was alive

At the time Indohyus was discovered, the age of the Subathu group was unknown. Recently, the upper Subathu Formation has been dated to 48 million years old, which places it in the Lutetian stage of the Eocene epoch. During the Eocene, the Indian subcontinent was an island just beginning its collision with Asia which would eventually lead to the uprising of the Himalayas. The Eocene had a greenhouse climate (no permanent ice sheets at the poles) as opposed to the icehouse climate of today, so, in general, areas were much warmer. The abundance of Eocene brown coal deposits preserving tropical biota on the Indian subcontinent indicates the proliferation of tropical rainforests in a hot climate. Mangroves seem to have commonly grown along the subcontinent's western margin in the Early Eocene but decreased nearing the Middle Eocene Climatic Optimum (a warming trend). The waters off the western coast seem to have featured upwelling and low oxygen.

The holotype of Indohyus was found in the Sindkhatuti locality (named after a nearby town) of the Kalakot area in the upper Subathu formation, although it was initially believed to be part of the Murree formation. Later remains were found in the Chorlakki locality in Pakistan, although Indohyus was much more common in the Kalakot locality. The Chorlakki locality was part of the Kuldana formation. The Subathu formation was primarily a shallow marine environment, with some terrestrial areas. The upper Subathu formation is composed of purple shale, grey-red ossiferous siltstone, shelly limestone and grey fossiliferous limestone. The holotype was found in maroon/grey shales.

In the Indian Subathu formation, Indohyus coexisted with the rodents Birbalomys and Chapattimys, the adapid primate Panobius, and the hyaenodontids Paratritemnodon, Forstercooperia and Schlosseria. The perissodactyls Indohyus coexisted with are the potential brontothere Mulkrajanops, the lophialetids Kalakota and Aulaxolophus, the helaletids Hyrachyus and Triplopus, and the anthracobunid Anthracobune. Indohyus coexisted with all other raoellids and the archaeocete Pakicetus at the Subathu formation. In the Kuldana formation, Indohyus also coexisted with the dichobunids Chorlakkia and Diacodexis, the brontothere Eotitanops, the anthracobunid Pilgrimella, and the archaeocetes Nalacetus and Ichthyolestes, although it did not coexist with lophialetids, helaletids and Mulkrajanops.

== See also ==
- Anatomical terms of location
- Evolution of cetaceans
- Glossary of mammalian dental topography
- Kalakocetus
- Protocetidae
