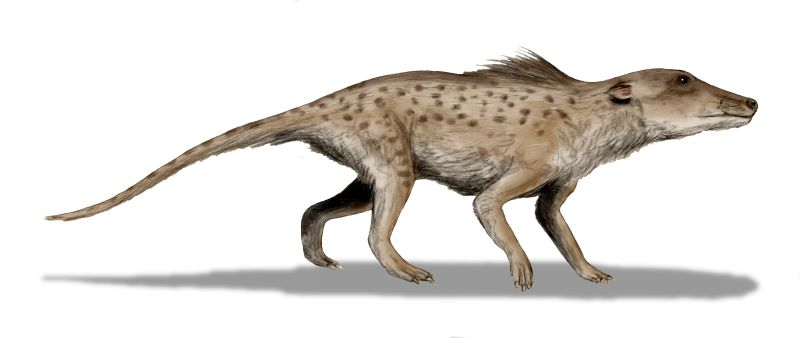
- Pakicetus

Scientific classification
- Kingdom: Animalia
- Phylum: Chordata
- Class: Mammalia
- Order: Artiodactyla
- Infraorder: Cetacea
- Family: †Pakicetidae; Thewissen, Madar & Hussain 1996

Genera
- Pakicetus; Nalacetus; Ichthyolestes

= Pakicetidae =

Pakicetidae Temporal range: Early Eocene, 50–45 Ma

Family of mammals

Pakicetidae ("Pakistani whales") is an extinct family of early whales that lived during the Early Eocene in northern South Asia. Unlike modern cetaceans, they had well-developed limbs and were capable of walking. The species included were fox to wolf-sized.

== Description ==
Richard Dehm and Therese zu Oettingen-Spielberg described the first pakicetid in 1958, Ichthyolestes, but at the time they did not recognize it as a cetacean, identifying it, instead, it as a fish-eating mesonychid. Robert West was the first to identify pakicetids as cetaceans in 1980 and, after discovering a braincase, Phillip Gingerich and Donald Russell described the genus Pakicetus in 1981. During the following two decades, more research resulted in additional pakicetid cranial material and by 2001 postcranial material for the family had been described. Though all parts of pakicetid postcrania are known, no complete skeleton from a single individual has been recovered. The pakicetid goldmine is the "H-GSP Locality 62" site in the Kala Chitta Hills where fossils from all three genera have been found. However, this site is so littered with bones that identifying bones from a single individual is impossible, and pakicetid skeletons are consequently composites of bones from several individuals.

Pakicetids have been found in or near river deposits in northern Pakistan and northwestern India, a region which was probably arid with only temporary streams when these animals lived there. No pakicetids have been found in marine deposits, and they were apparently terrestrial or freshwater animals. Their long limbs and small hands and feet also indicate they were poor swimmers. Their bones are heavy and compact and were probably used as ballast; they clearly indicate pakicetids were not fast runners in spite of their otherwise cursorial morphology. Most likely, pakicetids lived in or near bodies of freshwater and their diet could have included both land animals and aquatic organisms. During the Eocene, Pakistan was part of the Indian island-continent off the coastal region of the Eurasian land mass and therefore an ideal habitat for the evolution and diversification of the Pakicetids.

Pakicetids have many apomorphic traits (derived traits shared by several taxa) found in artiodactyls, including:	Traits linking pakicetids to cetaceans include:
small mandibular foramina and canals; elongated cervical vertebrae; long and gracile limbs featuring "double-pulleyed" astragalus in the ankle; long metapodials and; four fused sacral vertebrae	a pachyosteosclerotic (thick, heavy bone) auditory bulla with an involucrum and sigmoid process; cheek teeth adapted for shearing with reentrant grooves on the anterior surfaces; lower molars lacking trigonid and talonid basins and upper molars with very small trigon basins; incisors and canines aligned to the cheek teeth; narrow elongated postorbital (behind eyes) cranium

== Hearing ==
Pakicetid ears had an external auditory meatus and ear ossicles (i.e. incus, malleus, tympanic ring, etcetera) similar to those in living land mammals and most likely used normal land mammal hearing in air. In the pakicetid mandible, the mandibular foramen is small and comparable in size to those of extant land mammals and the acoustic mandibular fat pad characteristic of later whales was obviously not present. The lateral wall of the mandible is also relatively thick in pakicetids, further preventing sound transmission through the jaw. The tympanic bulla in pakicetid ears is similar to those in all cetaceans, with a relatively thin lateral wall and thickened medial part known as the involucrum. However, in contrast to later cetaceans, the tympanic bone makes contact with the periotic bone which is firmly attached to the skull leaving no space for isolating air sinuses, effectively preventing directional hearing in water. Pakicetids most likely used bone conduction for hearing in water.

== Locomotion ==
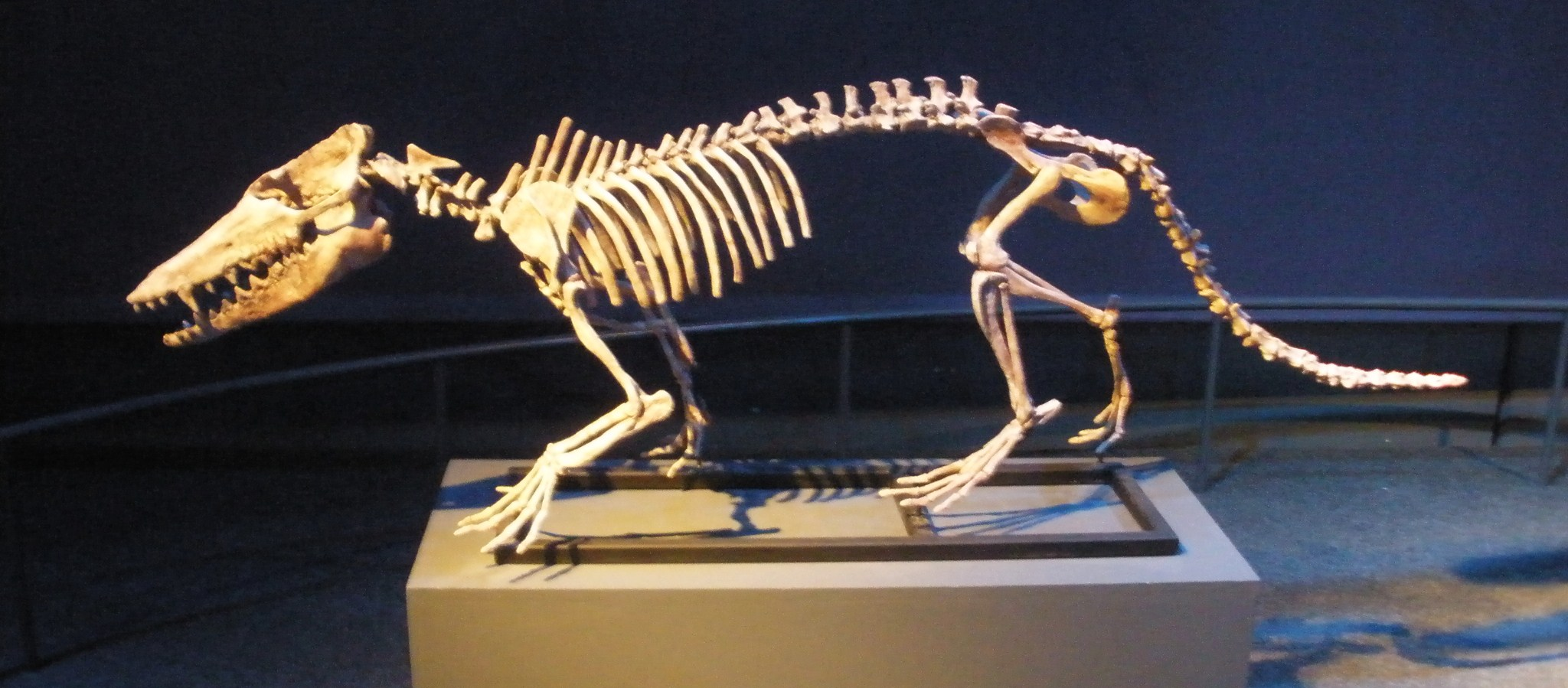
Pakicetus attocki

Interpretations of pakicetid habitat and locomotory behaviour varies considerably. In 2001, it was concluded by Thewissen et al. that "pakicetids were terrestrial mammals, no more amphibious than a tapir." According to them, none of the aquatic adaptations found in the oldest obligate aquatic cetaceans, basilosaurids and dorudontids, are present in pakicetids. Pakicetid cervical vertebrae are longer than in late Eocene whales, the thoracic vertebrae increase in size from the neck backwards, and the lumbar and caudal vertebrae are longer than in modern cetaceans (but still shorter than in some extinct cetaceans with undulating spines.) Motion in the spine of pakicetids was further reduced by the revolute zygapophyses (processes between the vertebrae) like in stiff-backed runners such as mesonychians. The sacral vertebrae are fused and the sacroiliac joints present like in land mammals and amphibious cetaceans.

Furthermore, according to Thewissen et al. (2001), the pakicetid scapulae have large supraspinous fossae with small acromions, in contrast to other cetaceans. The deltopectoral crests are absent in the long and slender humeri like in cursorial animals but unlike other Eocene cetaceans. Pakicetid elbows are rigid hinge joints like in running mammals and the forearms are not flattened like in truly aquatic cetaceans. In the pakicetid pelvis, the innominates are large and the ischia are longer than the ilia. The pakicetid tibiae are long with a short tibial crest. Hindlimb features that all more reminiscent of running and jumping animals than swimming animals.

Gingerich 2003 disagreed and got support from Madar 2007: postcranial morphology and microstructural features suggest that pakicetids were adapted to an aquatic lifestyle which included bottom wading, paddling, and undulatory swimming, but probably not sustained running. Isotopic evidence indicate Pakicetids spent a considerable part of their life in freshwater and probably ate freshwater prey. This view was further reiterated by Gingerich in a 2017 paper.

== Subtaxa ==
- Family Pakicetidae
  - Ichthyolestes (Dehm & Oettingen-Spielberg 1958)
    - Ichtyolestes pinfoldi (Dehm & Oettingen-Spielberg 1958)
  - Nalacetus (Thewissen & Hussain 1998)
    - Nalacetus ratimitus (Thewissen & Hussain 1998)
  - Pakicetus (Gingerich & Russell 1981)
    - Pakicetus inachus (Gingerich & Russell 1981)
    - Pakicetus attocki (West 1980)
    - Pakicetus calcis (Cooper, Thewissen & Hussain 2009)
    - Pakicetus chittas (Cooper, Thewissen & Hussain 2009)

== See also ==
- Archaeoceti
- Evolution of cetaceans
