= Evolution of cetaceans =

Species of the infraorder Cetacea

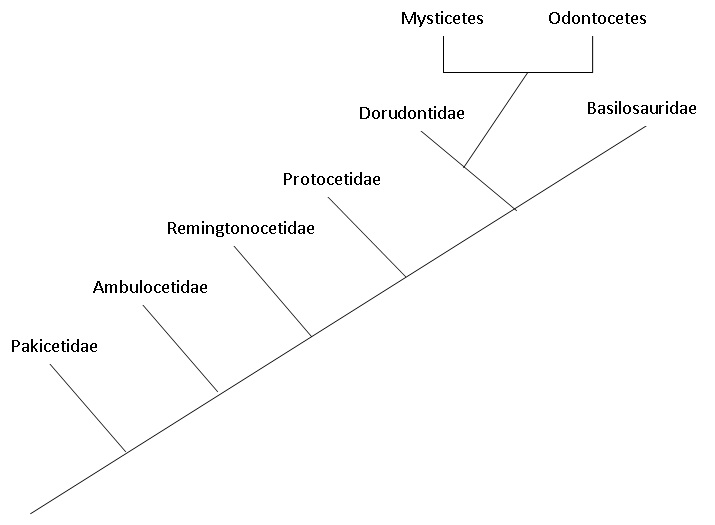
A phylogenetic tree showing the relationships among cetacean families.

The evolution of cetaceans is thought to have proceeded in modern day Pakistan during the Eocene epoch (56–34 mya), the second epoch of the Paleogene period of the present-extending Cenozoic Era. Specifically, cetaceans are thought to have transitioned from land to water at the tailend of the Paleocene–Eocene transition about 56 Mya, which was marked by increased global temperatures of 5.6°C, warming the earth’s oceans.

Cetaceans are fully aquatic mammals belonging to the order Artiodactyla. Molecular and morphological analyses suggest that they share a relatively recent closest common ancestor with hippopotamuses – their sister group, diverging about 55.5 Mya. Cetacea completely branched off from other artiodactyls around 50 mya. Research conducted in the late 1970s in Pakistan revealed several stages in the transition of cetaceans from land to sea. Being mammals, they surface to breathe air; they have five finger bones (even-toed) in their fins; they nurse their young; and, despite their fully aquatic life style, they retain many skeletal features from their terrestrial ungulata ancestors.

The two modern parvorders of cetaceans – Mysticeti (baleen whales) and Odontoceti (toothed whales) – are thought to have separated from each other around 28–33 mya in a second cetacean radiation, the first occurring with the archaeocetes. The adaptation of animal echolocation in toothed whales distinguishes them from fully aquatic archaeocetes and early baleen whales. The presence of baleen in baleen whales occurred gradually, with earlier varieties having very little baleen, and their size is linked to baleen dependence (and subsequent increase in filter feeding).

== Early evolution ==
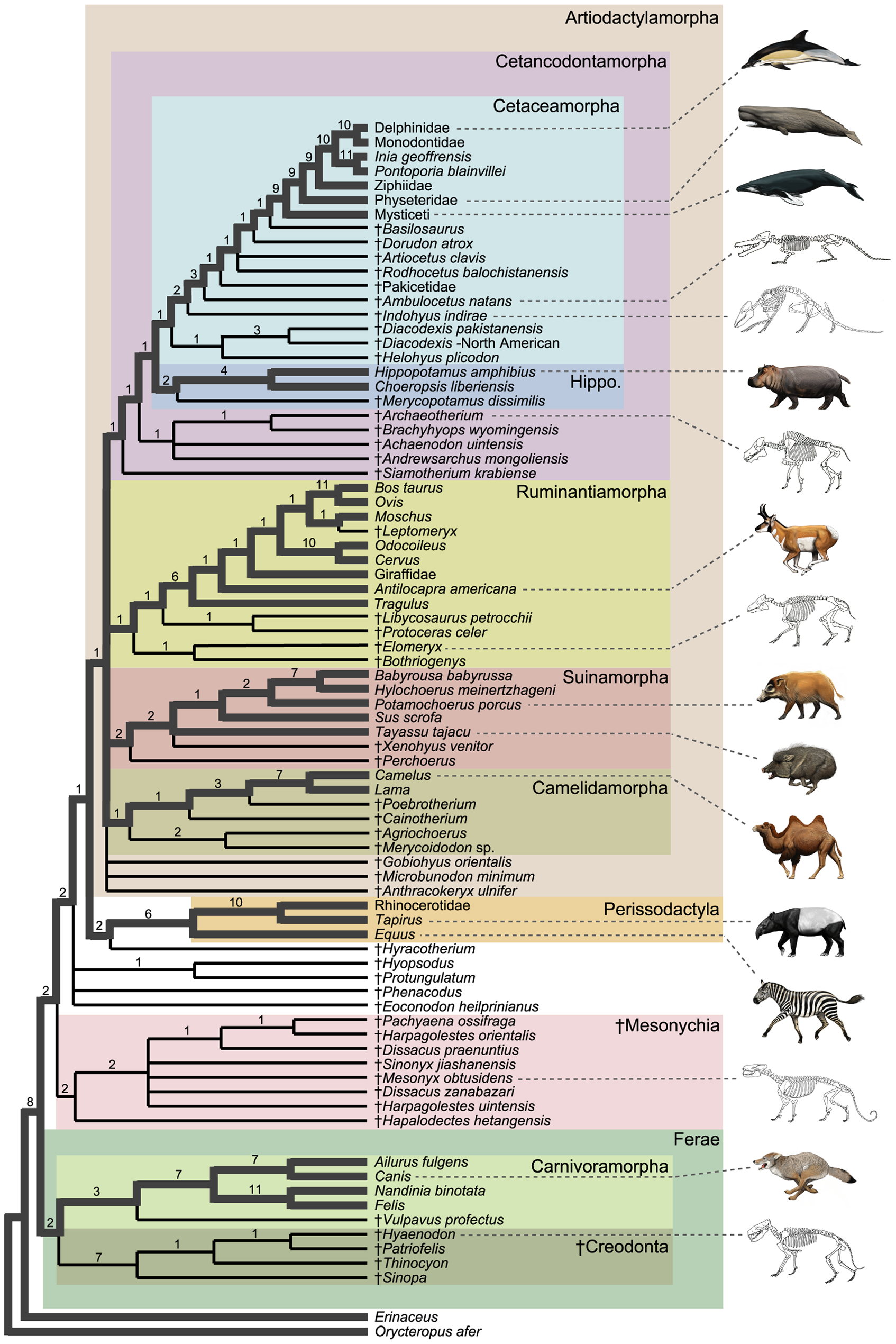
Cladogram showing the position of Cetacea within Artiodactylamorpha

Evolution of cetaceans

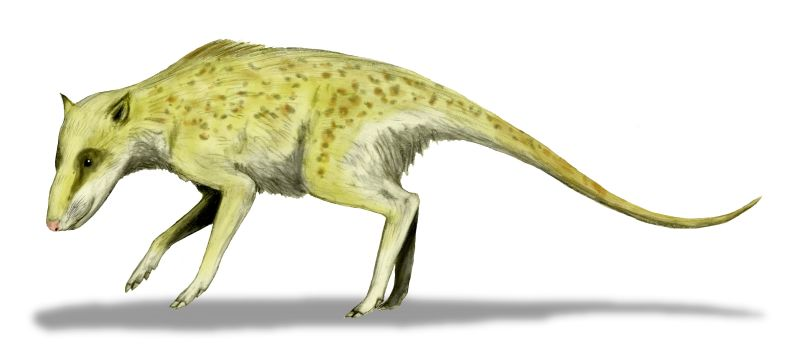
Indohyus (Raoellidae cca 49–48 Ma)

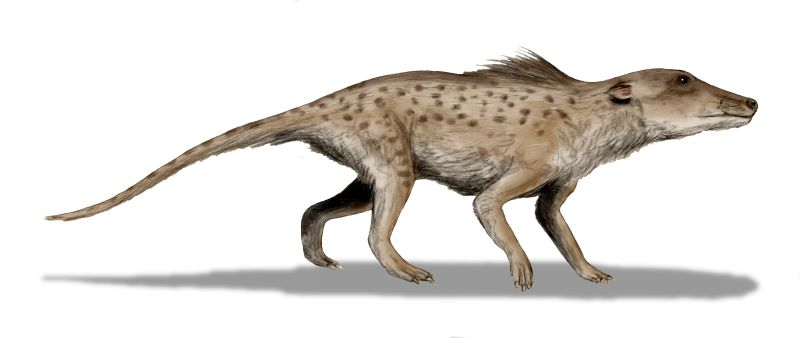
Pakicetus (Pakicetidae cca 49–48 Ma)

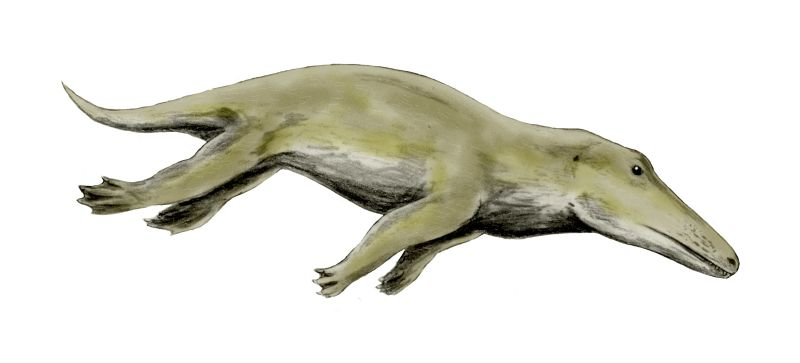
Ambulocetus (Ambulocetidae cca 49–48 Ma)

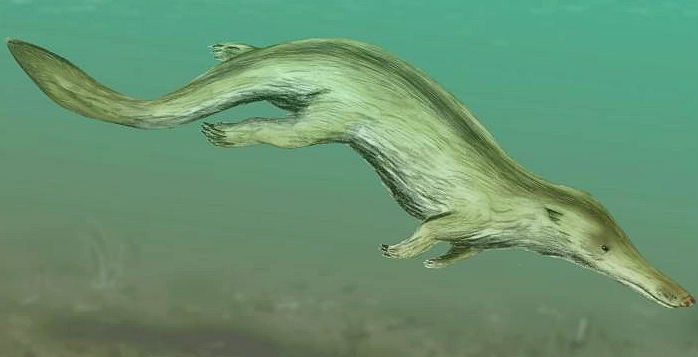
Kutchicetus (Remingtonocetidae cca 48 Ma)

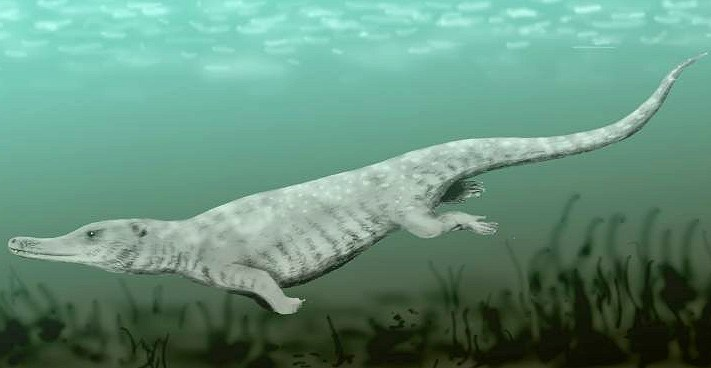
Remingtonocetus (Remingtonocetidae cca 48 Ma)

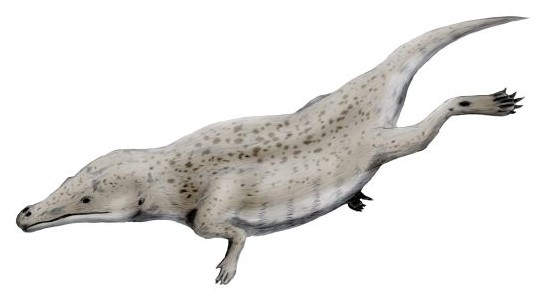
Maiacetus (Protocetidae cca 47.5 Ma)

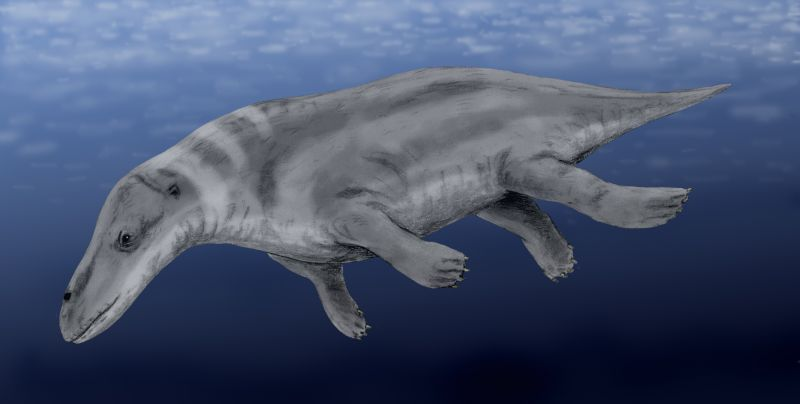
Rodhocetus (Protocetidae cca 45 Ma)

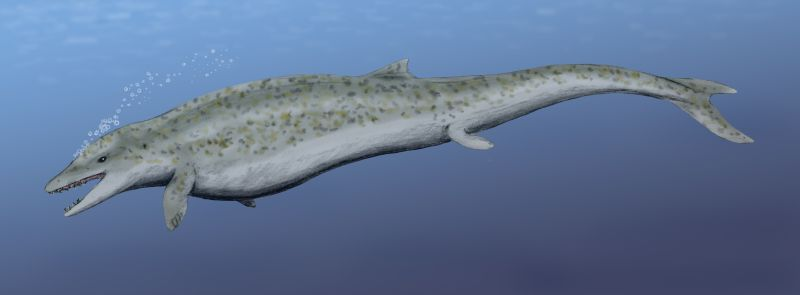
Dorudon (Basilosauridae cca 35 Ma)

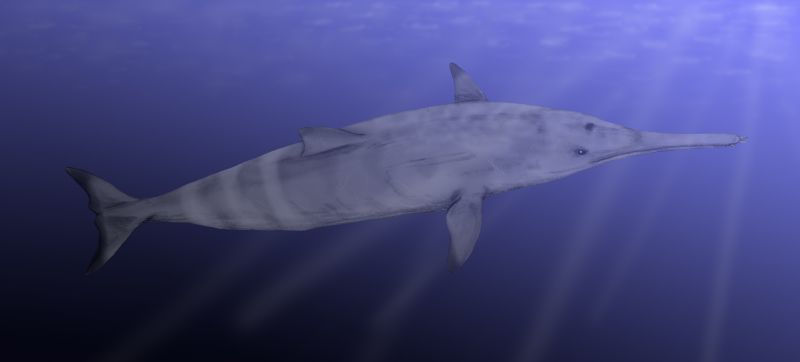
Squalodon (Squalodontidae, Odontoceti cca 25 Ma)

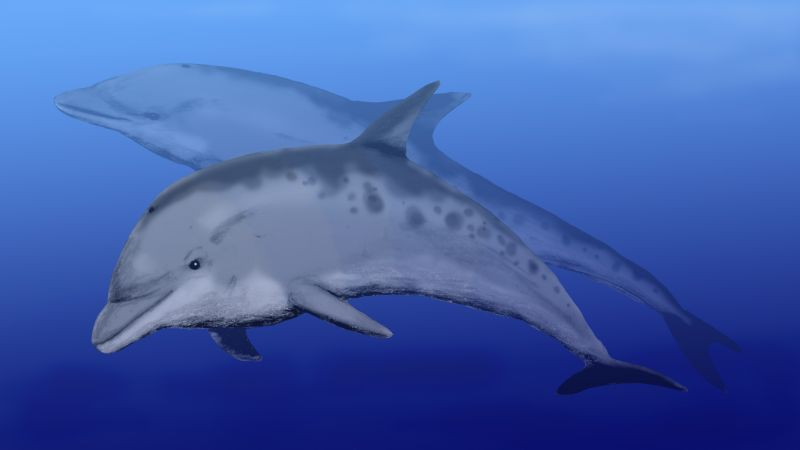
Kentriodon (Kentriodontidae. Odontoceti cca 20 Ma)

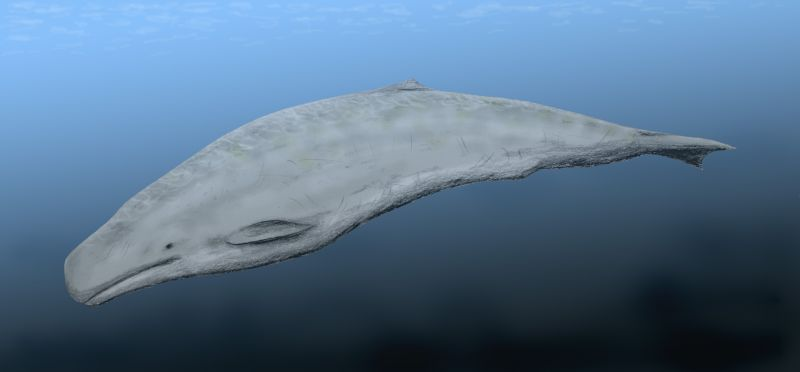
Aulophyseter (Physeteridae, Odontoceti cca 20 Ma)

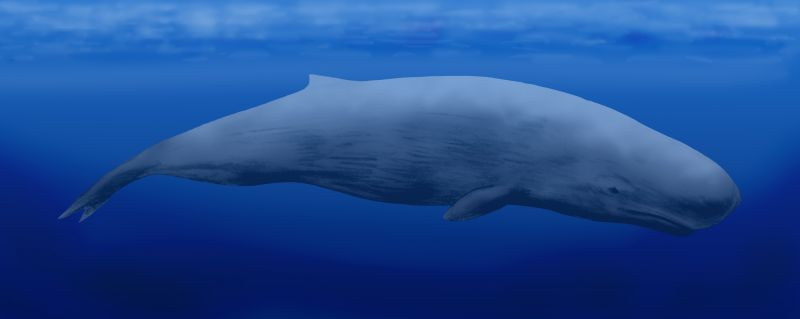
Brygmophyseter (Physeteridae, Odontoceti cca 15 Ma)

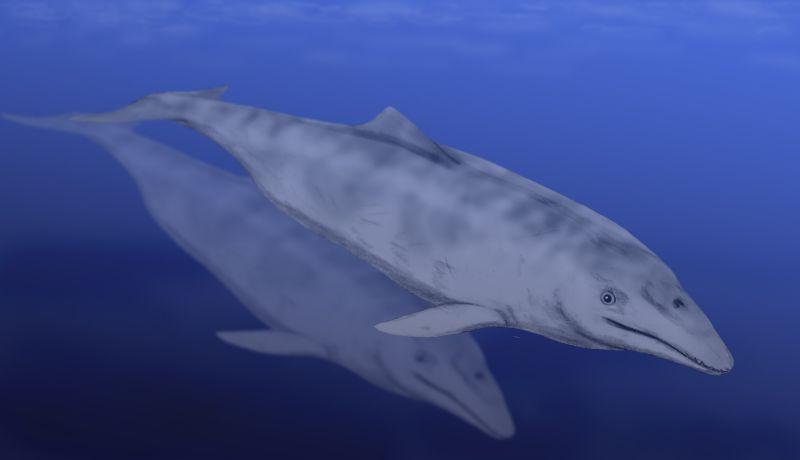
Aetiocetus (Aetiocetidae, Mysticeti cca 27 Ma)

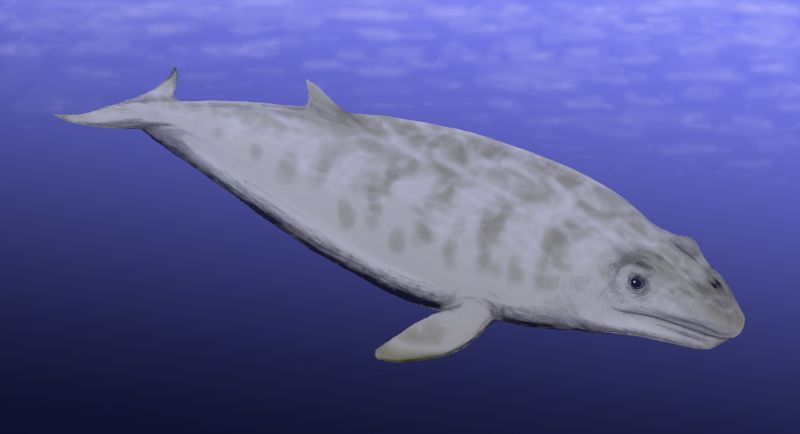
Janjucetus (Mammalodontidae, Mysticeti cca 25 Ma)

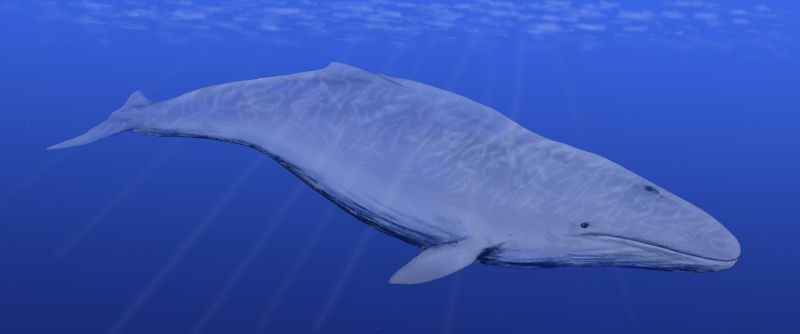
Cetotherium (Cetotheriidae, Mysticeti cca 18 Ma)

The aquatic lifestyle of cetaceans first began in the Indian subcontinent from even-toed ungulates 50 million years ago, with this initial stage lasting approximately 4-15 million years. Archaeoceti is an extinct parvorder of Cetacea containing ancient whales. The traditional hypothesis of cetacean evolution, first proposed by Van Valen in 1966, was that whales were related to the mesonychians, an extinct order of carnivorous ungulates (hoofed animals) that resembled wolves with hooves and were a sister group of the artiodactyls (even-toed ungulates). This hypothesis was proposed due to similarities between the unusual triangular teeth of the mesonychians and those of early whales. However, molecular phylogeny data indicates that whales are very closely related to the artiodactyls, with hippopotamuses as their closest living relative. Because of this observation, cetaceans and hippopotamuses are placed in the same suborder, Whippomorpha. Cetartiodactyla (formed from the words Cetacea and Artiodactyla) is a proposed name for an order that includes both cetaceans and artiodactyls. However, the earliest anthracotheres, the ancestors of hippos, do not appear in the fossil record until the Middle Eocene, millions of years after Pakicetus, whereas the first known whale ancestor appeared during the Early Eocene; this difference in timing implies that the two groups diverged well before the Eocene. Molecular analysis identifies artiodactyls as being very closely related to cetaceans, so mesonychians are probably an offshoot from Artiodactyla, and cetaceans did not derive directly from mesonychians, but the two groups may share a common ancestor.

The molecular data are supported by the discovery of Pakicetus, the earliest archaeocete. The skeletons of Pakicetus show that whales did not derive directly from mesonychians. Instead, they are artiodactyls that began to take to the water soon after artiodactyls split from mesonychians. Archaeocetes retained aspects of their mesonychian ancestry (such as the triangular teeth) which modern artiodactyls, and modern whales, have lost. The earliest ancestors of all hoofed mammals were probably at least partly carnivorous or scavengers, and today's artiodactyls and perissodactyls became herbivores later in their evolution. Whales, however, retained their carnivorous diet because prey was more available and they needed higher caloric content in order to live as marine endotherms (warm-blooded). Mesonychians also became specialized carnivores, but this was likely a disadvantage because large prey was uncommon. This may be why they were out-competed by better-adapted animals like the hyaenodontids and later Carnivora.

=== Raoellidae ===
Raoellidae (/reɪoʊˈɛlɪdeɪ/) is a family of extinct semiaquatic artiodactyls from the middle Eocene (about 48 million years ago) that were not cetaceans, but closely related to cetaceans. Raoellidae has been recovered as the family most closely related to Cetacea in multiple phylogenetic analyses. They are known primarily from northern India and Pakistan, although potential remains of the raoellid Khirtharia have been found in northern China. They are relatively small animals; on average, raoellids were the size of a red fox. However, Khirtharia major, at about twice the size of an average-sized raoellid, would have been approximately the size of a coyote. Meanwhile, the smallest raoellid, Metkatius, was roughly the size of a house cat. Raoellidae is of particular importance to the understanding of cetacean evolution due to representing a transitional form between fully-terrestrial artiodactyls and the semi-aquatic pakicetids. The raoellid that has been most thoroughly studied and most heavily contributed to the knowledge of Raoellidae is Indohyus. It showed signs of adaptations to aquatic life, including dense limb bones that reduce buoyancy so that they could stay underwater, which are similar to the adaptations found in modern aquatic mammals such as the hippopotamus. This suggests a similar survival strategy to the African chevrotain or water chevrotain which, when threatened by a bird of prey, dives into water and hides beneath the surface for up to four minutes.

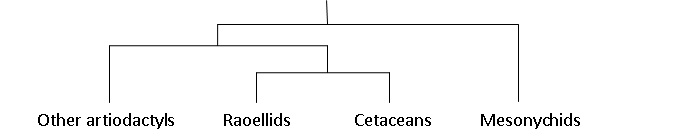
Possible relationships between cetaceans and other ungulate groups.

=== Pakicetidae ===
The pakicetids were digitigrade hoofed mammals that are thought to be the earliest known cetaceans, with Raoellidae being the closest sister group. They lived in the early Eocene, around 50 million years ago. Their fossils were first discovered in North Pakistan in 1979, located at a river not far from the shores of the former Tethys Sea. After the initial discovery, more fossils were found, mainly in the early Eocene fluvial deposits in northern Pakistan and northwestern India. Based on this discovery, pakicetids most likely lived in an arid environment with ephemeral streams and moderately developed floodplains millions of years ago. By using stable oxygen isotopes analysis, they were shown to drink fresh water, implying that they lived around freshwater bodies. Their diet probably included land animals that approached water for drinking or some freshwater aquatic organisms that lived in the river. The elongated cervical vertebrae and the four, fused sacral vertebrae are consistent with artiodactyls, making Pakicetus one of the earliest fossils to be recovered from the period following the Cetacea/Artiodactyla divergence event.

Pakicetids are classified as cetaceans mainly due to the structure of the auditory bulla (ear bone), which is formed only from the ectotympanic bone. The shape of the ear region in pakicetids is highly unusual and the skull is cetacean-like, although a blowhole is still absent at this stage. The jawbone of pakicetids also lacks the enlarged space (mandibular foramen) that is filled with fat or oil, which is used in receiving underwater sound in modern cetaceans. They have dorsal orbits (eye sockets facing up), which are similar to crocodiles. This eye placement helps submerged predators observe potential prey above the water. According to a 2009 study, the teeth of pakicetids also resemble the teeth of fossil whales, being less like a dog's incisors, and having serrated triangular teeth, which is another link to more modern cetaceans. It was initially thought that the ears of pakicetids were adapted for underwater hearing, but, as would be expected from the anatomy of the rest of this creature, the ears of pakicetids are specialized for hearing on land. However, pakicetids were able to listen underwater by using enhanced bone conduction, rather than depending on the tympanic membrane like other land mammals. This method of hearing did not give directional hearing underwater.

Pakicetids have long thin legs, with relatively short hands and feet which suggest that they were poor swimmers. To compensate for that, their bones are unusually thick (osteosclerotic), which is probably an adaptation to make the animal heavier to counteract the buoyancy of the water. According to a 2001 morphological analysis by Thewissen et al., pakicetids display no aquatic skeletal adaptation; instead they display adaptations for running and jumping. Hence pakicetids were most likely aquatic waders.

=== Ambulocetidae ===
Ambulocetus, which lived about 49 million years ago, was discovered in Pakistan in 1994. They were vaguely crocodile-like mammals, possessing large brevirostrine jaws. In the Eocene, ambulocetids inhabited the bays and estuaries of the Tethys Sea in northern Pakistan. The fossils of ambulocetids are always found in near-shore shallow marine deposits associated with abundant marine plant fossils and littoral mollusks. Although they are found only in marine deposits, their oxygen isotope values indicate that they consumed a range of water with different degrees of salinity, with some specimens having no evidence of sea water consumption and others that did not ingest fresh water at the time when their teeth were fossilized. It is clear that ambulocetids tolerated a wide range of salt concentrations. Hence, ambulocetids represent a transition phase of cetacean ancestors between fresh water and marine habitat.

The mandibular foramen in ambulocetids had increased in size, which indicates that a fat pad was likely to be housed in the lower jaw. In modern toothed whales, this fat pad in the mandibular foramen extends posteriorly to the middle ear. This allows sounds to be received in the lower jaw, and then transmitted through the fat pad to the middle ear. Similar to pakicetids, the orbits of ambulocetids are on the top of the skull, but they face more laterally than in pakicetids.

Ambulocetids had relatively long limbs with particularly strong hind legs, and they retained a tail with no sign of a fluke. The hindlimb structure of Ambulocetids shows that their ability to engage in terrestrial locomotion was significantly limited compared to that of contemporary terrestrial mammals, and likely did not come to land at all. The skeletal structures of the knee and ankle indicates that the motion of the hindlimbs was restricted into one plane. This suggests that, on land, propulsion of the hindlimbs was powered by the extension of dorsal muscles. They probably swam by pelvic paddling (a way of swimming which mainly utilizes their hind limbs to generate propulsion in water) and caudal undulation (a way of swimming which uses the undulations of the vertebral column to generate force for movements), as otters, seals and modern cetaceans do. This is an intermediate stage in the evolution of cetacean locomotion, as modern cetaceans swim by caudal oscillation (a way of swimming similar to caudal undulation, but is more energy efficient).

A recent study suggests that ambulocetids were fully aquatic like modern cetaceans, possessing a similar thoracic morphology and being unable to support their weight on land. This suggests that complete abandonment of the land evolved much earlier among cetaceans than previously thought. However the scientists involved in the study cautioned that the study was limited by a lack of information on the exact density of the bone, the location of the centre of mass, and the reliance of false ribs for thoracic support.

=== Remingtonocetidae ===
Remingtonocetids lived in the Middle-Eocene in South Asia, about 49 to 43 million years ago. Compared to family Pakicetidae and Ambulocetidae, Remingtonocetidae was a diverse family found in north and central Pakistan and western India. Remingtonocetids were also found in shallow marine deposits, but they were obviously more aquatic than ambulocetidae. This is demonstrated by the recovery of their fossils from a variety of coastal marine environments, including near-shore and lagoonal deposits. According to stable oxygen isotopes analysis, most remingtonocetids did not ingest fresh water, and had hence lost their dependency on fresh water relatively soon after their origin.

The orbits of remingtonocetids faced laterally and were small. This suggests that vision was not an important sense for them. The nasal opening, which eventually becomes the blowhole in modern cetaceans, was located near the tip of the snout. The position of the nasal opening had remained unchanged since pakicetids. One of the notable features in remingtonocetids is that the semicircular canals, which are important for balancing in land mammals, had decreased in size. This reduction in size had closely accompanied the cetacean radiation into marine environments. According to a 2002 study done by Spoor et al., this modification of the semicircular canal system may represent a crucial 'point of no return' event in early cetacean evolution, which excluded a prolonged semi-aquatic phase.

Compared to ambulocetids, remingtonocetids had relatively short limbs. Based on their skeletal remains, remingtonocetids were probably amphibious cetaceans that were well adapted to swimming, and likely to swim by caudal undulation only.

=== Protocetidae ===
The protocetids form a diverse and heterogeneous group known from Asia, Europe, Africa, and North America. They lived in the Eocene, approximately 48 to 35 million years ago. The fossil remains of protocetids were uncovered from coastal and lagoonal facies in South Asia; unlike previous cetacean families, their fossils uncovered from Africa (e.g., Phiomicetus, Protocetus, Aegyptocetus, Togocetus) and North America (e.g., Georgiacetus) also include open marine forms. They were probably amphibious, but more aquatic compared to remingtonocetids. Protocetids were the first cetaceans to leave the Indian subcontinent and disperse to all shallow subtropical oceans of the world. There were many genera among the family Protocetidae. There were different degrees of aquatic adaptations in this group, with some able to support their weight on land, and others not. The discovery of the southeastern Pacific Peregocetus indicates they crossed the Atlantic and achieved circum-equatorial distribution by 40 mya. Their amphibious nature is supported by the discovery of a pregnant Maiacetus, in which the fossilised fetus was positioned for a head-first delivery, suggesting that Maiacetus gave birth on land. If they gave birth in the water, the fetus would be positioned for a tail-first delivery to avoid drowning during birth.

Unlike remingtonocetids and ambulocetids, protocetids have large orbits which are oriented laterally. Increasingly lateral-facing eyes might be used to observe underwater prey, and are similar to the eyes of modern cetaceans. Furthermore, the nasal openings were large and were halfway up the snout. The great variety of teeth suggests diverse feeding modes in protocetids. In both remingtonocetids and protocetids, the size of the mandibular foramen had increased. The large mandibular foramen indicates that the mandibular fat pad was present. However the air-filled sinuses that are present in modern cetaceans, which function to isolate the ear acoustically to enable better underwater hearing, were still not present. The external auditory meatus (ear canal), which is absent in modern cetaceans, was also present. Hence, the method of sound transmission that were present in them combines aspects of pakicetids and modern odontocetes (toothed whales). At this intermediate stage of hearing development, the transmission of airborne sound was poor due to the modifications of the ear for underwater hearing while directional underwater hearing was also poor compared to modern cetaceans.

Some protocetids had short, wide fore- and hindlimbs that were likely to have been used in swimming, but the limbs gave a slow and cumbersome locomotion on land. It is possible that some protocetids had flukes. However, it is clear that they were adapted even further to an aquatic life-style. In Rodhocetus, for example, the sacrum (a bone that, in land-mammals, is a fusion of five vertebrae that connects the pelvis with the rest of the vertebral column) was divided into loose vertebrae. However, the pelvis was still connected to one of the sacral vertebrae. The ungulate ancestry of these archaeocetes is still underlined by characteristics like the presence of hooves at the ends of the toes in Rodhocetus.

The foot structure of Rodhocetus shows that protocetids were predominantly aquatic. A 2001 study done by Gingerich et al. hypothesized that Rodhocetus locomoted in the oceanic environment similarly to how ambulocetids pelvic paddling, which was supplemented by caudal undulation. Terrestrial locomotion of Rodhocetus was very limited due to their hindlimb structure. It is thought that they moved in a way similar to how eared seals move on land, by rotating their hind flippers forward and underneath their body.

=== Basilosauridae ===
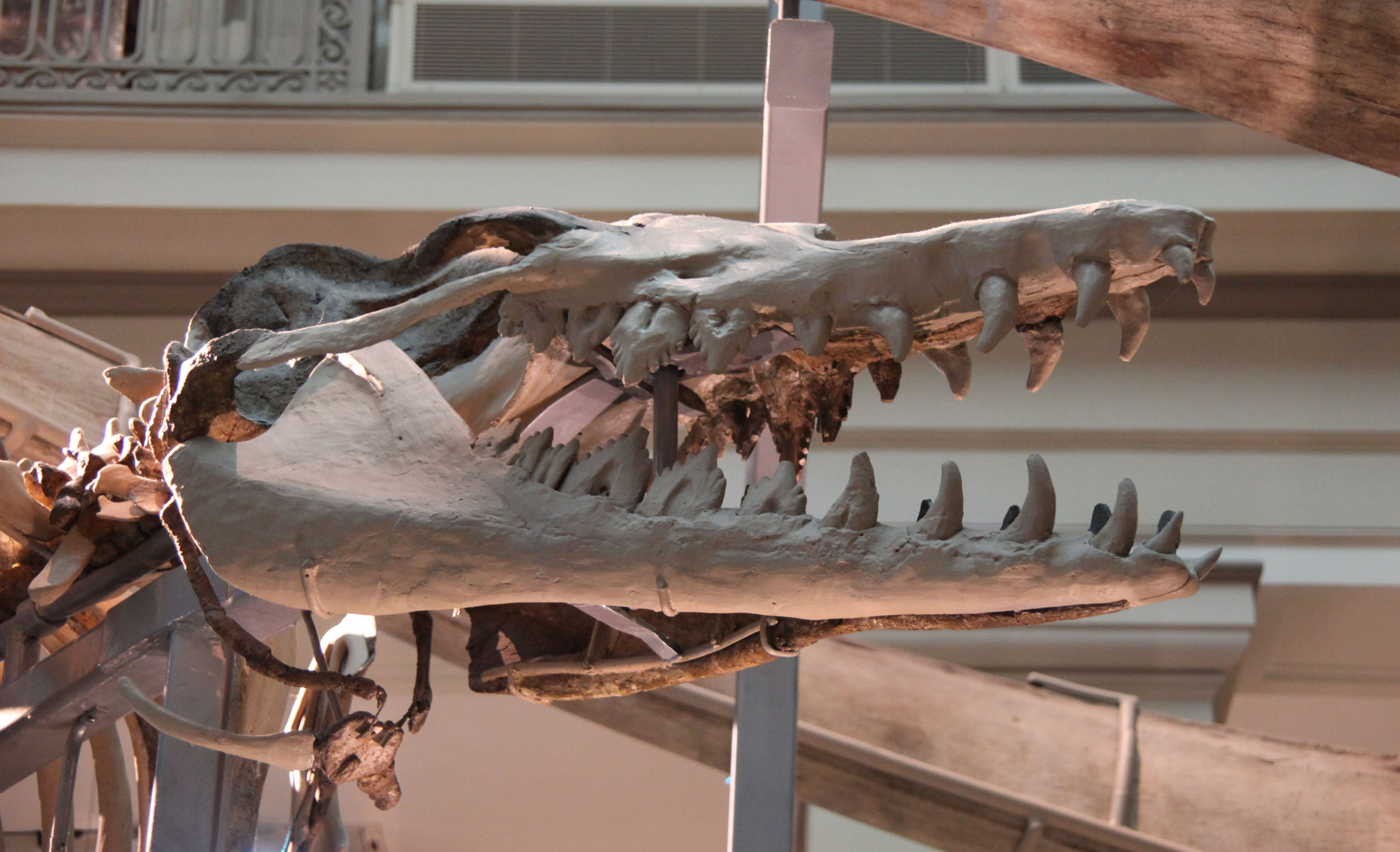
Archaeocetes (like this Basilosaurus) had a heterodont dentition

Basilosaurids and dorudontines lived together in the late Eocene around 41 to 33.9 million years ago, and are the oldest known obligate aquatic cetaceans. They were fully recognizable whales which lived entirely in the ocean. This is supported by their fossils usually found in deposits indicative of fully marine environments, lacking any freshwater influx. They were probably distributed throughout the tropical and subtropical seas of the world. Basilosaurids are commonly found in association with dorudontines, and were closely related to one another. The fossilised stomach contents in one basilosaurid indicates that it ate fish.

Although they look very much like modern cetaceans, basilosaurids lacked the 'melon organ' that allows toothed whales to use echolocation. They had small brains; this suggests they were solitary and did not have the complex social structures of some modern cetaceans. The mandibular foramen of basilosaurids covered the entire depth of the lower jaw as in modern cetaceans. Their orbits faced laterally, and the nasal opening had moved even higher up the snout, closer to the position of the blowhole in modern cetaceans. Furthermore, their ear structures were functionally modern, with the insertion of air-filled sinuses between ear and skull. Unlike modern cetaceans, basilosaurids retained a large external auditory meatus.

Both basilosaurids have skeletons that are immediately recognizable as cetaceans. A basilosaurid was as big as the larger modern whales, with genera like Basilosaurus reaching lengths of up to 60 ft (18 m) long; dorudontines were smaller, with genera like Dorudon reaching about 15 ft (4.6 m) long. The smallest basilosaurid whale is Tutcetus and measures 8.2 ft (2.5 m) long. The large size of basilosaurids is due to the extreme elongation of their lumbar vertebrae. They had a tail fluke, but their body proportions suggest that they swam by caudal undulation and that the fluke was not used for propulsion. In contrast, dorudontines had a shorter but powerful vertebral column. They too had a fluke and, unlike basilosaurids, they probably swam similarly to modern cetaceans, by using caudal oscillations. The forelimbs of basilosaurids were probably flipper-shaped, and the external hind limbs were tiny and were certainly not involved in locomotion. Their fingers, however, retained the mobile joints of their ambulocetid relatives. The two tiny but well-formed hind legs of basilosaurids were probably used as claspers when mating. The pelvic bones associated with these hind limbs were not connected to the vertebral column as they were in protocetids. Essentially, any sacral vertebrae can no longer be clearly distinguished from the other vertebrae.

Both basilosaurids and dorudontines are relatively closely related to modern cetaceans, which belong to parvorders Odontoceti and Mysticeti. However, according to a 1994 study done by Fordyce and Barnes, the large size and elongated vertebral body of basilosaurids preclude them from being ancestral to extant forms. As for dorudontines, there are some species within the family that do not have elongated vertebral bodies, which might be the immediate ancestors of Odontoceti and Mysticeti. The other basilosaurids became extinct.

== Evolution of modern cetaceans ==
=== Baleen whales ===
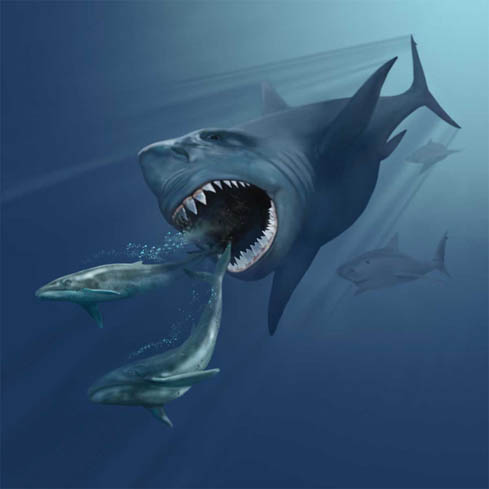
Artistic impression of two Eobalaenoptera pursued by the giant shark Otodus megalodon

All modern baleen whales or mysticetes are filter-feeders which have baleen in place of teeth, though the exact means by which baleen is used differs among species (gulp-feeding within balaenopterids, skim-feeding within balaenids, and bottom plowing within eschrichtiids). The first members of both groups appeared during the middle Miocene. Filter feeding is very beneficial as it allows baleen whales to efficiently gain huge energy resources, which makes the large body size in modern varieties possible. The development of filter feeding may have been a result of worldwide environmental change and physical changes in the oceans. A large-scale change in ocean current and temperature could have contributed to the radiation of modern mysticetes. The earlier varieties of baleen whales, or "archaeomysticetes", such as Janjucetus and Mammalodon had very little baleen and relied mainly on their teeth.

There is also evidence of a genetic component of the evolution of toothless whales. Multiple mutations have been identified in genes related to the production of enamel in modern baleen whales. These are primarily insertion/deletion mutations that result in premature stop codons. It is hypothesized that these mutations occurred in cetaceans already possessing preliminary baleen structures, leading to the pseudogenization of a "genetic toolkit" for enamel production. Recent research has also indicated that the development of baleen and the loss of enamel-capped teeth both occurred once, and both occurred on the mysticete stem branch.

Generally it is speculated the four modern mysticete families have separate origins among the cetotheres. Modern baleen whales, Balaenopteridae (rorquals and humpback whale, Megaptera novaengliae), Balaenidae (right whales), Eschrichtiidae (gray whale, Eschrictius robustus), and Neobalaenidae (pygmy right whale, Caperea marginata) all have derived characteristics presently unknown in any cetothere and vice versa (such as a sagittal crest). Mysticetes are also known for their gigantism, as baleen whales are among the largest organisms to ever have lived; they reach lengths greater than 20 m and weigh more than 100,000 kg. This gigantism is directly related to their feeding mechanism – mysticete size has been found to be dependent on the amount of baleen a mysticete can use to filter its prey. Additionally, size is a positively selected trait that gives mysticetes a boost in fitness. Mysticete populations will therefore slowly become even more gigantic as whales with larger amounts of baleen are selected.

=== Toothed whales ===
The adaptation of echolocation occurred when toothed whales (Odontoceti) split apart from baleen whales, and distinguishes modern toothed whales from fully aquatic archaeocetes. This happened around 34 million years ago in a second cetacean radiation. Modern toothed whales do not rely on their sense of sight, but rather on their sonar to hunt prey. Echolocation also allowed toothed whales to dive deeper in search of food, with light no longer necessary for navigation, which opened up new food sources. Toothed whales echolocate by creating a series of clicks emitted at various frequencies. Sound pulses are emitted, reflected off objects, and retrieved through the lower jaw. Skulls of Squalodon show evidence for the first hypothesized appearance of echolocation. Squalodon lived from the early to middle Oligocene to the middle Miocene, around 33–14 million years ago. Squalodon featured several commonalities with modern toothed whales: the cranium was well compressed (to make room for the melon, a part of the nose), the rostrum telescoped outward into a beak, a characteristic of the modern toothed whales that gave Squalodon an appearance similar to them. However, it is thought unlikely that squalodontids are direct ancestors of modern toothed whales.

The first oceanic dolphins such as kentriodonts, evolved in the late Oligocene and diversified greatly during the mid-Miocene. The first fossil cetaceans near shallow seas (where porpoises inhabit) were found around the North Pacific; species like Semirostrum were found along California (in what were then estuaries). These animals spread to the European coasts and Southern Hemisphere only much later, during the Pliocene. The earliest known ancestor of arctic whales is Denebola brachycephala from the late Miocene around 9–10 million years ago. A single fossil from Baja California indicates the family once inhabited warmer waters.

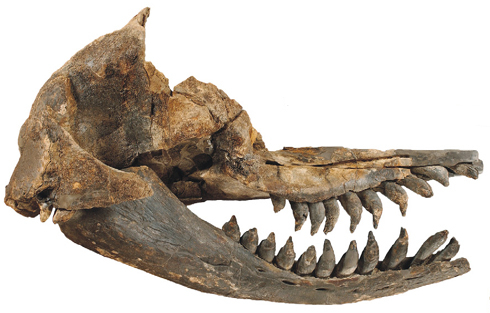
Acrophyseter skull

Ancient sperm whales differ from modern sperm whales in tooth count and the shape of the face and jaws. For example, Scaldicetus had a tapered rostrum. Genera from the Oligocene and Miocene had teeth in their upper jaws. These anatomical differences suggest that these ancient species may not have necessarily been deep-sea squid hunters like the modern sperm whale, but that some genera mainly ate fish. Contrary to modern sperm whales, most ancient sperm whales were built to hunt whales. Livyatan had a short and wide rostrum measuring 10 feet (3.0 m) across, which gave the whale the ability to inflict major damage on large struggling prey, such as other early whales. Species like these are collectively known as killer sperm whales or macroraptorial sperm whales.

Beaked whales consist of over 20 genera. Earlier varieties were probably preyed upon by killer sperm whales and large sharks such as megalodon. In 2008, a large number of fossil ziphiids were discovered off the coast of South Africa, confirming the remaining ziphiid species might just be a remnant of a higher diversity that has since gone extinct. After studying numerous fossil skulls, researchers discovered the absence of functional maxillary teeth in all South African ziphiids, which is evidence that suction feeding had already developed in several beaked whale lineages during the Miocene. Extinct ziphiids also had robust skulls, suggesting that tusks were used for male-male interactions.

== Skeletal evolution ==
Dolphins (aquatic mammals) and ichthyosaurs (extinct marine reptiles) share a number of unique adaptations for fully aquatic lifestyle and are frequently used as extreme examples of convergent evolution

Modern cetaceans have internal, rudimentary hind limbs, such as reduced femurs, fibulas, and tibias, and a pelvic girdle. Indohyus has a thickened ectotympanic internal lip of the ear bone. This feature compares directly to that of modern cetaceans. Another similar feature was the composition of the teeth, which contained mostly calcium phosphate which is needed for eating and drinking by aquatic animals, though, unlike modern day toothed whales, they had a heterodont (more than one tooth morphology) dentition as opposed to a homodont (one tooth morphology present) dentition. Although they somewhat resembled a wolf, the fossils of pakicetids showed the eye sockets were much closer to the top of their head than that of other terrestrial mammals, but similar to the structure of the eyes in cetaceans. Their transition from land to water led to reshaping of the skull and food processing equipment because the eating habits were changing. The change in position of the eyes and limb bones is associated with the pakicetids becoming waders. The ambulocetids also began to develop long snouts, which is seen in current cetaceans. Their limbs (and hypothesized movement) were very similar to otters.

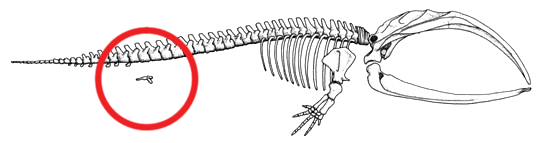
The skeleton of a bowhead whale with the hind limb and pelvic bone structure circled in red. This bone structure stays internal during the entire life of the species.

Limblessness in cetaceans does not represent a regression of fully formed limbs nor the absence of limb bud initiation, but rather arrest of limb bud development. Limb buds develop normally in cetacean embryos. Limb buds progress to the condensation phase of early skeletogenesis, where nerves grow into the limb bud and the apical ectodermal ridge (AER), a structure that ensures proper limb development, appears functional. Occasionally, the genes that code for longer extremities cause a modern whale to develop miniature legs (atavism).

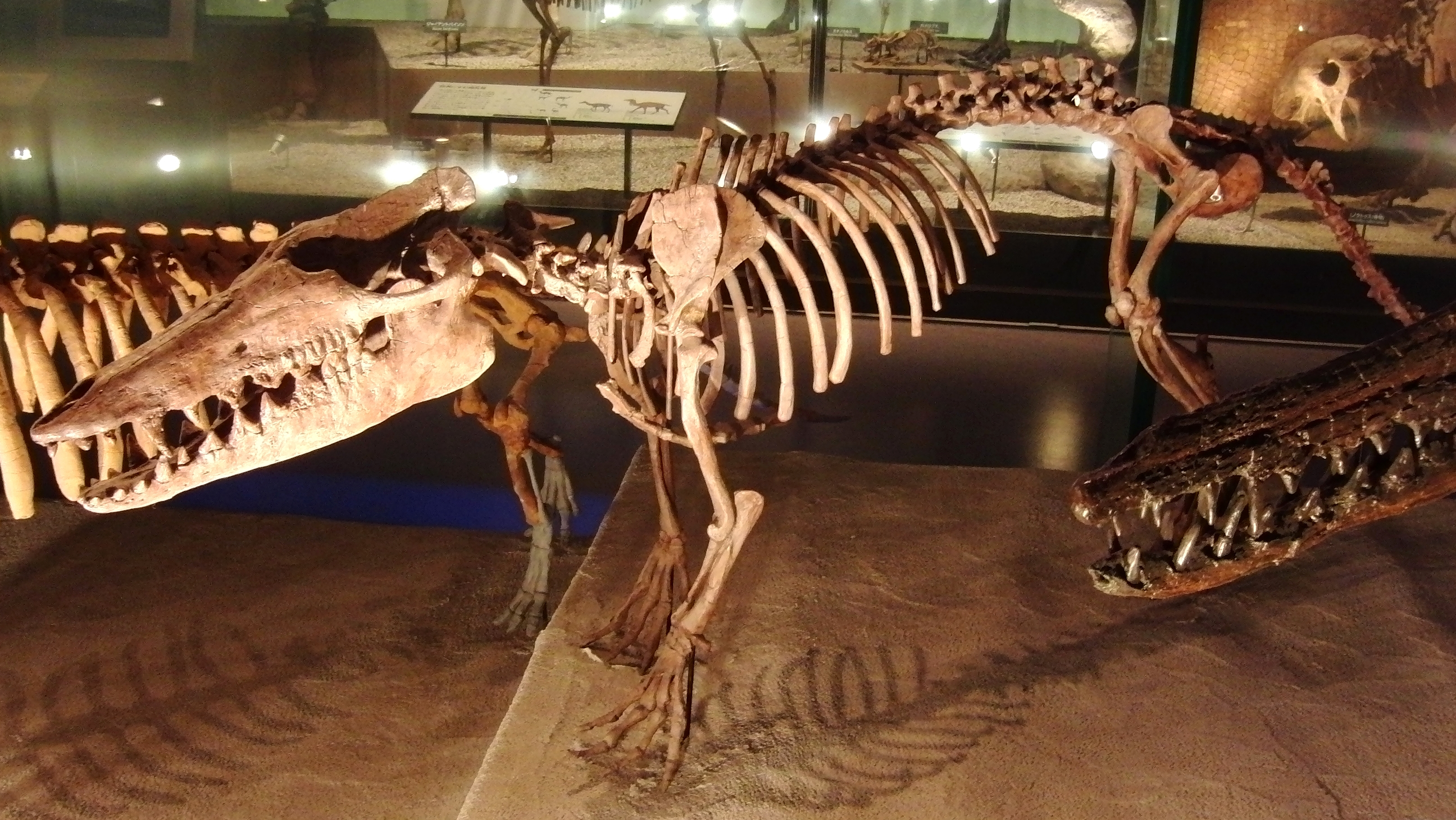
Pakicetus attocki skeleton

Pakicetus had a pelvic bone most similar to that of terrestrial mammals. In later species, such as Basilosaurus, the pelvic bone, no longer attached to the vertebrae and the ilium, was reduced. Certain genes are believed to be responsible for the changes that occurred to the cetacean pelvic structure, such as BMP7, PBX1, PBX2, PRRX1, and PRRX2. The pelvic girdle in modern cetaceans were once thought to be vestigial structures that served no purpose at all. The pelvic girdle in male cetaceans is different in size compared to females, and the size is thought to be a result of sexual dimorphism. The pelvic bones of modern male cetaceans are more massive, longer, and larger than those of females. Due to the sexual dimorphism displayed, they were most likely involved in supporting male genitalia that remain hidden behind abdominal walls until sexual reproduction occurs.

Early archaeocetes such as Pakicetus had the nasal openings at the end of the snout, but in later species such as Rodhocetus, the openings had begun to drift toward the top of the skull. This is known as nasal drift. The nostrils of modern cetaceans have become modified into blowholes that allow them to break to the surface, inhale, and submerge with convenience. The ears began to move inward as well, and, in the case of Basilosaurus, the middle ears began to receive vibrations from the lower jaw. Today's modern toothed whales use their melon organ, a pad of fat, for echolocation.

== Genetics insights ==
The time of early cetacean evolution is consistent with dN/dS analysis estimates of cetacean UCP-1 gene inactivation, likely relaxing selection pressures against UCP-1, leading to pseudogenization. UCP-1 inactivation in cetaceans initiated the shift from heat production to heat conservation through blubber formation/thermal insulation as evidenced by a transgenic mouse model simulating cetacean-like UCP1 gene inactivation. While UCP1 pseudogenization initiated the development of these phenotypes, they weren't solidified until subsequent ADRB3 inactivation during the Eocene-Oligocene transition, which was marked by an estimated 4°C drop in benthic temperatures. ADRB3 is expressed primarily in adipocytes and functions primarily as a key regulator of lipolysis. Global cooling during the Eocene-Oligocene transition likely selected against ADRB3, favoring more robust thermal insulation provided by dense blubber formation and gigantism, and driving the modern cetacean phenotype.

== Radiation events ==
There are three major radiation events that mark diversification and speciation in the evolutionary history of Cetacea. The first occurred around the middle Eocene (40 Mya) when these early cetaceans abandoned riverine and shallow coastal habitats, setting the scene for Protocetidae – the first fully marine cetacean. With the oceans and its nutrients at their disposal, rapidly diversifying protocetids were also responsible for the first major geographic expansion, dispersing throughout North Africa, Europe, and North America. The second of three major radiation events occurred near the start of the Oligocene (~34 Mya) when Neoceti diverged from Basilosauridae. This radiation event concurrently occurs with the breakup of Gondwana and the opening of the Southern Ocean, wildly changing ocean ecosystems, productivity, and temperature gradients. The timing of this second radiation event is not coincidental, as the following diversification of cetaceans was likely due to new ecological opportunities the change in oceans gave them. The final major radiation event, occurring throughout the middle Miocene and into the Pliocene (12 Mya to 2 Mya), was not due to a specific event but is associated with widespread generic expansion of odontocetes and mysticetes. Some modern genera of cetaceans began to emerge, including Balaenoptera, a genus of rorquals that includes the blue whale. Delphinidae, ocean dolphins, also arose during this radiation event in the late Miocene.

== Ongoing evolution ==
=== Culture ===
Researchers pushed a pole with a conical sponge attached along the substrate to simulate sponging behavior by dolphins. They videotaped this experiment to learn what prey was available on the seafloor and why a sponge would be beneficial to foraging rather than echolocation.

Culture is group-specific behavior transferred by social learning. Tool use to aid with foraging is one example. Whether or not a dolphin uses a tool affects its eating behavior, which causes differences in diet. Also, using a tool allows a new niche and new prey to open up for that particular dolphin. Due to these differences, fitness levels change within the dolphins of a population, which further causes evolution to occur in the long run. Culture and social networks have played a large role in the evolution of modern cetaceans, as concluded in studies showing dolphins preferring mates with the same socially learned behaviors, and humpback whales using songs between breeding areas. For dolphins particularly, the largest non-genetic effects on their evolution are due to culture and social structure.

Based on a 2014 study, the population of Indo-Pacific bottlenose dolphins (Tursiops sp.) around Shark Bay of Western Australia can be divided into spongers and nonspongers. Spongers put sea sponges on their snouts as protection against abrasions from sharp objects, stingray barbs, or toxic organisms. The sponges also help the dolphins target fish without swim bladders, since echolocation cannot detect these fish easily against a complex background. Spongers also specifically forage in deep channels, but nonspongers are found foraging in both deep and shallow channels. This foraging behavior is mainly passed on from mother to child. Therefore, since this is a group behavior being passed down by social learning, this tool use is considered a cultural trait.

Researchers in a 2014 study in Shark Bay found the fatty acid analyses between the West and East Gulf populations to differ, which is due to the two areas having different food sources. However, when comparing data from within the West Gulf, the spongers vs. the nonspongers in the deep channels had very different fatty acid results even though they are in the same habitat. Nonspongers from deep and shallow channels had similar data. This suggests that sponging was the cause of the different data and not the deep vs. shallow channels. Sponging opened up a new niche for the dolphins and allowed them access to new prey, which caused long-term dietary changes. By producing different food sources within a population, there is less intrapopulation competition for resources, showing character displacement. As a result, the carrying capacity increases since the entire population does not depend on one food source. The fitness levels within the population also change, thus allowing this culture to evolve.

==== Social structure ====
Social structure forms groups with individuals that interact with one another, and this allows for cultural traits to emerge, exchange, and evolve. This relationship is especially seen in the bottlenose dolphin populations in southwestern Australia, which have been known to beg for food from fishermen. This begging behavior was spread through the population due to individual (dolphins spending time around boats) and social (dolphins spending time with other dolphins who express begging behavior) learning.

Culture can, however, impact social structure by causing behavior matching and assortive mating. Individuals within a certain culture are more likely to mate with individuals using the same behaviors rather than a random individual, thus influencing social groups and structure. For example, the spongers of Shark Bay preferentially stick with other spongers. Also, some bottlenose dolphins in Moreton Bay, Australia followed prawn trawlers to feed on their debris, while other dolphins in the same population did not. The dolphins preferentially associated with individuals with same behavior even though they all lived in the same habitat. Later on, prawn trawlers were no longer present, and the dolphins integrated into one social network after a couple of years.

Social networks can still affect and cause evolution on their own by impending fitness differences on individuals. According to a 2012 study, male calves had a lower survival rate if they had stronger bonds with juvenile males. However, when other age and sex classes were tested, their survival rate did not significantly change. This suggests that juvenile males impose a social stress on their younger counterparts. In fact, it has been documented that juvenile males commonly perform acts of aggression, dominance, and intimidation against the male calves. According to a 2010 study, certain populations of Shark Bay dolphins had varying levels of fitness and calf success. This is either due to social learning (whether or not the mother passed on her knowledge of reproductive ability to the calves), or due to the strong association between mother dolphins in the population; by sticking in a group, an individual mother does not need to be as vigilant all the time for predators.

Genetic studies conducted on Clymene dolphins (Stenella clymene) focused on their natural histories, and the results show that the origin of the species was actually an outcome of hybrid speciation. Hybridization between spinner dolphins (Stenella longirostris) and striped dolphins (Stenella coeruleoalba) in the North Atlantic was caused by constant habitat sharing of the two species. Relationships between these three species had been speculated according to notable resemblances between anatomies of the Clymene and the spinner dolphins, resulting in the former being regarded as subspecies of the latter until 1981, and the possibility of the Clymene dolphin as a hybrid between the spinner and the striped dolphins have come to question based on anatomical and behavioral similarities between these two species.

=== Environmental factors ===
Genome sequences done in 2013 revealed that the Yangtze river dolphin, or "baiji" (Lipotes vexillifer), lacks single nucleotide polymorphisms in its genome. After reconstructing the history of the baiji genome for this dolphin species, researchers found that the major decrease in genetic diversity occurred most likely due to a bottleneck event during the last deglaciation event. During this time period, sea levels were rising while global temperatures were increasing. Other historical climate events can be correlated and matched with the genome history of the Yangtze river dolphin as well. This shows how global and local climate change can drastically affect a genome, leading to changes in fitness, survival, and evolution of a species.

The European population of common dolphins (Delphinus delphis) in the Mediterranean have differentiated into two types: eastern and western. According to a 2012 study, this seems to be due to a recent bottleneck as well, which drastically decreased the size of the eastern Mediterranean population. Also, the lack of population structure between the western and eastern regions seems contradictory of the distinct population structures between other regions of dolphins. Even though the dolphins in the Mediterranean area had no physical barrier between their regions, they still differentiated into two types due to ecology and biology. Therefore, the differences between the eastern and western dolphins most likely stems from highly specialized niche choice rather than just physical barriers. Through this, environment plays a large role in the differentiation and evolution of this dolphin species.

The divergence and speciation within bottlenose dolphins has been largely due to climate and environmental changes over history. According to research, the divisions within the genus correlate with periods of rapid climate change. For example, the changing temperatures could cause the coast landscape to change, niches to empty up, and opportunities for separation to appear. In the Northeast Atlantic, specifically, genetic evidence suggests that the bottlenose dolphins have differentiated into coastal and pelagic types. Divergence seems most likely due to a founding event where a large group separated. Following this event, the separate groups adapted accordingly and formed their own niche specializations and social structures. These differences caused the two groups to diverge and to remain separated.

Two endemic, distinctive types of short-finned pilot whale, Tappanaga (or Shiogondou) the larger, northern type and Magondou the smaller, southern type, can be found along the Japanese archipelago where distributions of these two types mostly do not overlap by the oceanic front border around the easternmost point of Honshu. It is thought that the local extinction of long-finned pilot whales in the North Pacific in the 12th century could have triggered the appearance of Tappanaga, causing short-finned pilot whales to colonize the colder ranges of the long-finned variant. Whales with similar characteristics to the Tappanaga can be found along Vancouver Island and northern US coasts as well.

== See also ==
- Aquatic adaptation
- Evolution of mammals
- Evolution of sirenians
- List of extinct cetaceans
- Transitional form
