= Nalacetus =

Nalacetus Temporal range: Early Eocene, 50 Ma

Scientific classification
- Kingdom: Animalia
- Phylum: Chordata
- Class: Mammalia
- Infraclass: Placentalia
- Order: Artiodactyla
- Infraorder: Cetacea
- Family: †Pakicetidae
- Genus: †Nalacetus; Thewissen & Hussain 1998
- Species: †N. ratimitus

Binomial name
- †Nalacetus ratimitus Thewissen & Hussain 1998

Genus of mammals

Nalacetus is an extinct pakicetid early whale, fossils of which have been found in Lutetian red beds in Punjab, Pakistan (33.6°N 72.2°E, paleocoordinates 14.3°N 68.3°E). Nalacetus lived in a fresh water environment, was amphibious, and carnivorous. It was considered monophyletic by Cooper, Thewissen & Hussain 2009. It was said to be wolf-sized and one of the earliest forms of the order Cetacea.

Nalacetus is known mostly from dental remains from the Lutetian of the Kala Chitta Hill, Punjab, Pakistan:

- H-GSP (Note: Howard University-Geological Survey of Pakistan Project) 96055, right palatal fragment with P^{4} and M^{1−2}.
- H-GSP 30306, right maxillary fragment with P^{2} and partial P^{3−4}; a fragmentary mandible with fragmented teeth together with some isolated lower teeth.

In the cheek teeth of Pakicetus, the protocone lobe increases from the first molar to the third. In Nalacetus, in contrast, the protocone lobe is larger in the first molar than in the second.
