= Involucrum =

An involucrum (plural involucra) is a layer of new bone growth outside existing bone.

There are two main contexts:

- In pyogenic osteomyelitis where it is a layer of living bone that has formed around dead bone. It can be identified by radiographically (i.e., with x-rays).
- In cetaceans such as whales, it is a thick covering of bone over the middle-ear space.

== See also ==
- Sequestrum
