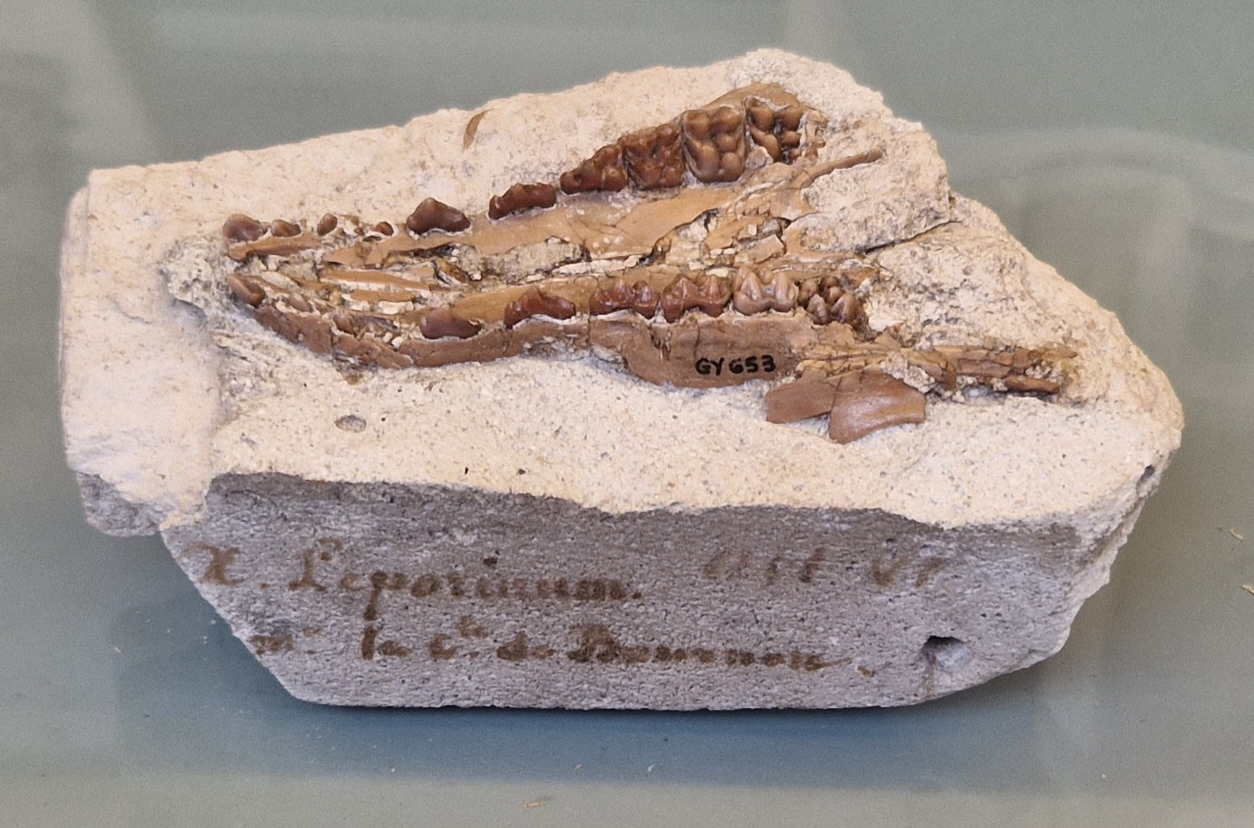
- Dichobune leporina lower jaw, National Museum of Natural History, France

Scientific classification
- Kingdom: Animalia
- Phylum: Chordata
- Class: Mammalia
- Order: Artiodactyla
- Family: †Dichobunidae
- Subfamily: †Dichobuninae
- Genus: †Dichobune; Cuvier, 1822

Type species
- †Dichobune leporina Cuvier, 1822

Other species
- †D. robertiana Gervais, 1848–1852; †D. fraasi Schlosser, 1902; †D. sigei Sudre, 1978; †D. jehennei Brunet and Sudre, 1980

Synonyms
- Genus synonymy: Didymodon Blake, 1863; Dichobunus Lydekker, 1885; Synonyms of D. leporina: Anoplotherium minus Cuvier, 1804; Anoplotherium leporinum Cuvier, 1822; Didymodon Vauclusianum Blake, 1863

= Dichobune =

Dichobune Temporal range: Middle Eocene – Middle Oligocene 47.8–30.8 Ma (Possible earliest record of up to ~50.8 Ma)

Extinct genus of early artiodactyls

Dichobune is the type genus of the Dichobunoidea, an extinct paraphyletic superfamily consisting of some of the earliest artiodactyls known in the fossil record. It was a primitive artiodactyl genus that was endemic to western Europe and lived from the Middle Eocene (or possibly the Early Eocene) to the Early Oligocene. The type species Dichobune leporina was originally described as a species belonging to Anoplotherium beginning in 1804 by the French naturalist Georges Cuvier, who noted its small size. Cuvier assigned it to its own subgenus Dichobune in 1822; later naturalists promoted it to genus rank and observed that it was not close to the Anoplotheriidae as previously thought. Today, there are five valid species within Dichobune.

Dichobune has a somewhat elongated skull with a lengthy snout (with the snout of D. jehennei being particularly lengthy), large and semi-centred orbits, and a complete dentition of 44 teeth (the maximum in placental mammals), which mainly consists of brachyodont (low-crowned) and bunodont (round-cusped) cheek teeth. Its dental morphologies suggest that it could have had a frugivorous diet, meaning that leaves were probably only a minor component of its diet compared to the likes of fruits and seeds. Its foot morphology was primitive with unfused foot bones including a total of four digits each, only two middle ones of which are functional for didactyl (two-toed) movements. Dichobunoids were generally small mammals, especially in comparison to modern artiodactyls, but Dichobune was medium-sized in comparison to its close relatives. Earlier species of Dichobune were smaller-sized while some later species were larger, with the late-appearing D. jehennei being the largest species of the genus.

The European subfamily Dichobuninae made its appearance by the Early to Middle Eocene, with D. aff. robertiana being among the earliest representatives. During much of its existence, western Europe was an archipelago that was isolated from the rest of Eurasia, meaning that Dichobune lived in a tropical-subtropical environment with various other animals that also evolved with strong levels of endemism. It survived multiple faunal turnover events within Europe, including the large Grande Coupure extinction event that drove many of its close relatives to extinction and replaced them with immigrant faunas from eastern Eurasia. Its survival into the Early Oligocene was not particularly long, but it likely descended into Metriotherium, a dichobunid that briefly coexisted with it and lasted up to the Late Oligocene.

== Taxonomy ==
=== Research history ===
==== Early history ====
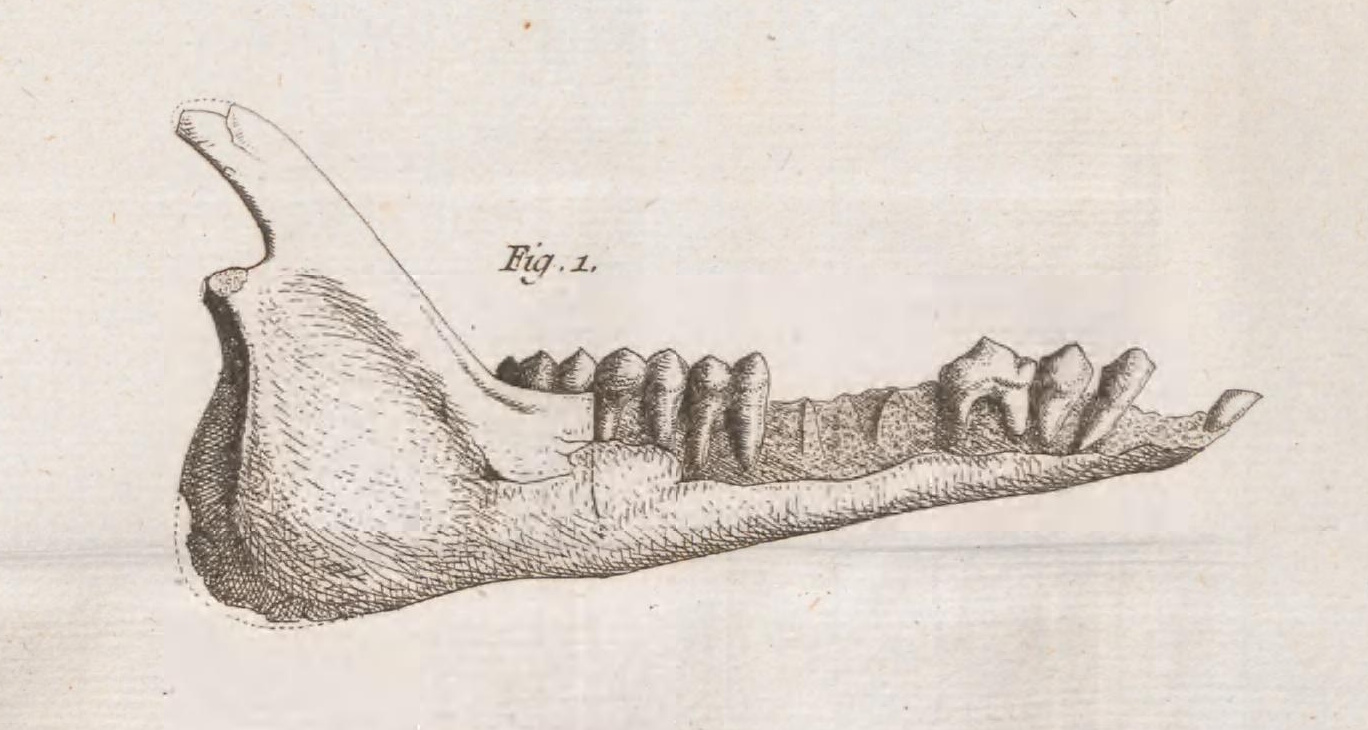
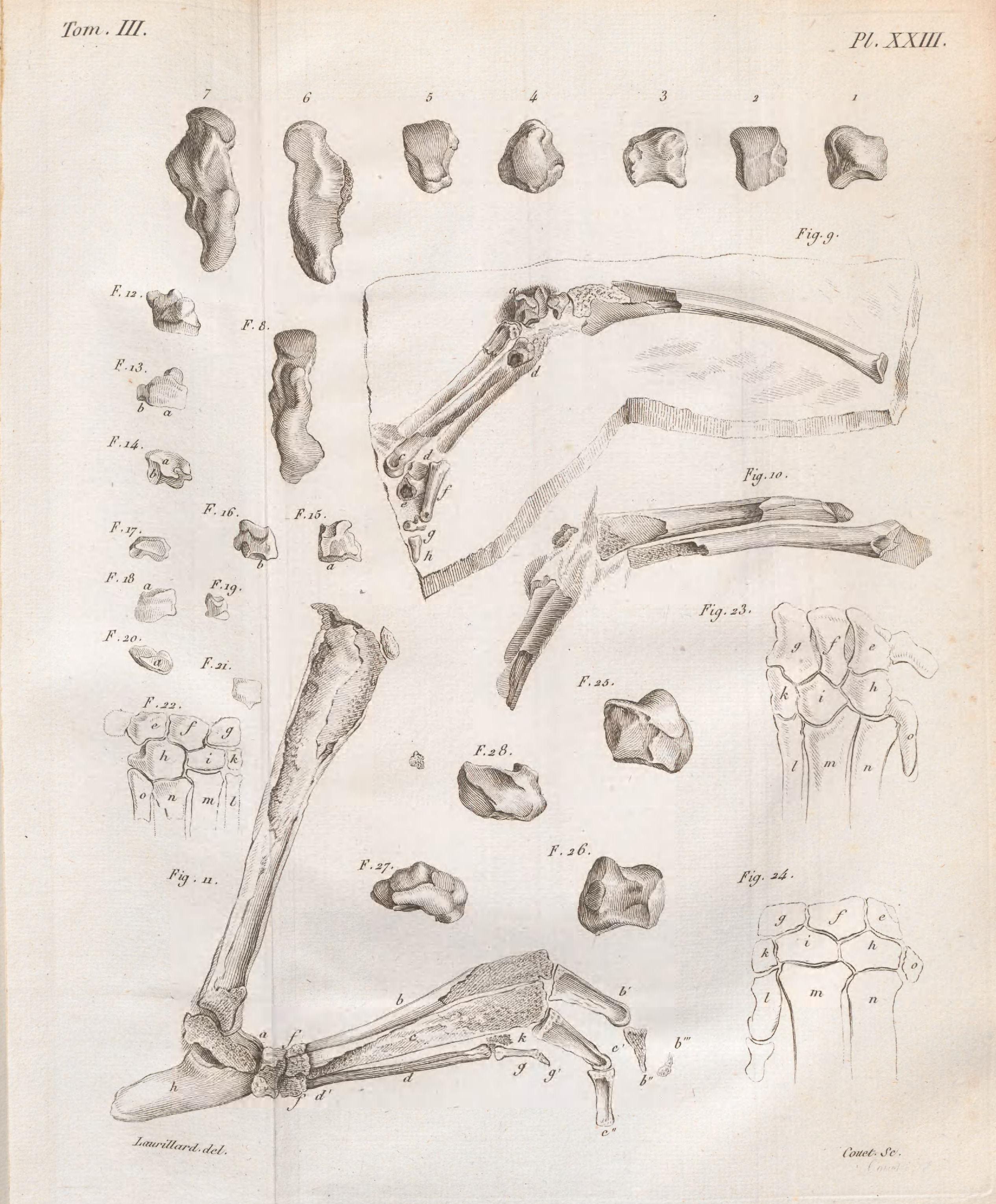
Illustrations of the mandible (top) and limb bones (bottom) of Dichobune leporina, 1822

In 1804, the French naturalist Georges Cuvier named an artiodactyl genus Anoplotherium, which he referred multiple new species from Montmartre to. Among the species was Anoplotherium minus, which was known by an astragalus implying that its foot was comparable in size to that of a hare. The next year in 1805, Cuvier noted a lower jaw that he assigned to A. minus and described hare-sized postcranial material (forefoot and hindfoot bones) implying that it had long legs and short, tetradactyl (four-toed) feet that made it differ from the didactyl (two-toed) feet of A. commune. In 1807, he assigned additional postcranial material to it, namely a tibia, humerus, radius, and ulna. In 1812, he redescribed the lower jaw and wrote about additional postcranial material assigned to A. minus (i.e. a tibia and calcaneum) and proposed behaviors of the different species based on their sizes and anatomies; he suggested that A. medium was to a roe deer what A. minus was to a hare but also suggested that the two species shared the same terrestrial gracility.

In 1822, Cuvier again referenced the species for being smaller than A. gracile (formerly A. medium). He said that its head was smaller than that of a fox but bigger than that of a hare, possibly equal to that of a raccoon. He provided it the "provisional" name A. leporinum, replacing the previous name A. minus. Cuvier created the Anoplotherium subgenus Dichobune based on the "hill" (or cusp) pair arrangements on its four molars, assigning A. leporinum, A. murinum, and A. obliquum to it. The etymology of the name Dichobune is derived from the Ancient Greek words δίχα (two) and βουνός (hill, usually referencing rounded cusps), referencing the paired ridge arrangements on its back molars.

In 1841, the British naturalist Richard Owen, treating Dichobune as a subgenus of Anoplotherium, established the species D. cervinum from a lower jaw from the Isle of Wight in the United Kingdom. It was later in an 1848–1852 work that the French naturalist Paul Gervais validated Dichobune as a genus that was distinct from Anoplotherium, with the taxon Cainotherium being reranked as a subgenus of the former. Gervais considered D. leporinum, D. cervinum, D. murinum, and D? obliquum to all be valid species but suggested that the latter species be transferred into another genus or subgenus. He additionally erected D. suillum based on fossils found in limestone deposits from the French localities of Passy and Nanterre. In a second volume of the same study, he considered Cainotherium to instead be a distinct genus and erected another species D. robertianum based on a dental fossil from the limestone deposits of Nanterre, naming it after a geologist named M. E. Robert who discovered it there. He followed up by erecting Amphimeryx for the species D. murinum and questioned the placement of D? suillum. In 1855, the researchers François Jules Pictet de la Rive, Charles-Théophile Gaudin, and Philippe de La Harpe listed in their illustrated figures of fossils the name D. Campichii, credited solely to Pictet. (Note: Due to archaic species naming conventions, authors of the 19th and 20th centuries tended to capitalize species names based on individuals or places.) Owen in 1857 supported Dichobune being a valid genus and created another species D. ovina using dental fossils that he felt were similar enough to D. leporina (emended from D. leporinum).

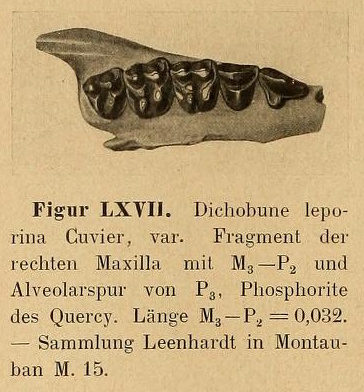
Partial upper dentition of D. leporina

In 1862, Swiss palaeontologist Ludwig Ruetimeyer hypothesized that Anoplotherium secundarium was a transitional species to Dichobune based on dental morphology and established the subgenus Diplobune under Dichobune. He also erected the species D. mülleri based on additional dental fossils. (Note: The latin script letter "ü" as used in multiple species names has been replaced by the letter combination "ue".) The British zoology lecturer Charles Carter Blake in 1863 erected the genus Didymodon and its only species Didymodon Vauclusianum using a dental specimen from a fossil collection in the Natural History Museum in London, arguing that the molars' forms closely resembled that of Dichobune but differed from all known fossil artiodactyl genera based on specific dental anatomies. He explained that the genus name derived from δίδυμος (twofold) and ὀδούς (tooth) while the species name derived from the French department of Vaucluse where the specimen originated from. In 1870, German palaeontologist Oscar Fraas argued that Dichobune had no evolutionary relationship with the Anoplotheriidae, then recognizing the anoplotheriid Diplobune as a distinct genus. In 1885, British naturalist Richard Lydekker emended Dichobune to Dichobunus, making Didymodon a synonym of it; he also listed Anoplotherium minus and Didymodon vauclusianus as synonyms of D. leporinus and referenced D. robertiana as being the smaller species of the genus. Lydekker, furthermore, reclassified D. ovinus into Dacrytherium and D. cervinus into Dichodon. In 1891, Ruetimeyer, using the name "Dichobune", recognized D. leporinum, D. Robertianum and D. Mülleri as valid species did not discuss the validity of D. Suillum. He additionally erected the species D. langii and D. pygmaea using additional dental material from the Swiss locality of Egerkingen.

==== Late history ====
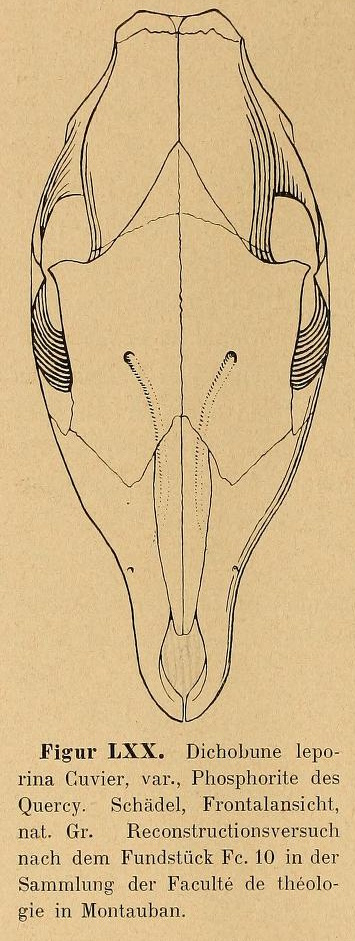
Reconstruction of the cranium of D. leporina in upper view, 1906

In 1902, German palaeontologist Max Schlosser described an upper jaw from mineral deposits in the German locality of Eselsberg that was held in State Museum of Natural History Stuttgart, comparing it in size to that of D. Campichi. Based on dental differences, he erected the species D. Fraasi. Later in 1906, Swiss palaeontologist Hans Georg Stehlin validated the taxonomic statuses and placements of D. leporina, D. robertiana, and D. Langi. Stehlin also studied dental fossils from the French phosphorite deposits of Caylux, assigning them to another named subspecies D. leporina major (or D. leporina var. major). He also erected two species: D. nobilis, basing it off of a maxilla fragment with molars from Egerkingen; and D. spinifera using a partial maxilla from Mormont in the Natural History Museum of Basel. He also suggested that D. Mülleri should be reclassified to a different genus. In 1908, Stehlin transferred "D." mülleri into Haplobunodon and tentatively reclassified both "D." Campichii and "D." suillus into Cebochoerus. He then followed up by synonymizing D. pygmaea with Pseudamphimeryx schlosseri and reclassified both D. nobilis and D. spinifera into their own genus Hyperdichobune in 1910. Stehlin also provisionally reclassified "D." obliquus into Haplomeryx.

In 1972, French palaeontologist Jean Sudre relisted "D." langi as a species of Hyperdichobune. He later erected D. sigei in 1978, having named it after fellow palaeontologist Bernard Sigé and designated its holotype based on an upper molar from the French locality of Lavergne. He also classified within Cebochoerus siullus the subgenus Gervachoerus; Gervachoerus has later been considered to be a distinct cebochoerid genus.

In 1980, Michel Brunet and Sudre studied a nearly complete skull from the French commune of Villebramar that dated to the Early Oligocene and was held at a fossil collection at the University of Poitiers. They designated the name D. jehennei to it, deriving its etymology after Yves Jehenne, who was a major contributor to fossil collections from Villebramar. In 1986, British palaeontologist Jerry J. Hooker reclassified "Cebochoerus" campichii into another cebochoerid genus Acotherulum. In addition to European specimens designated as Dichobune sp., one other from the Lushi Province of the Chinese province of Henan has been assigned the same name. A lower jaw from the Heti Formation of Henan that was previously assigned to ?Dichobune sp. has since been reassigned to another artiodactyl genus Limeryx.

=== Classification ===
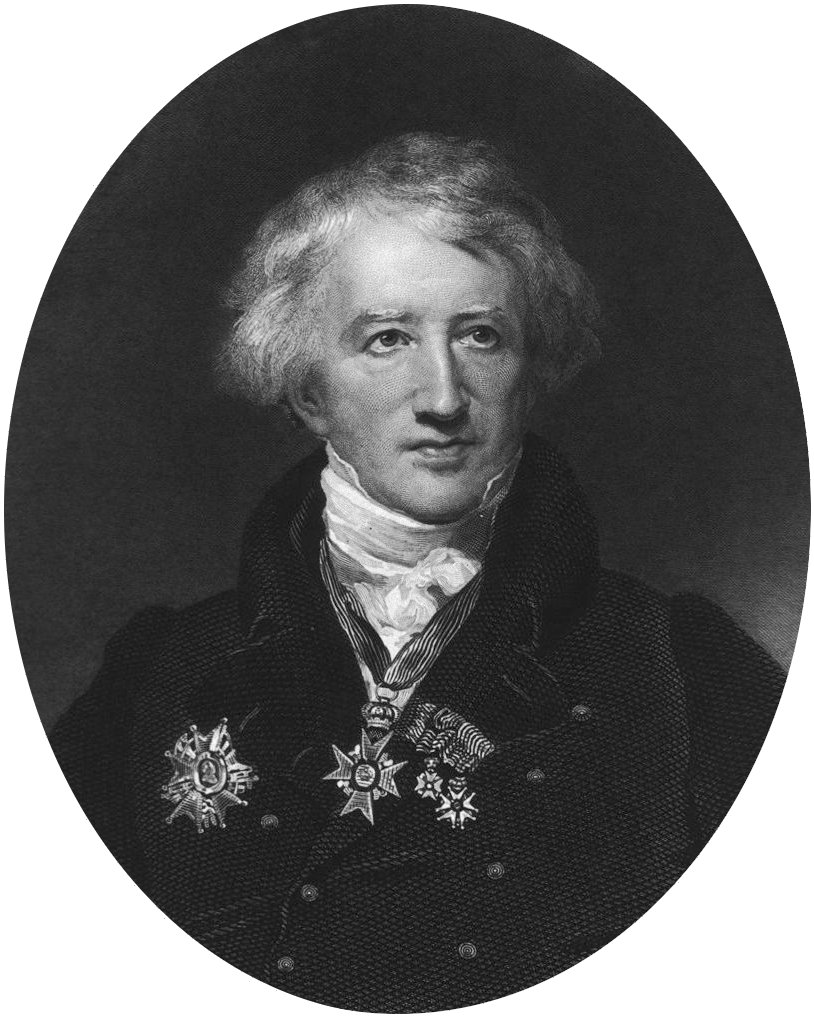
Portrait of Georges Cuvier, who erected Dichobune in 1822

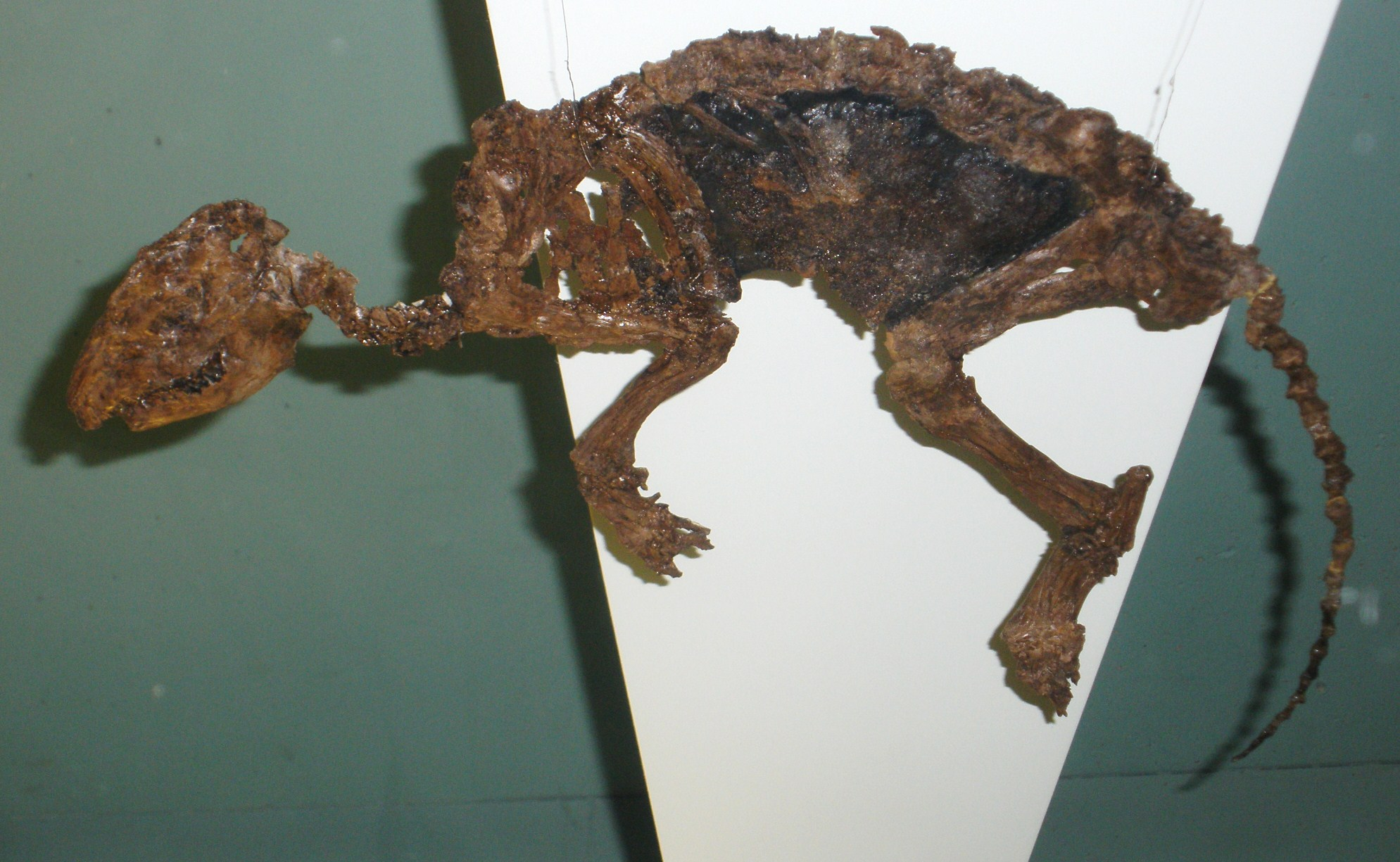
Skeleton of the related Aumelasia cf. gabineaudi, an early dichobunine

Dichobune is the type genus of the Dichobunidae, an extinct early artiodactyl family within the superfamily Dichobunoidea. The Dichobunoidea is a paraphyletic group of basal artiodactyls appearing in the Early Eocene that gave way to various other artiodactyl clades, extant and extinct. The Dichobunoidea is considered by researchers to consist of seven families: Cebochoeridae, Diacodexeidae, Dichobunidae, Helohyidae, Homacodontidae, Leptochoeridae, and Raoellidae (although not all researchers agree that the Raoellidae is a dichobunoid family as referenced by Abhay Rautela & Sunil Bajpai in 2023). Despite the consensus that the Dichobunoidea is a paraphyletic group, researchers are still investigating the extent to which certain members are stem taxa to other major artiodactyl clades. At least some dichobunoid families are thought to be monophyletic while others are considered to be paraphyletic or polyphyletic; this means some clades require further reassessment.

Some of the earliest artiodactyls to have appeared in the fossil record by the Early Eocene are dichobunoids that have simultaneously appeared in North America, Europe, and Asia. In both North America and Europe, species referred to Diacodexis are the earliest records of artiodactyls that extend back to the Wasatchian of the North American land mammal age and MP7 of the Mammal Palaeogene zones of Europe, respectively (Diacodexis and the Diacodexeidae are thought to both be polyphyletic). In Asia, some of the earliest artiodactyl genera, who correlate to equivalent ages, are the possible suiform Wutuhyus and dichobunoid Tsaganohyus. In the Early to Middle Eocene within the three continents, the artiodactyls were common mammals of small to medium sizes that generally had bunodont to bunoselenodont (bunodont plus selenodont) dentitions, thus making them important for biostratigraphy.

The Dichobunidae is a family of artiodactyls known from both Europe and Asia that contains multiple subfamilies: Dichobuninae, Hyperdichobuninae, Eurodexinae, and Lantianiinae. Members from both Europe and Asia appeared as early as the Early Eocene, evident by the early appearance of Eolantianus in Asia and of Protodichobune and Aumelasia in Europe by MP10. Both of the early dichobunids Protodichobune and Aumelasia, along with Dichobune, are genera belonging to the Dichobuninae. While most species of the subfamily are recorded exclusively from western Europe, one other species pending assessment as "Dichobune sp." is recorded from the Lushi Formation in China, although its status within the Dichobunidae is unclear. The Dichobuninae, and the wider Dichobunidae by extent, lasted up to the Late Oligocene, evident by the range of the dichobunine Metriotherium extending up to MP27.

In 2020, Vincent Luccisano et al. reconstructed a phylogenetic tree of the basal artiodactyls, a majority endemic to western Europe, from the Palaeogene. The results found the Dichobunidae, except for Aumelasia, as a paraphyletic stem group in relation to other artiodactyls. Both the Dichobuninae and Hyperdichobuninae are recovered as paraphyletic groups. Luccisano et al. noted the lack of phylogenetic resolution of the dichobunid subfamilies to each other and to other artiodactyl clades, which follows results from earlier studies and means that more research needs to be done for dichobunid phylogenetics. The phylogenetic tree as produced by the authors is shown below:

- Artiodactyla
  - Bunophorus
  - - Gunophorus
    - Diacodexis
  - - - Protodichobune
      - Eurodexis
    - - - Buxobune
        - - Mouillacitherium
          - Meniscodon
        - - - Hyperdichobune
            - - Dichobune robertiana
              - - Dichobune leporina
                - - Homacodon
                  - - Gobiohyus
                    - Suina
                      - - Khirtharia
                        - Entelodon
                      - - Palaeocheorus
                        - Perchoerus
          - - Haplobunodontidae
              - Haplobunodon
              - - Cuisitherium
                - Lophiobunodon
            - - Mixtotherium
              - - Robiacina
                - - - - Dacrytherium
                      - Diplobune
                    - - Xiphodon
                      - Paraxiphodon
                  - - - Cainotherium
                      - Paroxacron
                    - - Archaeomeryx
                      - - Amphimeryx
                        - Pseudamphimeryx
      - - Aumelasia
        - - - Hallebune
            - Amphirhagatherium
          - - Cebochoeridae
              - Cebochoerus
              - Gervachoerus
            - - Choeropotamus
              - Siamotherium

In 2023, Abhay Rautela and Sunil Bajpai created an analysis on the phylogenetic relationships between basal artiodactyls by compiling a matrix of dental remains of 34 artiodactyl species; most of these artiodactyl species are dichobunoids (Diacodexeidae, Dichobunidae, Homacodontidae, Cebochoeridae, Leptochoeridae, Raoellidae), but some are members of the Pakicetidae and one other species is a member of the Helohyidae (the basal placental mammal Protungulatum is the outgroup taxon in the analysis). One clade pairs Dichobune with Homacodon, Buxobune, and Gobiohyus based on specific dental traits. Based on the cladogram, Rautela and Bajpai defined Diacodexis, the Diacodexeidae, and Dichobunidae as all polyphyletic taxa. In the case of the dichobunines, this is because they are more closely paired with non-dichobunids than with the lantianiines (Eolantianus, Elaschitotherium) and hyperdichobunines (Mouillacitherium). Below is a cladogram by Rautela and Bajpai of the artiodactyl taxa based on a 50% majority consensus:

- Artiodactyla
  - Protungulatum
  - - Eurodexis
    - - - Diacodexis antunesi
        - - Chorlakkia
          - - Lantianiinae
              - Elaschitotherium
              - - Eolantianius
                - Mouillacitherium
            - Homacodontidae
              - - Asiohomacodon
                - Limeryx
              - - Gobiohyus
                - Dichobuninae
                  - Buxobune
                  - - Dichobune
                    - Homacodon
      - - - Diacodexis varleti
          - - Pakicetidae
              - Pakicetus
              - - Ichthyolestes
                - Nalacetus
            - - Diacodexis gazini
              - - Protodichobune
                - - Aumelasia
                  - - Gervachoerus
                    - - Raoellidae
                        - Khirtharia
                        - - Indohyus
                          - Rajouria
        - - Gujaratia
          - Diacodexeidae
            - - Diacodexis secans
              - - Diacodexis gigasei
                - - Diacodexis ilicis
                  - Simpsonodus
            - - - Diacodexis gracilis
                - Diacodexis morrisi
              - - Bunophorus
                - Diacodexis minutus
                - Leptochoerus

In 2022, Weppe conducted a phylogenetic analysis in his academic thesis regarding Palaeogene artiodactyl lineages, focusing most specifically on the endemic European families but also on European dichobunids. He found that the Dichobuninae was more closely related to the Cebochoeridae and species classified to the polyphyletic Choeropotamidae, contrasting with the Hyperdichobuninae, which was paraphyletic in relation to the other endemic European artiodactyl groups (Amphimerycidae, Anoplotheriidae, Xiphodontidae, Mixtotheriidae, and Cainotherioidea). Within the dichobunine clade, which includes Dichobune and Metriotherium, D. robertiana is identified as the plesiomorphic species that makes up the first branch and is followed by those of D. sigei, M. mirabile, and a clade consisting of D. jehennei and D. leporina. He also stated that the species named D. aff. robertiana had more plesiomorphic traits than the other Dichobune species and supported the idea from prior literature that M. mirabile, D. jehennei, and D. leporina were more derived species within their subfamily. He defined Dichobune as being paraphyletic in relation to Metriotherium.

== Description ==
=== Skull ===
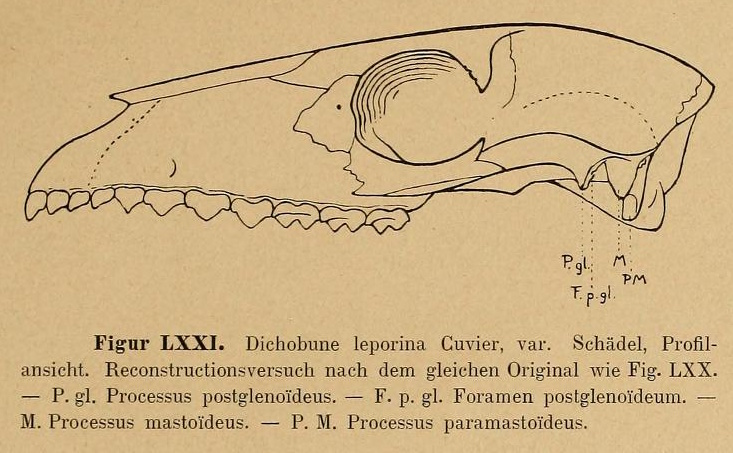
Reconstruction of the cranium of D. leporina at a side view, 1906

The Dichobuninae is diagnosed as having slightly elongated snouts. Several skulls of Dichobune that are known are assigned to D. leporina or D. cf. leporina. Dichobune is typically defined in part by several cranial traits, among them a somewhat elongated skull with a rounded neurocranium, large and semi-centred orbits, well-developed mastoid parts of the temporal bones, and unossified tympanic parts of the temporal bones. D. jehennei, the latest species of Dichobune, particularly stands out in its highly elongated snout, narrow and projecting occipital bone, ossified auditory bulla, and short ear canal. Despite being elongated, the skull of Dichobune is not also narrowed since its cerebral region is both swollen and globular. The squamous part of the occipital bone is lengthy and the sagittal crest is easily identifiable. The parietal bones are extensive in size, making up for nearly the entirety of the cerebral region's side walls and appearing swollen in their front areas then tightened in their back areas. The squamosal bone is also elongated, thus having a lengthy appearance on the upper skull. The skull's upper surface contains a squamosal-occipital suture. The frontal bone is both elongated and wide. The lacrimal bones within the orbits are extensive and have mostly triangular shapes. The nasal bones appear to be very narrow, occupying a considerable amount of space between the frontal bone and maxilla.

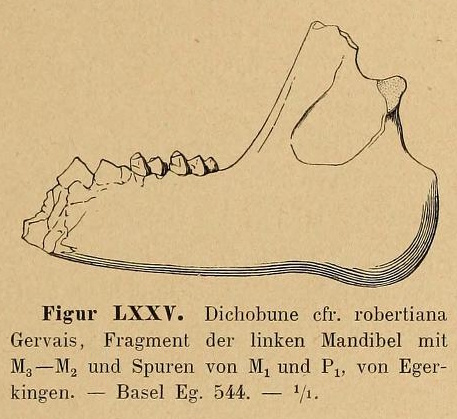
Drawn mandible of D. cf. robertiana

The skull's large orbits appear straight in their upper edges, aligning with the sagittal crest. The floor of the orbit is characterized by an extension of the lacrimal bone and especially the frontal bone. The lacrimal foramen of the lacrimal bone is large and opens up within the orbit itself. The jugal bone extends forward to the halfway point of the first upper molar's mesiodistal diameter. The squamosal bone has a sharp peak that extends from the occipital crest to the zygomatic arch's beginning, creating a cover for the ear canal. The infraorbital canal opens up above the middle surface of the third upper premolar. The surface of the occipital bone is high and narrow; it is formed by the supraoccipital, exoccipital, and portions of the mastoid part of the temporal bone and squamosal. The supraoccipital's middle area has a wide ridge that appears angular. The paroccipital process on the exoccipital is wide. The foramen magnum has a larger width than length and a convex upper edge leaning towards the skull's upper surface. The upper edge of the occipital condyle is roughly at the same height as that of the foramen magnum. Dichobune has a primitive "mastoid" form, in which the periotic bone of the ear is exposed to the skull's surface. The palatine bones are wide.

The auditory region, according to Stehlin, is more reminiscent of those of carnivorans than of ruminants or Cainotherium but overall lacks any modern analogue. The paramastoid process of the exoccipital bone, located behind the postglenoid process of the temporal bone, is strongly developed. The auditory bulla is hidden, small, and pear-shaped, its tip being pointed forward. A thin temporal process covers the mastoid part of the temporal bone.

The horizontal ramus of the mandible (or its body) is slender while the vertical ramus is elongated and wide. Within the horizontal ramus of D. cf. robertiana is a sharp and concave curve in between the mandibular condyle and the angle of the mandible, marking a transition point.

=== Endocast anatomy ===
==== Ear mophology ====
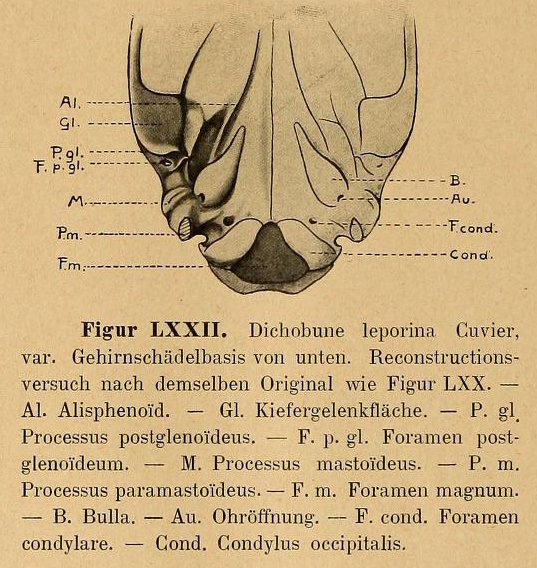
Illustration of the braincase of D. leporina with labels

Several dichobunoid species had their ear petrosal endocasts studied using virtual 3D extractions, including D. leporina. The promontory of the tympanic cavity is oval-shaped, lacks both the transpromontorial and stapedial sulci, and appears flat except for the area anterior (front) to the round window that is convex. On the promontory's front area and in between the epitympanic wing and a lateral (side) process by it are two hollowings (or depressions) that are roughly equal in size. The oval window is also oval-shaped and separated from the rounded and weak round window by the crista interfenestralis. The fossa of the tensor tympani muscle is both large and wide in appearance. The hiatus for the greater petrosal nerve, a hole within the petrous part of the temporal bone, is very small and is located anterior to the tensor tympani muscle's fossa. The tympanic cavity is mild in form, has a small and knob-shaped tuberosity and has a small anterior process on it.

Like in the petrosals of its dichobunoid relatives (i.e. Diacodexis, Homacodon, and Acotherulum), the petrosal of Dichobune contains a tympanic wing that forms a sharp and forward-facing projection with a side process near it; this process is not known in other extant or extinct artiodactyls. The dichobunoids also lack an opening to the carotid canal (or carotid foramen). The mastoid part of the temporal bone is relatively large in dichobunoids that is well-exposed in the ventral (or abdominal) side of the skull. However, its exposure on the temporal bone side was probably very limited in the case of Dichobune.

==== Brain ====
D. leporina has a known brain endocast that was first studied by Colette Dechaseaux in the later 20th century. Unlike with several other basal artiodactyls like Mouillacitherium, Cebochoerus, and Amphimeryx, the brain of Dichobune is slightly less simple due to an additional small groove on the neocortex, in which the suprasylvian sulcus (or suprasylvia) extends farther from the rhinal region. Among the traits making the fissuring of Dichobune more complex includes a visible presylvia fissure on the neocortex's upper side. The neocortex's gyrus patterns observed in the brains of aforementioned artiodactyls are similar to that observed in Dichobune, but the latter also has a few specific gyrus morphologies that set it apart from them. The neocortex, in relation to the wider cerebrum, is moderately extensive like in the other basal artiodactyls Mouillacitherium, Diacodexis, and Homacodon. The neocortical surface area of the brain (neopallium surface/cerebrum surface) covers 44.2% of the brain total, on par with its dichobunoid relatives.

The olfactory bulbs of Dichobune are moderate in size like several of its relatives like Cebochoerus and Dichobune; it is smaller than in the primitive Diacodexis and larger than that of the cainothere Caenomeryx. In Dichobune, the bulbs compose 13.8% of the brain's total volume. The cerebellar vermis, relative to the cerebellum, is large like in other early artiodactyls like Diacodexis and Indohyus.

=== Dentition ===
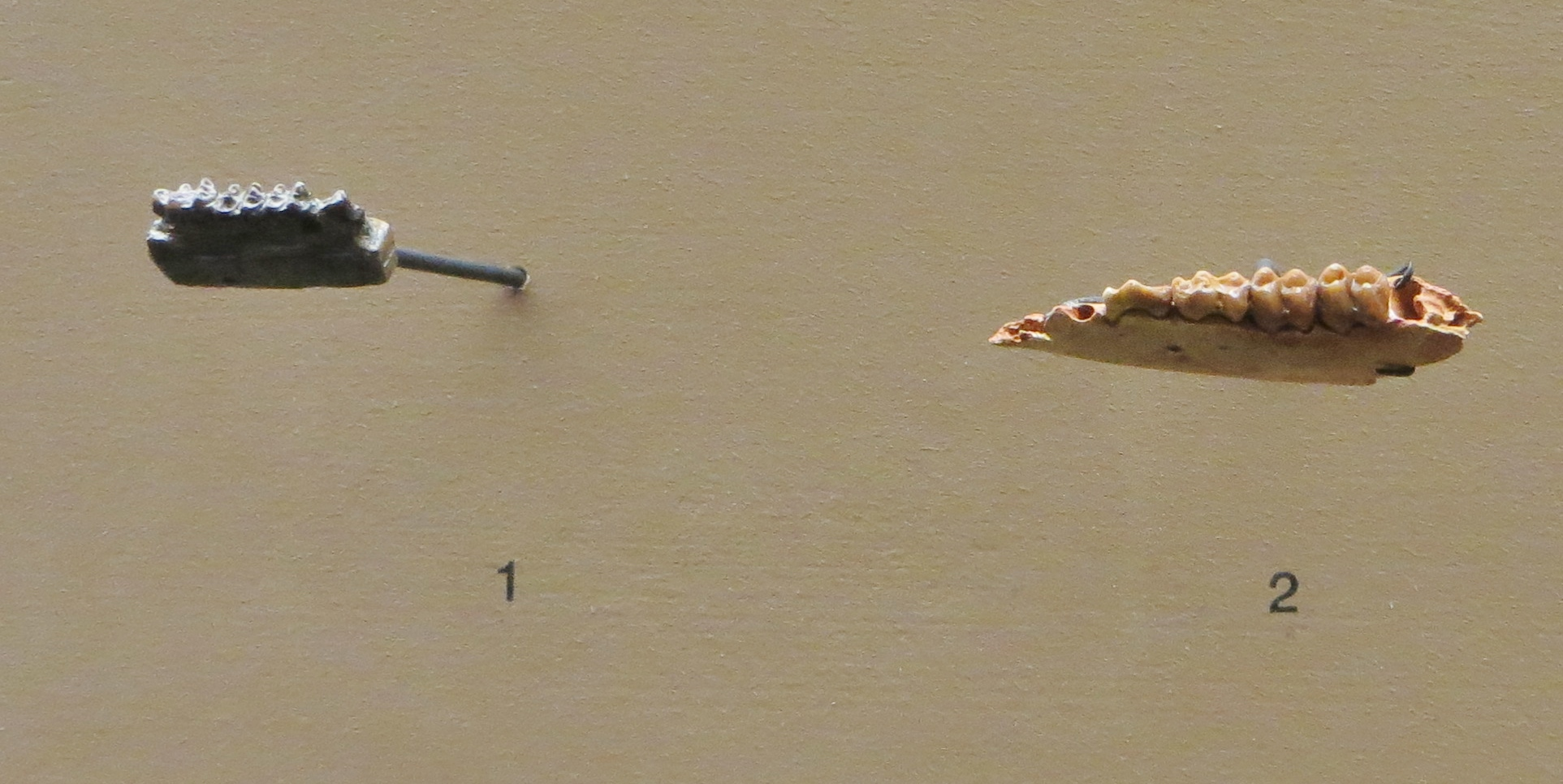
Dental remains of D. robertiana (left) and D. leporina (right), Natural History Museum of Basel

Dichobunoids are known for having the complete dental formula of 3.1.4.33.1.4.3 for a total of 44 teeth, consistent with the primitive dental formula for early-middle Palaeogene placental mammals. This is the case for genera of the Dichobunidae like Dichobune, whose teeth are not much separated by diastemata and are bunodont (low and rounded cusps). Except for some of the oldest genera, dichobunids are also described as having molars (M/m) that generally have five to six tubercles (or cusps) each. The Dichobuninae is described as having unspecialized and rounded dentition, although it is more bunodont than in the earlier Diacodexeidae. In the upper premolars (P/p), the metaconule cusp is larger than the paraconule cusp. P^{3} has a protocone cusp while P_{4} has a metaconid cusp. P_{1} is premolariform in shape. The upper molars in dichobunines usually have three wide distal cusps along with a hypocone cusp. Within the six-cusped molars, the paracone, metacone, protocone, and metaconule cusps are the major types present while the paraconule and hypocone cusps are the secondary ones.

Dichobune has been defined as both brachyodont (low-crowned) and bunodont in dentition, although D. leporina has higher crowns in comparison to its earlier relatives. In Dichobune, the lower incisors (I/i) are thin and sharp and the premolars are simple in form, the latter of which all have a paraconid cusp and metaconid cusp individually. The upper molars (M/m) are quadrangular in shape and have six bunodont tubercles (except for M^{3} with five of them). Three of the upper molar cusps are positioned in a mesially (centred) while three others are within distal positions. The buccal side cusps are crested. The paracone cusp is as large as the metacone cusp. The lower molars are made up of four cuspids, including two lingual ones that are globular in shape and one buccal ones that have slight crescent-shaped ridges developed on them. The metaconid cusp on them is large and usually swollen in its front area, and the entoconid is separate from the enamel ridges between it. The talonid basin region lacks a preentocristid crest on it.

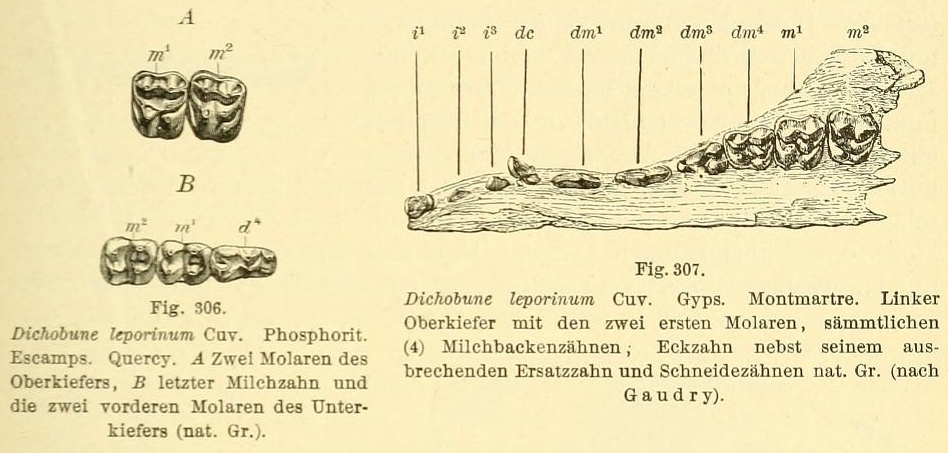
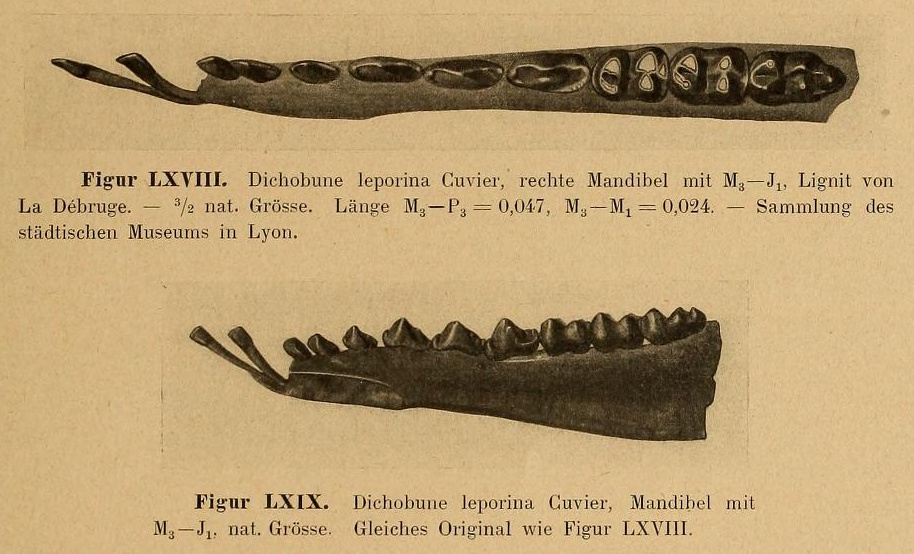
Illustrations of the upper (left) and lower (right) dentitions of D. leporina. The right-sided upper jaw on the left image contains milk teeth.

The dentitions of Dichobune species are very similar to each other, with the few differences coming down mainly to the morphologies of the lower dentition and, in the case of D. leporina, the infrequent occurrence of diastemata in between the premolars. The early representative, D. aff. robertiana from the French localities of Aumelas and Saint-Martin-de-Londres, has primitive morphologies in the forms of simple-patterned premolars and smaller upper molars. Dichobune shows a progressive molarization of its premolars evolutionarily. D. sigei, which appears later than D. robertiana, retains primitive bunodont molars while the later D. leporina shows more derived dental traits, such as sharpened premolars, lessened tubercles on the upper molars, and the presence of small diastemata between them. The presence of small diastemata in between the premolars and canines (C/c) are also recorded in D. jehennei, but they can also range from large to absent. The presence of diastemata coincides with the more elongated snouts in later species, particularly with D. jehennei. The canines are small and are of premolariform shape. While Dichobune (more specifically D. robertiana) shares dental traits with the basal dichobunid Messelobunodon, the two have distinct dentition to the point where the former may have not descended from the former, contrary to earlier hypotheses. Like in another dichobunoid Helohyus, the bunodont upper molars of Dichobune appear to be basal conditions due to the presence of a hypocone cusp in each tooth to enlarge their functions and rounded cusps; these traits set them apart from the more pointed cusps like in the later artiodactyl Gobiohyus or a transition between bunodont and selenodont (crescent-like ridges) dentition like in the early anthracothere Elomeryx.

The dental morphologies of Dichobune and Metriotherium suggest that the former genus split into at least two different evolutionary branches that existed by the Oligocene, with one potentially ending in D. jehennei and the other descending into Metriotherium. Another Oligocene dichobunine Synaphodus (its specific temporal range unknown), more bunodont in dentition than Metriotherium (the latter of which had selenodont dentition), was probably close in evolutionary affinity to D. leporina, although the relation of Synaphodus to Metriotherium is unclear due to the lack of known upper dentition of the former.

=== Postcranial skeleton ===
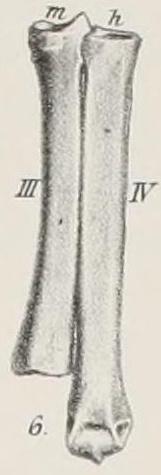
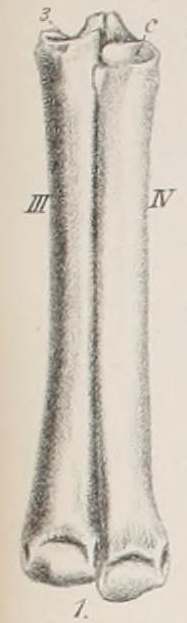
1886 illustrations of metacarpal digits III-IV (left) and metatarsal digits III-IV (right) of D. leporina

In contrast to their "condylarth" ancestors, the earliest artiodactyls, namely the dichobunoids, have more adaptations in their postcranial skeleton towards cursoriality. For instance, their limb bones tend to be slender, and the pronation and supination mobilities of the feet are reduced based on the morphologies of the radius and ulna. Additionally, the hindlimbs tend to be longer than the forelimbs. The metapodials, long bones of the feet, are both elongated and paraxonic, the latter of which means that the feet bear equal weight on the third and fourth digits in particular. The first digit is reduced. In comparison to later artiodactyls, however, their postcranial skeletons generally are relatively unspecialized due to the unfused metapodials, unfused carpal bones and tarsal bones, a long tail, and the presence of all five digits. Despite this, dichobunines have stockier builds than the smaller dichobunoids like Diacodexis and Eurodexis, giving the former group a more carnivoran-like build. While earlier artiodactyls like Diacodexis, Messelobunodon, and Homacodon retain five metacarpal bones, Dichobune does not. Instead, D. leporina has four digits total (digits II to V). The third and fourth metapodials (parts of digits III and IV) remain well-developed and therefore are long. Digits II and V, in comparison, are still retained but are somewhat shorter and are no longer functional for movement. The morphology of the humerus suggests that the forearm was highly mobile.

The foot bones of D. leporina had previously been illustrated by Georges Cuvier as noted by the German palaeontologist Max Schlosser in 1886 and have been lost since. According to one of Cuvier's drawings depicting the articulated front foot bones, the middle digits are not fused with each other, and the two side digits have been heavily reduced. The phalanx bones on them are retained but are very small. The trapezoid bone articulates to MC II (second metacarpal) while the capitate bone connects to MC III. The trapezium bone appears to be missing. The ulna and the radius of the front legs, along with the fibula and tibia of the back legs, are separate from each other. Schlosser also said that the middle metacarpals were about 70% as long as the middle metatarsal bones. The morphology of the foot bones of Dichobune were close in resemblance to those of other dichobunoids like Diacodexis and Messelobunodon, although today the former's postcranial fossils are only known from old illustrations and descriptions.

=== Size ===
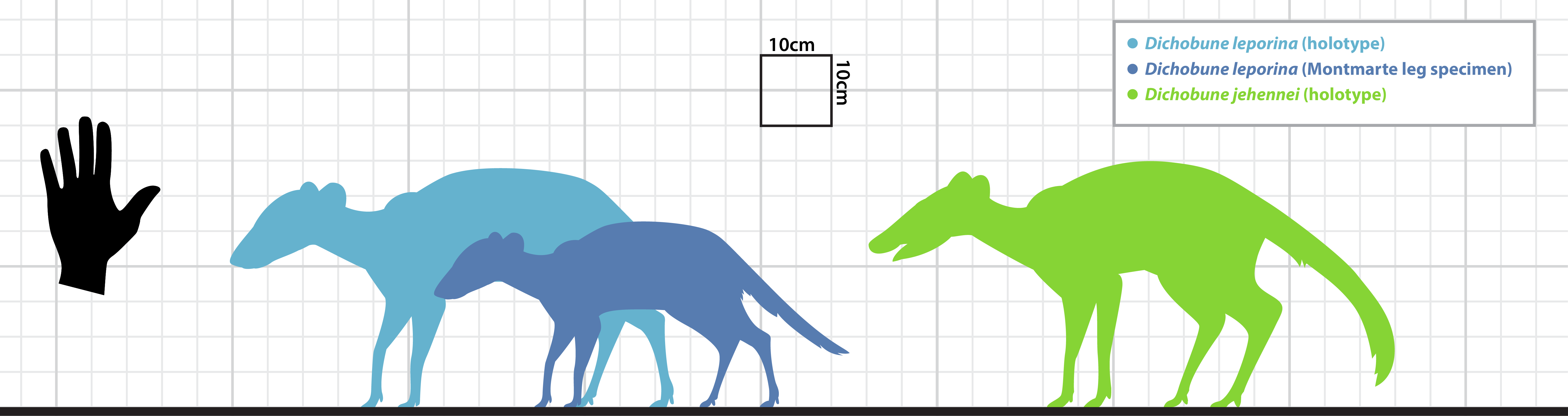
Estimated size comparison of D. leporina and D. jehennei based on known fossil material

The Dichobuninae is described as consisting of larger dichobunids; Dichobune in particular is recorded as being medium compared to its close relatives. Its close relatives and possible descendants Synaphodus and Metriotherium are diagnosed as being larger dichobunids in comparison. The earliest species D. robertiana is small in size. D. sigei is a small-sized species of Dichobune, moreso than D. cf. robertiana from Egerkingen. D. fraasi is smaller than D. leporina, the latter of which is large-sized. D. jehennei, the latest known species of Dichobune, is larger than D. leporina. The skull of D. jehennei measures 130 mm (5.1 in) in length while its bizygomtic width is 61 mm (2.4 in) wide. In regard to dental row lengths, P^{2} - M^{3} of D. jehennei measures 51 mm (2.0 in). Whereas P_{2} - M_{3} of D. leporina reaches 50 mm (2.0 in) in length, that of D. jehennei can measure 59.6 mm (2.35 in) in length.

The estimated body mass of D. leporina has been calculated by Helder Gomes Rodrigues et al. in 2019 based on the length of M_{1}, yielding 4.6 kg (10 lb). The body mass estimate is considerably larger than in the earlier dichobunid Messelobunodon, whose estimates yielded 1.27 kg (2.8 lb) from M_{1} and 0.735 kg (1.62 lb) from an astragalus. The body mass formula based on astragali was previously established by Jean-Noël Martinez and Sudre in 1995 for Palaeogene artiodactyls, although Dichobune was not included in the initial study.

== Palaeobiology ==
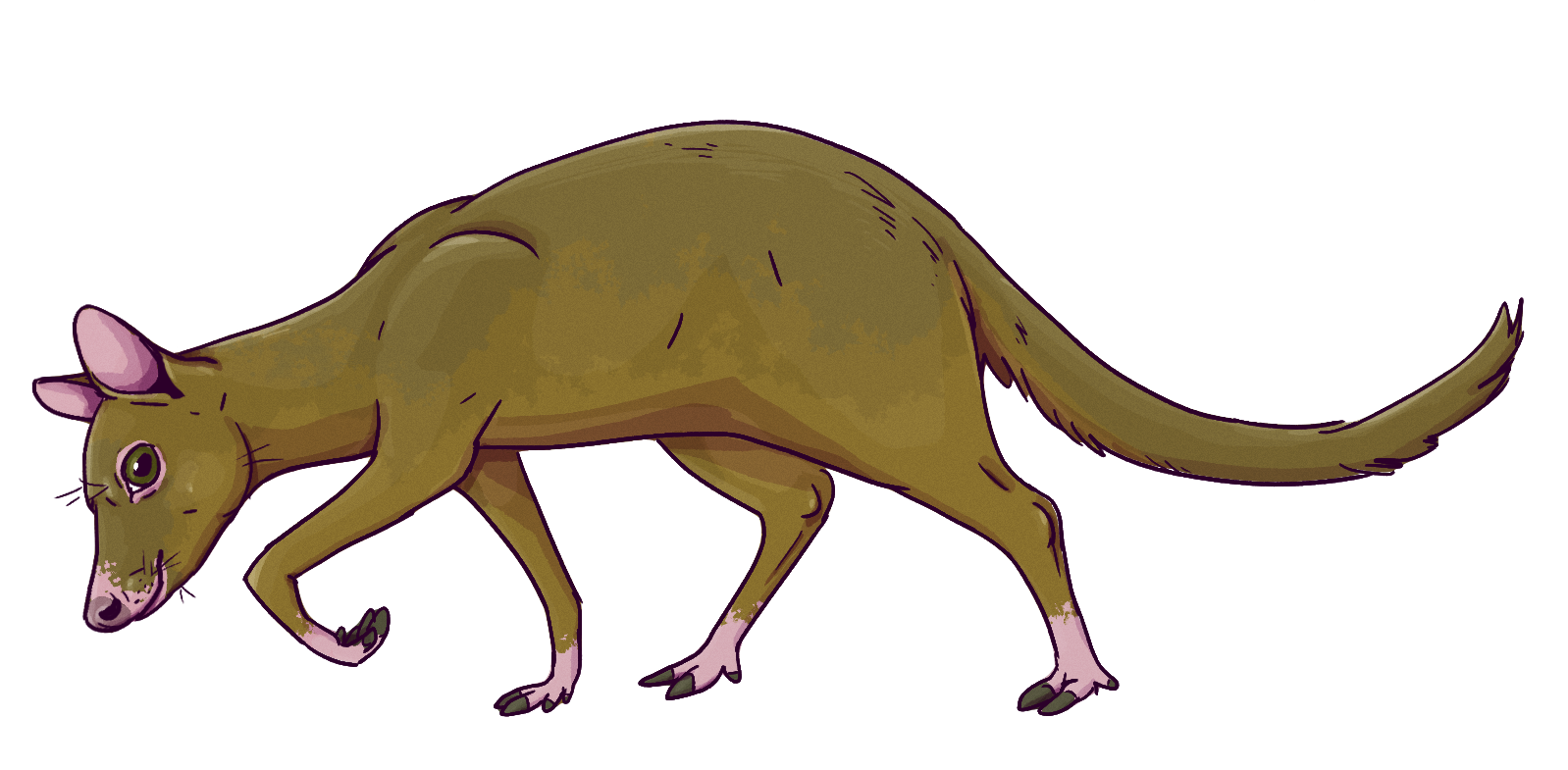
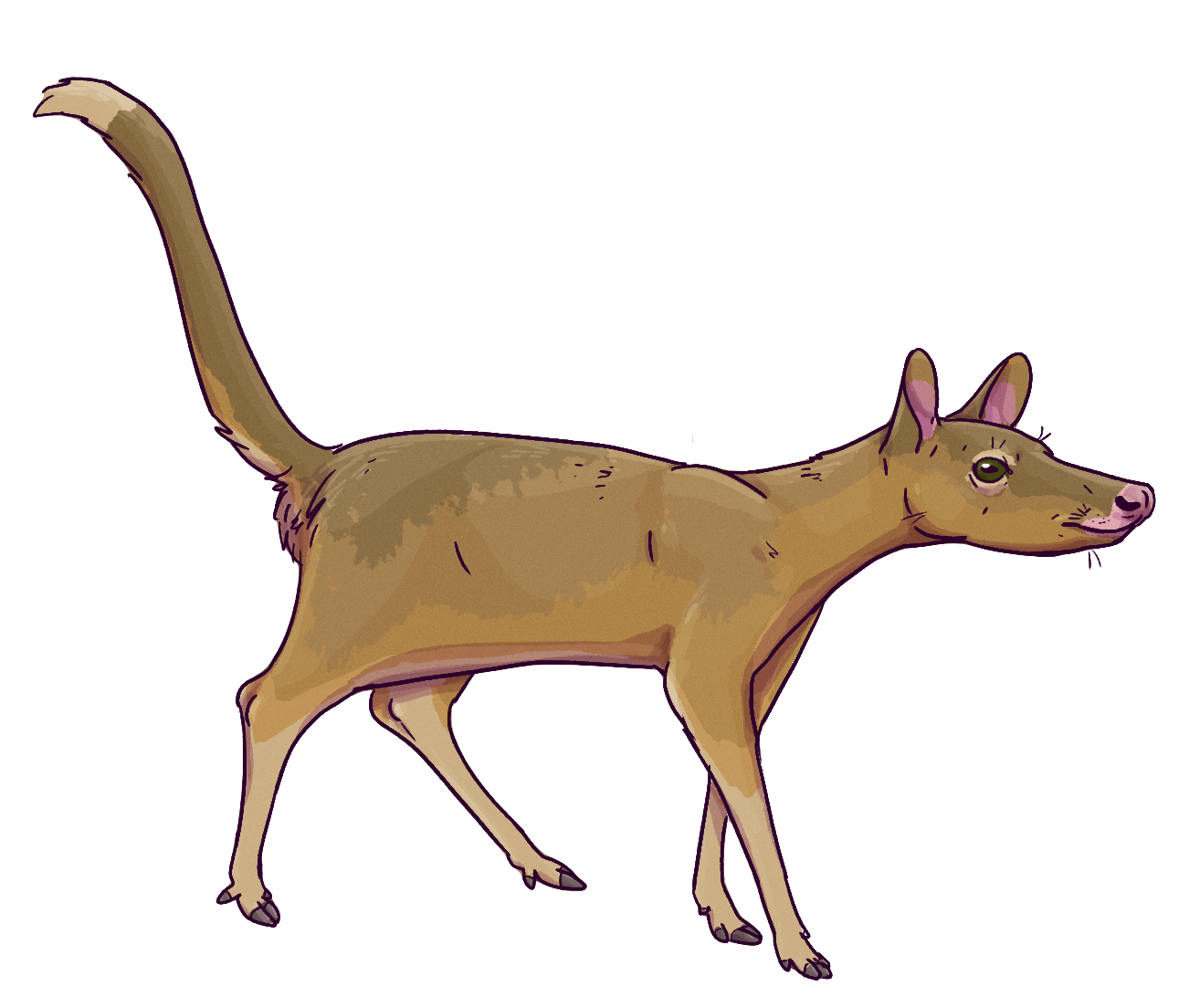
Restorations of D. leporina (left) and D. jehennei (right) based on known fossil material

The Dichobuninae is thought by researchers to have a very different morphology from its other dichobunoid relatives. This is evident by the dichobunines having stockier body builds like in carnivorans, traits known also in the European endemic families Cebochoeridae and Choeropotamidae; this, along with the dental morphologies, may imply more suid-like feeding habits as opposed to the Diacodexeidae. The dentitions of the dichobunines, according to Jessica M. Theodor et al., suggest omnivorous to herbivorous diets.

Based on his studies on the dentitions of D. cf. robertiana and other early artiodactyls, Leonie C. Schwermann hypothesized that Dichobune and Gobiohyus are part of a cranial and dental morphotype in which the jaw's chewing movements (power stroke) would have been similar to the basal Diacodexis but differed by the facets on the hypocone that seemingly made chewing functions more efficient. The hypocone itself has no direct impact on how either genera chew, however. A frugivorous diet is assumed in Dichobune, meaning that it probably consumed higher proportions of the likes of fruit, seeds, and nuts. In comparison, leaves probably formed only minor components of its dietary habits. This type of feeding habit would have differed from that of another early dichobunid Messelobunodon, whose fossilized gut contents revealed that it had mixed diets consisting of fungi, seeds, and leaves. The crushing functions of the molars needed for frugivorous diets is supported by the more rounded cusps and the increased crushing efficiencies from the hypocones.

== Palaeoecology ==
=== Early to Middle Eocene ===
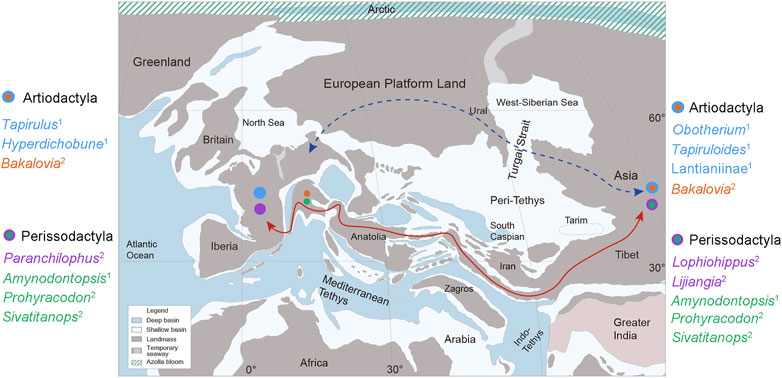
Palaeogeography of Europe and Asia during the Middle Eocene with possible artiodactyl and perissodactyl dispersal routes.

For much of the Eocene, a hothouse climate with humid, tropical environments with consistently high precipitations prevailed. Modern mammalian orders including the Perissodactyla, Artiodactyla, and Primates (or the suborder Euprimates) appeared already by the Early Eocene, diversifying rapidly and developing dentitions specialized for folivory. The omnivorous forms mostly either switched to folivorous diets or went extinct by the Middle Eocene (47–37 Ma) along with the archaic "condylarths". By the Late Eocene (approx. 37–33 mya), most of the ungulate form dentitions shifted from bunodont (or rounded) cusps to cutting ridges (i.e. lophs) for folivorous diets.

Land connections between western Europe and North America were interrupted around 53 Ma. From the Early Eocene up until the Grande Coupure extinction event (56–33.9 mya), western Eurasia was separated into three landmasses: western Europe (an archipelago), Balkanatolia (in-between the Paratethys Sea of the north and the Neotethys Ocean of the south), and eastern Eurasia. The Holarctic mammalian faunas of western Europe were therefore mostly isolated from other landmasses including Greenland, Africa, and eastern Eurasia, allowing for endemism to develop. Therefore, the European mammals of the Late Eocene (MP17–MP20 of the Mammal Palaeogene zones) were mostly descendants of endemic Middle Eocene groups.

The earliest representative of Dichobune is D. aff. robertiana from the French localities of Aumelas and Saint-Martin-de-Londres; both of these localities are dated between MP10 and MP12. According to Floréal Solé et al., the presence of certain hyaenodont genera suggests that Aumelas is closest to the MP10 and MP11 levels. The MP11 unit records the likes of other members of the artiodactyl families Dichobunidae and "Diacodexeidae" along with the Hyaenodonta (Hyaenodontidae), Tillodontia (Esthonychidae), Pholidota (Eurotamanduidae), and Perissodactyla (Palaeotheriidae, Hyrachyidae, and Lophiodontidae). Specific genera recorded from Aumelas along with Dichobune include the sebecosuchian Iberosuchus, testudine Landreatchelys, amphilemurid Macrocranion, bat Stehlinia, hyaenodontids Matthodon and Leonhardtina, dichobunid Aumelasia, lophiodont Lophiodon, palaeotheres Propalaeotherium and Pachynolophus, and the herpetotheriid Amphiperatherium. It was after MP12 that a faunal turnover occurred, marking shifts in new ungulate faunas amidst cooling global temperates that occurred after the Early Eocene Climatic Optimum.

D. robertiana is recorded from multiple localities dating to MP13 and D. cf. robertiana at MP14. The primate subfamily Adapinae and artiodactyl representatives of the Tapirulidae, Choeropotamidae, Cebochoeridae, Mixtotheriidae, and Anoplotheriidae made their first appearances at MP13 as did the Amphimerycidae and Xiphodontidae at MP14. The stratigraphic ranges of Dichobune, starting at MP13, also overlapped with metatherians (Herpetotheriidae), cimolestans (Pantolestidae, Paroxyclaenidae), rodents (Ischyromyidae, Theridomyoidea, Gliridae), eulipotyphlans, bats, apatotherians, carnivoraformes (Miacidae), and hyaenodonts (Hyainailourinae, Proviverrinae). D. robertiana is recorded from the La Défense, dating to MP13, along with the lophiodont Lophiodon, cebochoerids Cebochoerus and Gervachoerus, mixtothere Mixtotherium, and the other dichobunids Meniscodon and Hyperdichobune.

MP16, as evident by the localities of Lavergne and Le Bretou in France, marks the only known appearance of D. sigei. Also recorded from Le Bretou, for instance, are the herpetotheriids Amphiperatherium and Peratherium, pseudorhyncocyonid Leptictidium, nyctitheriids Cryptotopos and Saturninia, notharctid Anchomomys, omomyid Necrolemur, rodents (Elfomys, Glamys, Paradelomys, Remys, Sciuroides), bats (Carcinipteryx, Hipposideros, Palaeophyllophora, Vaylatsia), proviverrine Allopterodon, carnivoraformes Quercygale and Paramiacis, palaeotheres (Anchilophus, Plagiolophus, Palaeotherium), lophiodont Lophiodon, cebochoerids Acotherulum and Cebochoerus, anoplotheriids (Catodontherium, Dacrytherium, Robiatherium), dichobunid Mouillacitherium, amphimerycid Pseudamphimeryx, robiacinid Robiacina, tapirulid Tapirulus, and xiphodonts (Xiphodon, Dichodon, and Haplomeryx).

After MP16, a faunal turnover occurred, marking the disappearances of the lophiodonts and European hyrachyids as well as the extinctions of all European crocodylomorphs except for the alligatoroid Diplocynodon. The causes of the faunal turnover have been attributed to a shift from humid and highly tropical environments to drier and more temperate forests with open areas and more abrasive vegetation. The surviving herbivorous faunas shifted their dentitions and dietary strategies accordingly to adapt to abrasive and seasonal vegetation. The environments were still subhumid and full of subtropical evergreen forests, however. The Palaeotheriidae was the sole remaining European perissodactyl group, and frugivorous-folivorous or purely folivorous artiodactyls became the dominant group in western Europe.

=== Late Eocene ===
The Late Eocene unit MP18 records the appearances of two Dichobune species: D. leporina and D. fraasi. Both species extend beyond the Late Eocene, which ends at MP20-MP21. In the Late Eocene, the Cainotheriidae and the derived anoplotheriids Anoplotherium and Diplobune both made their first fossil record appearances by MP18. In addition, several migrant mammal groups had reached western Europe by MP17a-MP18, namely the Anthracotheriidae, Hyaenodontinae, and Amphicyonidae. In addition to snakes, frogs, and salamandrids, rich assemblage of lizards are known in western Europe as well from MP16-MP20, representing the Iguanidae, Lacertidae, Gekkonidae, Agamidae, Scincidae, Helodermatidae, and Varanoidea, most of which were able to thrive in the warm temperatures of western Europe.

The MP19 French locality of Escamps indicates that D. leporina coexisted with a variety of other mammals including the herpetotheriids Peratherium and Amphiperatherium, pseudorhyncocyonid Pseudorhyncocyon, nyctitheres Saturninia and Amphidozotherium, bats (Hipposideros, Vaylatsia Stehlinia), rodents (Glamys, Sciuroides, Paradelomys, Blainvillimys, Theridomys, and Patriotheridomys), omomyid Microchoerus, adapid Palaeolemur, hyainailourine Pterodon, amphicyonid Cynodictis, palaeotheres Palaeotherium and Plagiolophus, choeropotamid Choeropotamus, anoplotheriids (Anoplotherium, Diplobune, and Dacrytherium), cainothere Oxacron, amphimerycid Amphimeryx, and xiphodonts (Xiphodon, Dichodon, and Haplomeryx.

=== Grande Coupure ===
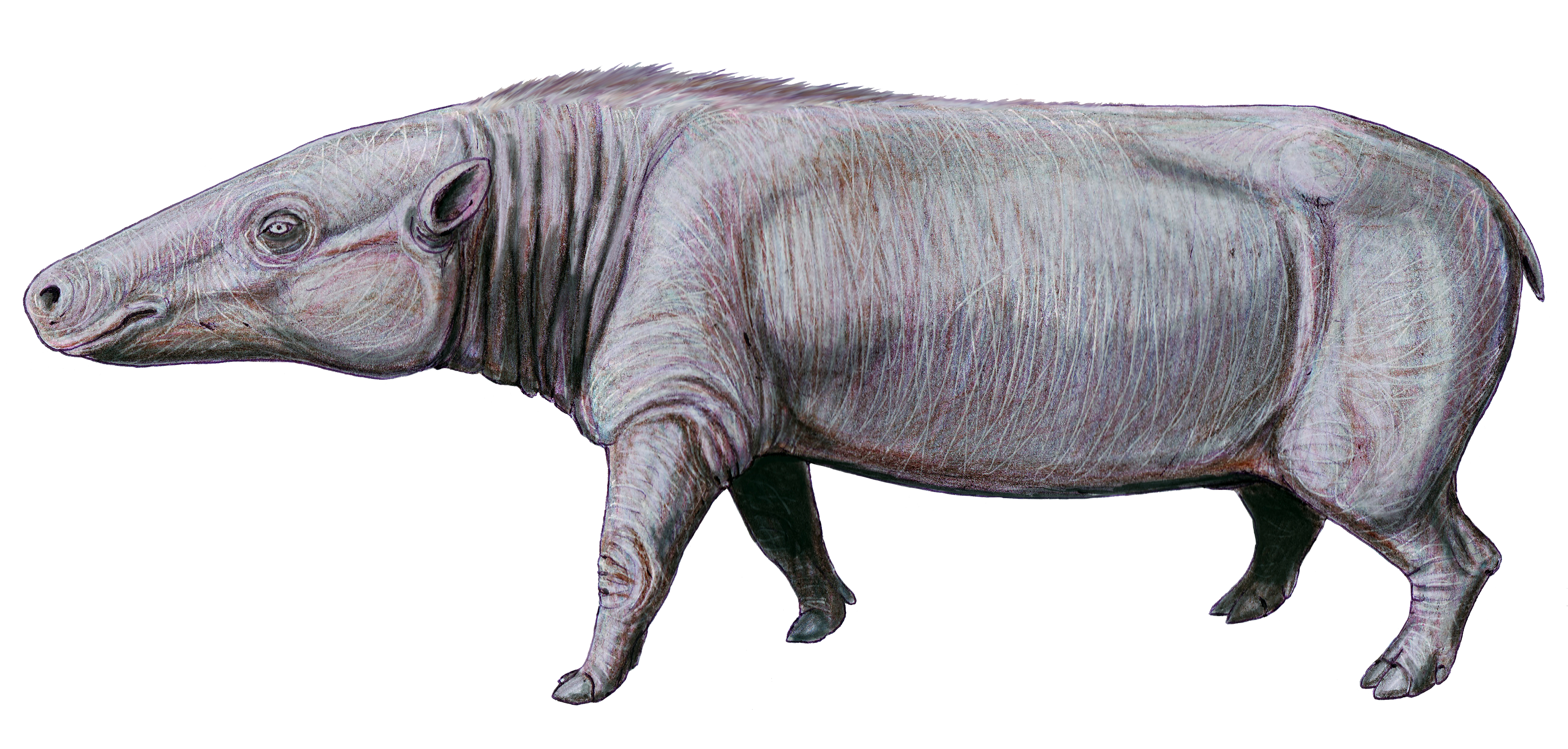
Restoration of Anthracotherium magnum, an anthracothere genus that arrived in western Europe by the Grande Coupure

The Grande Coupure event of western Europe is well-recognized in the palaeontological record as one of the largest extinction and faunal turnover events in the Cenozoic era. The event is coincident with climate forcing events of cooler and more seasonal climates, the result being a 60% extinction rate of western European mammalian lineages while Asian faunal immigrants replaced them. The Grande Coupure is often marked by palaeontologists as part of the Eocene-Oligocene boundary as a result at 33.9 Ma, although some estimate that the event began 33.6-33.4 Ma. The event correlates directly with or after the Eocene-Oligocene transition, an abrupt shift from a greenhouse world characterizing much of the Paleogene to a coolhouse/icehouse world of the early Oligocene onwards. The massive drop in temperatures stems from the first major expansion of the Antarctic ice sheets that caused drastic pCO_{2} decreases and an estimated drop of ~70 m (230 ft) in sea level.

The seaway dynamics separating western Europe from other landmasses to strong extents but allowing for some levels of dispersals prior to the Grande Coupure are complicated and contentious, but many palaeontologists agreed that glaciation and the resulting drops in sea level played major roles in the drying of the seaways previously acting as major barriers to eastern migrants from Balkanatolia and western Europe. The Turgai Strait is often proposed as the main European seaway barrier prior to the Grande Coupure, but some researchers challenged this perception recently, arguing that it completely receded already 37 Ma, long before the Eocene-Oligocene transition. Alexis Licht et al. suggested that the Grande Coupure could have possibly been synchronous with the Oi-1 glaciation (33.5 Ma), which records a decline in atmospheric CO_{2}, boosting the Antarctic glaciation that already started by the Eocene-Oligocene transition. The Oi-1 glaciation, similar to the first glaciation event, caused large drops in sea level and pushed the global climate towards a coolhouse/icehouse environment. The extinctions of a majority of endemic artiodactyls have been attributed to competition with immigrant faunas, environmental changes from cooling climates, or some combination of the two.

The earliest Oligocene marked the arrivals of later anthracotheres, entelodonts, ruminants (Gelocidae, Lophiomerycidae), rhinocerotoids (Rhinocerotidae, Amynodontidae, Eggysodontidae), carnivorans (later Amphicyonidae, Amphicynodontidae, Nimravidae, and Ursidae), eastern Eurasian rodents (Eomyidae, Cricetidae, and Castoridae), and eulipotyphlans (Erinaceidae).

The Grande Coupure saw the extinctions of many artiodactyl genera previously endemic of Europe, including Anoplotherium and all representatives of "choeropotamids" (Amphirhagatherium, Choeropotamus) and xiphodontids (Xiphodon, Dichodon). Several ungulate genera like Palaeotherium and Acotherulum survived the Grande Coupure but nonetheless went extinct by MP21. Both D. leporina and D. fraasi are recorded at MP21 indicating their survivals, the former at Aubrelong 1 in France and the latter at Hoogbutsel in Belgium; D. leporina is not recorded in subsequent units, however.

=== Early Oligocene ===
Although the Eocene-Oligocene transition marked long-term drastic cooling global climates, western Eurasia was still dominated by humid climates, albeit with dry winter seasons in the Oligocene. Europe during the Oligocene had environments largely adapted to winter-dry seasons and humid seasons that were composed of three separate vegetational belts by latitude, with temperate needleleaf-broadleaved or purely broadleaved deciduous forests aligning with the northernmost belt between 40°N and 50°N, the middle belt of warmth-adapted mixed mesophytic and evergreen broadleaved forests aligning between 40°N and 30°N, and the last belt containing tropical vegetation aligning below 30°N.

Two species are recorded from the Early Oligocene unit MP22, which also marks the last occurrence of Dichobune: D. fraasi and D. jehennei. Whereas the latest temporal appearance of D. fraasi is at the French locality of Valbro, D. jehennei has been uncovered from multiple localities within MP22 like Villebramar and La Plante 2. Metriotherium minutum, thought to have descended from a species of Dichobune, is also known to have coexisted with D. jehennei at Villebramar. Among other fossil mammals found there include the cricetid Atavocricetodon, theridomyids Blainvillimys and Elfomys, hyaenodont Hyaenodon, nimravids (Eofelis, Nimravus, and Quercylurus), palaeothere Plagiolophus, eggysodontid Eggysodon, rhinocerotid Ronzotherium, entelodont Entelodon, anthracothere Anthracotherium, gelocid Gelocus, and the lophiomerycid Lophiomeryx.
