= Jaccard =

Jaccard is a surname. Notable people with the surname include:

- Auguste Jaccard (1833–1895), Swiss geologist and paleontologist
- Fernand Jaccard (1907–2008), Swiss footballer
- James Jaccard (born 1949), American psychologist and social work researcher
- Marius Jaccard (1898–1978), Swiss ice hockey player
- Mark Jaccard (born 1955) Canadian economist and academic
- Jacques Jaccard (1886–1960), American director
- Pascal Jaccard (born 1964), 1990 winner of the Swiss bike race Giro del Mendrisiotto
- Paul Jaccard (1868–1944), Swiss botanist and academic
- Richard Alonzo Jaccard (1918–1942), U.S. Navy ensign, USS Jaccard was named after him
- Roland Jaccard (1941–2021), Swiss writer and psychologist
- Francis Jaccard (1745–1862), a Vietnamese Martyr

== See also ==
- Jacquard (disambiguation)
