= Jaccard (disambiguation) =

Jaccard is a surname.

Jaccard may also refer to:

- Jaccard index, a statistic used for gauging the similarity and diversity of sample sets
- Jaccard loom, a power loom attachment that allows the manufacture of intricate patterns
- USS Jaccard (1944–1968), a U.S. Navy destroyer escort

== See also ==
- Jacquard (disambiguation)
