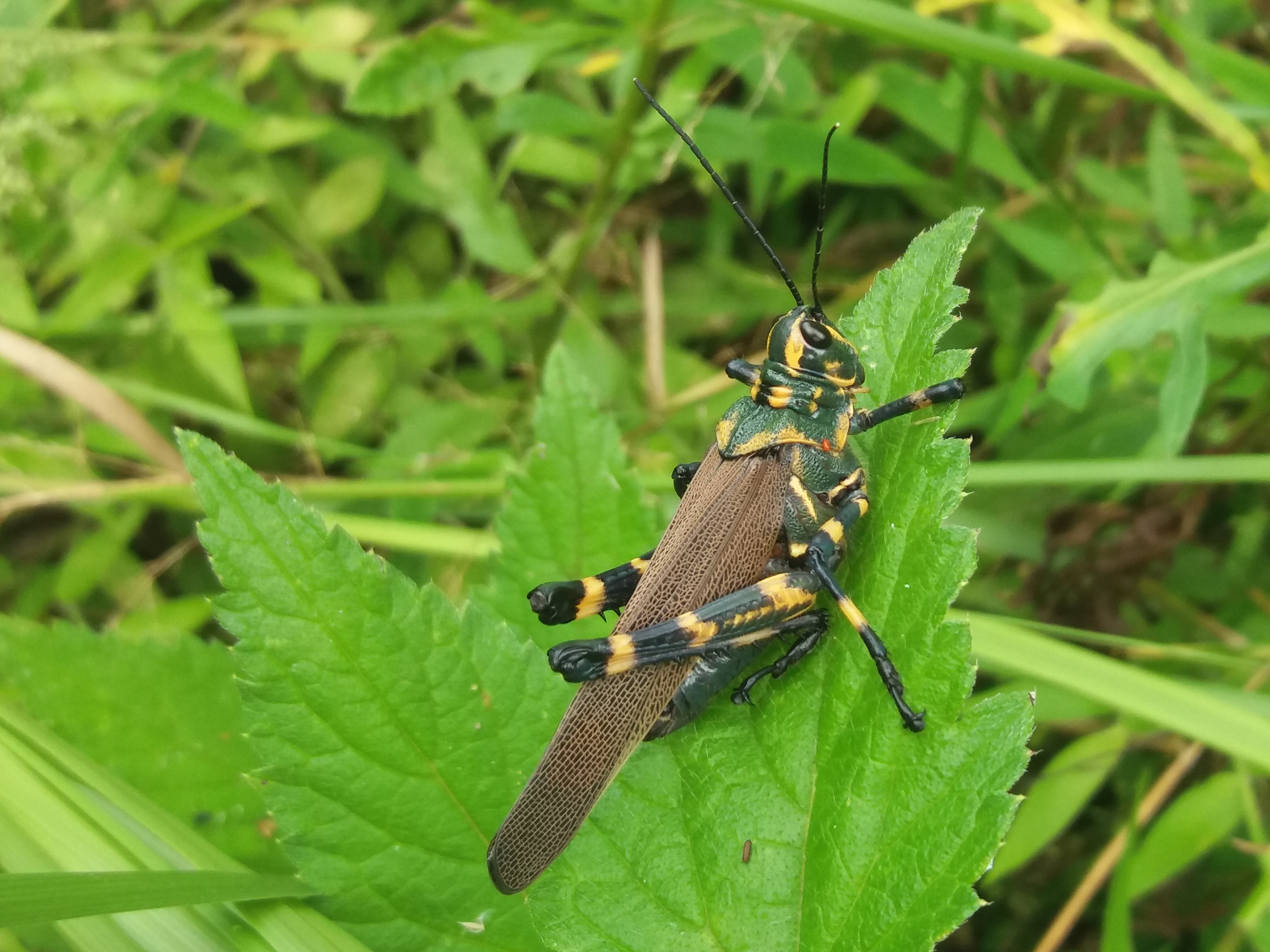

Scientific classification
- Kingdom: Animalia
- Phylum: Arthropoda
- Clade: Pancrustacea
- Class: Insecta
- Order: Orthoptera
- Suborder: Caelifera
- Family: Romaleidae
- Genus: Chromacris
- Species: C. speciosa

Binomial name
- Chromacris speciosa Thunberg, 1824

Synonyms
- Chromacris stolli (Pictet & Saussure, 1887); Rhomalea stolli Pictet & Saussure, 1887; Acridium xanthopterum Hahn, 1836; Gryllus speciosus Thunberg, 1824

= Chromacris speciosa =

Species of insect

Chromacris speciosa, also known as the soldier grasshopper, is a grasshopper belonging to the family Romaleidae. It is distributed across Central America and South America. It was first described in 1824 by Swedish naturalist Carl Peter Thunberg.

== Taxonomy ==
This species belongs to the family Romaleidae which belongs to the suborder Caelifera. There are a few synonyms of Chromacris speciosa including Chromacris stolli, Rhomalea stolli, Acridium xanthopterum, and Gryllus speciosa.

Both the lectotype and syntype of this species were collected in Amapá, Brazil.

== Habitat ==
It has general distribution across South America and Central America. They can be found in countries such as Ecuador (Andes), Colombia, Venezuela, Guyana, eastern Brazil, Peru, Uruguay, Paraguay, and Argentina.

It prefers bush environment with vegetation principally consisting of species in the families such as Solanaceae, Myrtaceae, and Gramineae.

== Description ==
It is a medium-size species with a generally dark green color and orange-red hind wings. Yellow strips can be seen across its body. Nymphs of this species are black and red.

== Gallery ==
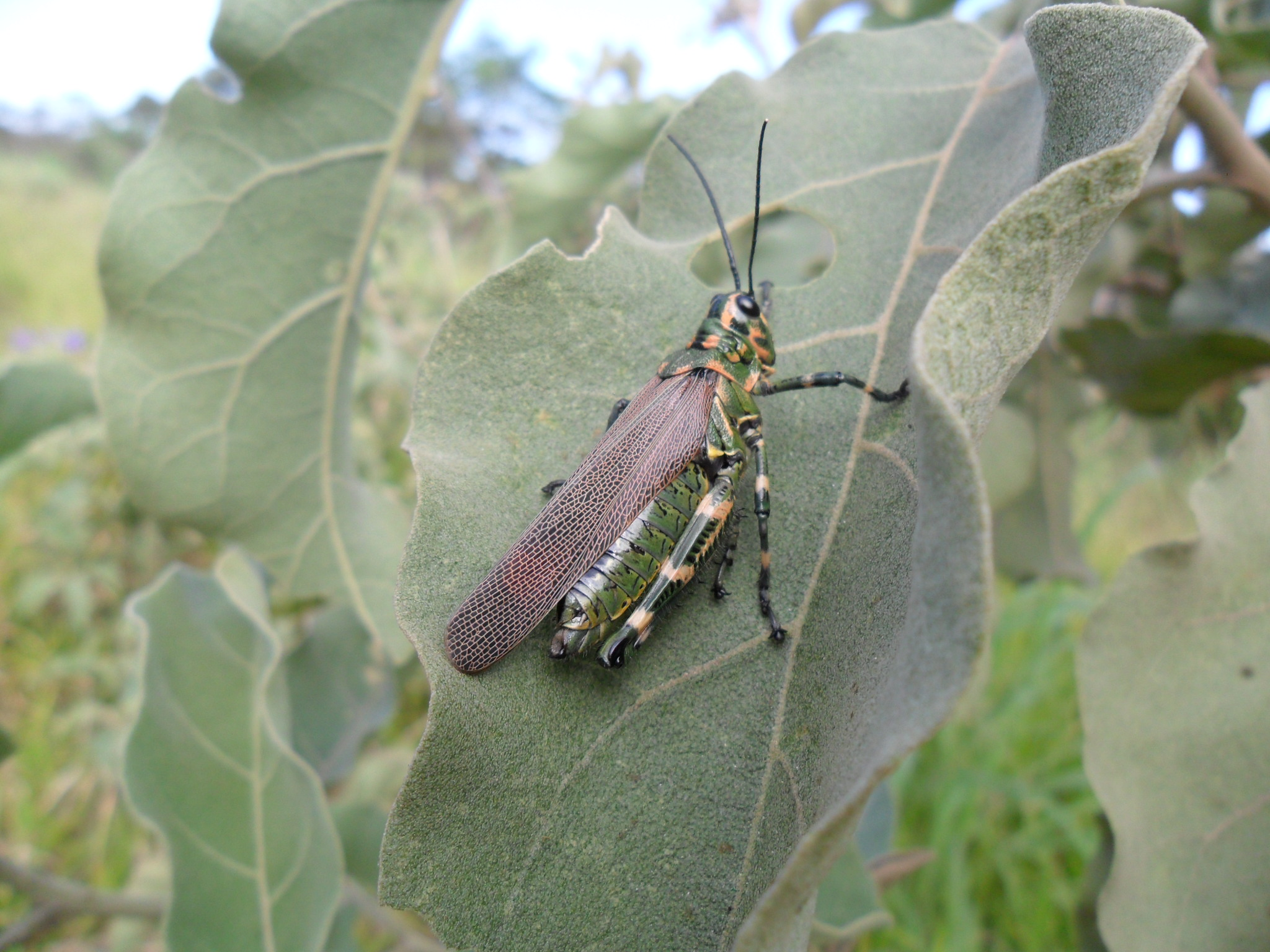

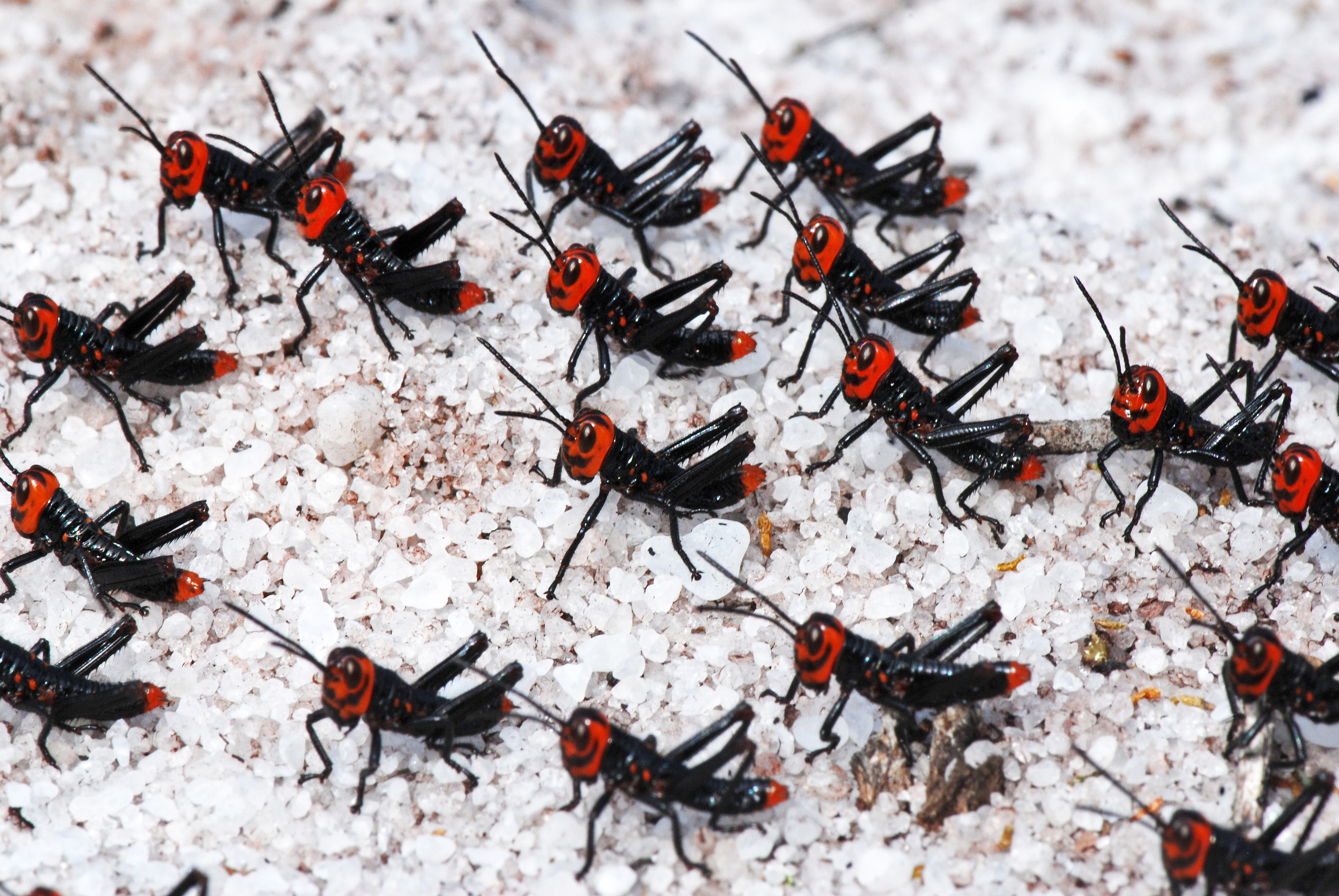
