= Perceval de Loriol =

Swiss paleontologist

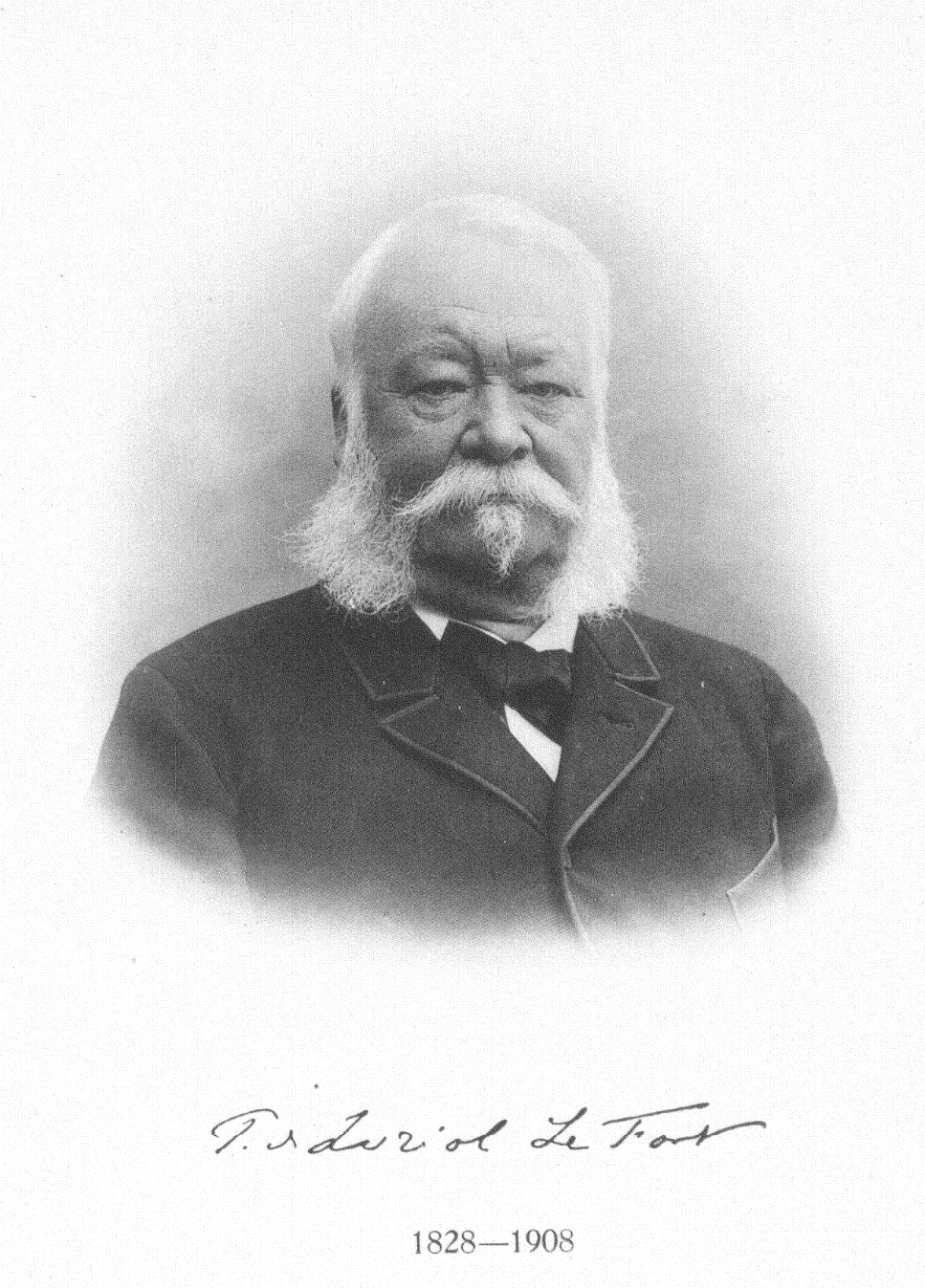
Charles Louis Perceval de Loriol

Charles Louis Perceval de Loriol (24 July 1828, Geneva – 23 December 1908, Cologny) was a Swiss paleontologist and stratigraphist.

He studied natural sciences and paleontology in Geneva as a pupil of François-Jules Pictet. For a period of time, he worked as an estate manager in Geneva and Lorraine, then for nearly forty years was associated with the Natural History Museum of Geneva. He was one of the founders of the Schweizerische Paläontologische Gesellschaft and editor of the Mémoires de la Société suisse paléontologique. In 1902 he received an honorary doctorate from the University of Geneva

He is remembered for his investigations of fossil echinoderms found in Europe and North Africa from the Jurassic, Cretaceous and Upper Tertiary Eras. He was the author of numerous taxa, an example being the crinoid family Bourgueticrinidae (1882).

FAMILY

Of a family originally from Bresse he came from a long line of Calvinist military officers, businessmen and politicians. He was the eldest son of Charles Armand Louis Madelain de Loriol and Sophie de Portes.

He married Louise Sophie Le Fort and had six children:

1) Madeleine Mathilde, 1855-1915, married Marc Lombard

2) Helene, 1858-1930, married Theodore Vernet

3) Charles, 1859-1913, married Cecile Zuber

4) Therese, 1861-1958, married Alfred Bonnard

5) Gabriel, 1866-1924, married Louise Lucie de Loriol

6) Pierre, 1872-1960, married Elizabeth von Mandach.

== Selected works ==
- Description des animaux invertébrés : fossiles contenus dans l'étage néocomien moyen du Mont Salève, 1861 – Description of invertebrates; fossils of the Middle Neocomian stage found at Mount Salève.
- Etude géologique et paléontologique de la formation d'eau douce infracrétacée du Jura et en particulier de Villers-le-lac, 1865, (with Auguste Jaccard) – Geological and paleontological study on the formation of infra-Cretaceous freshwater in the Jura Mountains and in particular, Villers-le-Lac.
- Description géologique et paléontologique des étages jurassiques supérieurs de la Haute Marne, 1872 – Geological and paleontological descriptions of the Upper Jurassic stage in Haute Marne.
- Description des échinodermes tertiaires du Portugal; accompagnée d'un tableau stratigraphique, 1877 – Description of Tertiary echinoderms of Portugal, with a stratigraphic table.
- Monographie des crinoides fossiles de la Suisse, 1877 – Monograph on crinoid fossils of Switzerland.
- Description de quatre échinodermes nouveaux, 1880 – Description of four new echinoderms.
- Notes pour servir à l'étude des échinodermes; seconde série, 1884 – Notes for use in the study of echinoderms.
- Description de la faune jurassique du Portugal; embranchement des échinodermes, 1890 – Description of Jurassic fauna of Portugal; embranchement of echinoderms.
