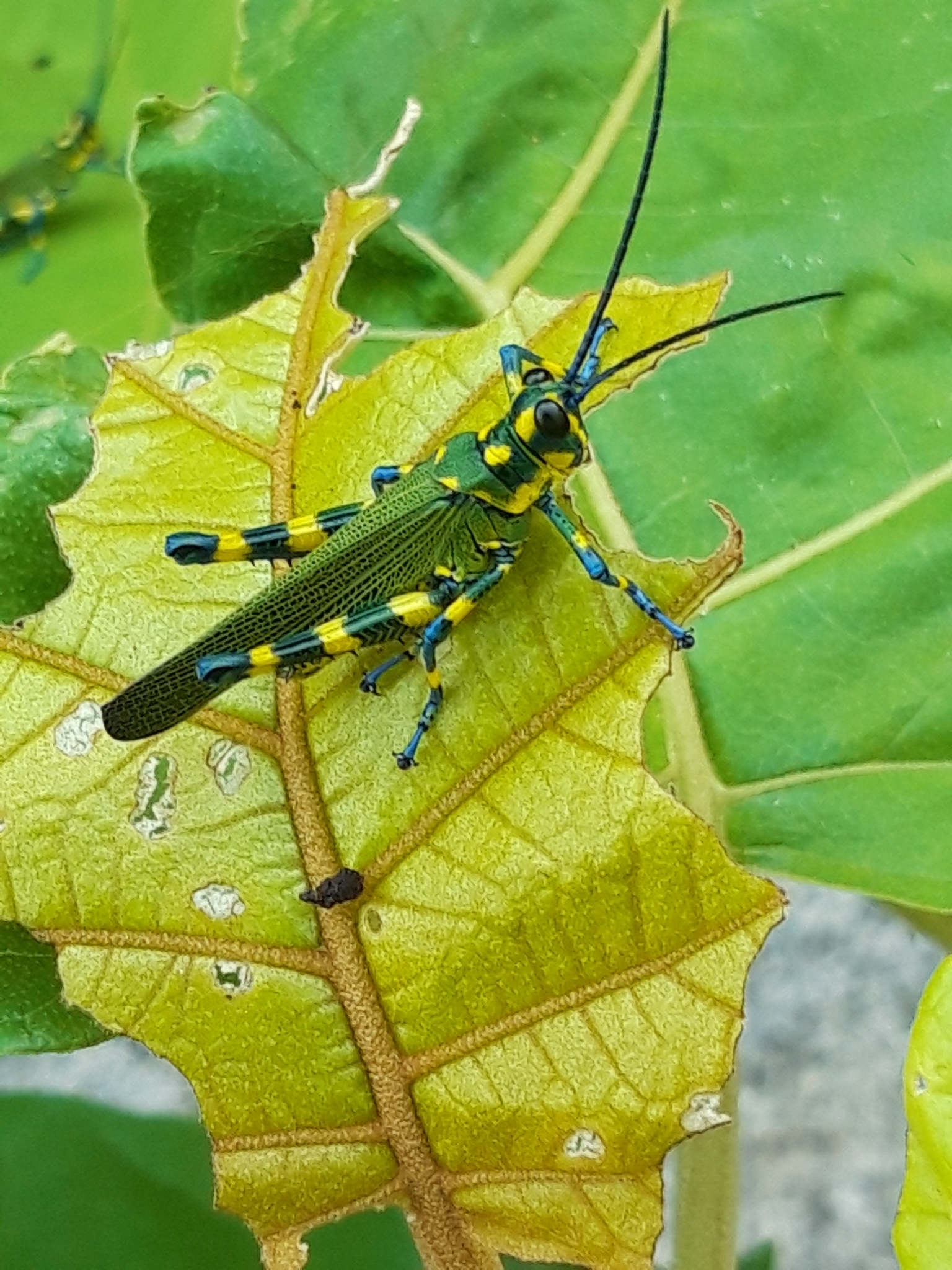

Scientific classification
- Kingdom: Animalia
- Phylum: Arthropoda
- Class: Insecta
- Order: Orthoptera
- Suborder: Caelifera
- Family: Romaleidae
- Genus: Chromacris
- Species: C. psittacus

Binomial name
- Chromacris psittacus (Gerstaecker, 1873)

= Chromacris psittacus =

Species of grasshopper

Chromacris psittacus is a species of grasshopper from the genus Chromacris. Nymphs are red and black in coloration, and often remain in groups, both traits that increase their aposematic signaling to predators. Adults have orange hind wings that similarly function to surprise predators.
