= Charles-Théophile Gaudin =

Swiss paleontologist

Charles-Théophile Gaudin (4 August 1822, Petit-Château, near Lausanne – 12 January 1866, Lausanne) was a Swiss paleontologist known for his research in the field of paleobotany.

He studied theology in Lausanne, afterwards spending several years in England as tutor to the family of Lord Ashley (1845–51). He then returned to Switzerland, where he concentrated on paleontological studies. In 1854 he began work as a tutor to Gabriel de Rumine, the son of Catherine de Rumine, with whom he founded the Musée industriel de Lausanne in 1862.

He spent several winters with his pupil in Italy, from where he conducted much of his significant scientific research. He was a member of the Société Helvetique de Sciences Naturelles and the Société Vaudoise de Sciences Naturelles.

== Selected works ==
with François Jules Pictet de la Rive and Philippe de La Harpe, he collaborated on Mémoire sur les animaux vertébrés trouvés dans le terrain sidérolitique du canton de Vaud et appartenant à la faune éocène. Other noteworthy written efforts by Gaudin are:

- Flore fossile des environs de Lausanne, 1856 – Fossil flora in the vicinity of Lausanne.
- Contributions à la flore fossile italienne (1858–64), with Carlo Strozzi – Contributions to Italian fossil flora.
- Mémoire sur quelques gisements de feuilles fossiles de la Toscane, 1858, with Carlo Strozzi – Memoir on some deposits of fossil leaves in Tuscany.
- Plan général de la Collection industrielle de Lausanne, 1861, with Gabriel de Rumine.
- Recherches sur le climat et la végétation du pays tertiaire, 1861, with Oswald Heer – Research on the climate and vegetation of the Tertiary Age.
