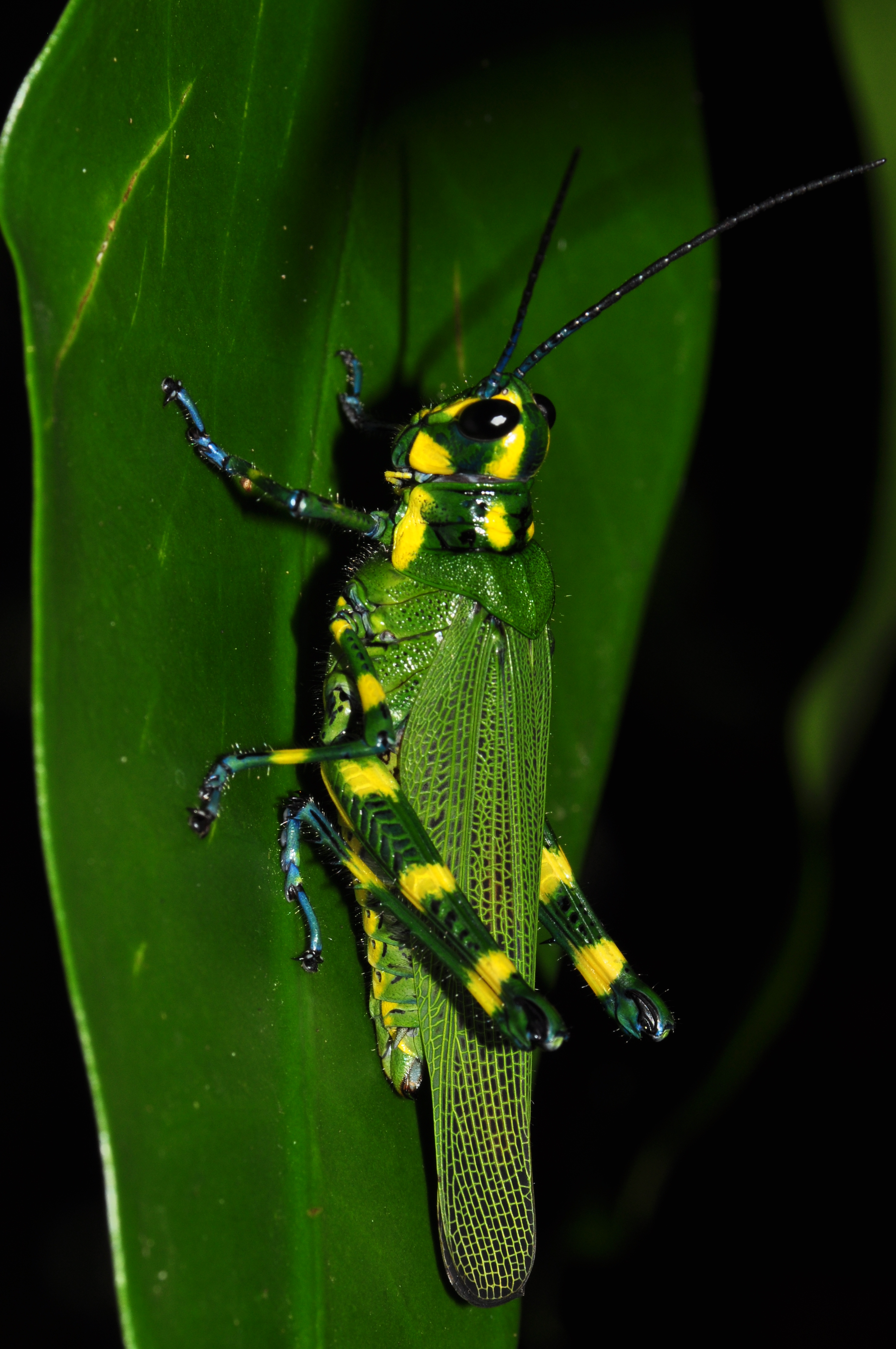
- Chromacris psittacus

Scientific classification
- Domain: Eukaryota
- Kingdom: Animalia
- Phylum: Arthropoda
- Class: Insecta
- Order: Orthoptera
- Suborder: Caelifera
- Family: Romaleidae
- Subfamily: Romaleinae
- Tribe: Romaleini
- Genus: Chromacris; Walker, 1870

= Chromacris =

Genus of grasshoppers

Chromacris is a genus of lubber grasshoppers in the family Romaleidae. The nine described species in Chromacris are found in Mexico, Central America, or South America. They often have bright aposematic colors and they are presumed to be toxic.

The genus was first described in 1870 by Francis Walker.

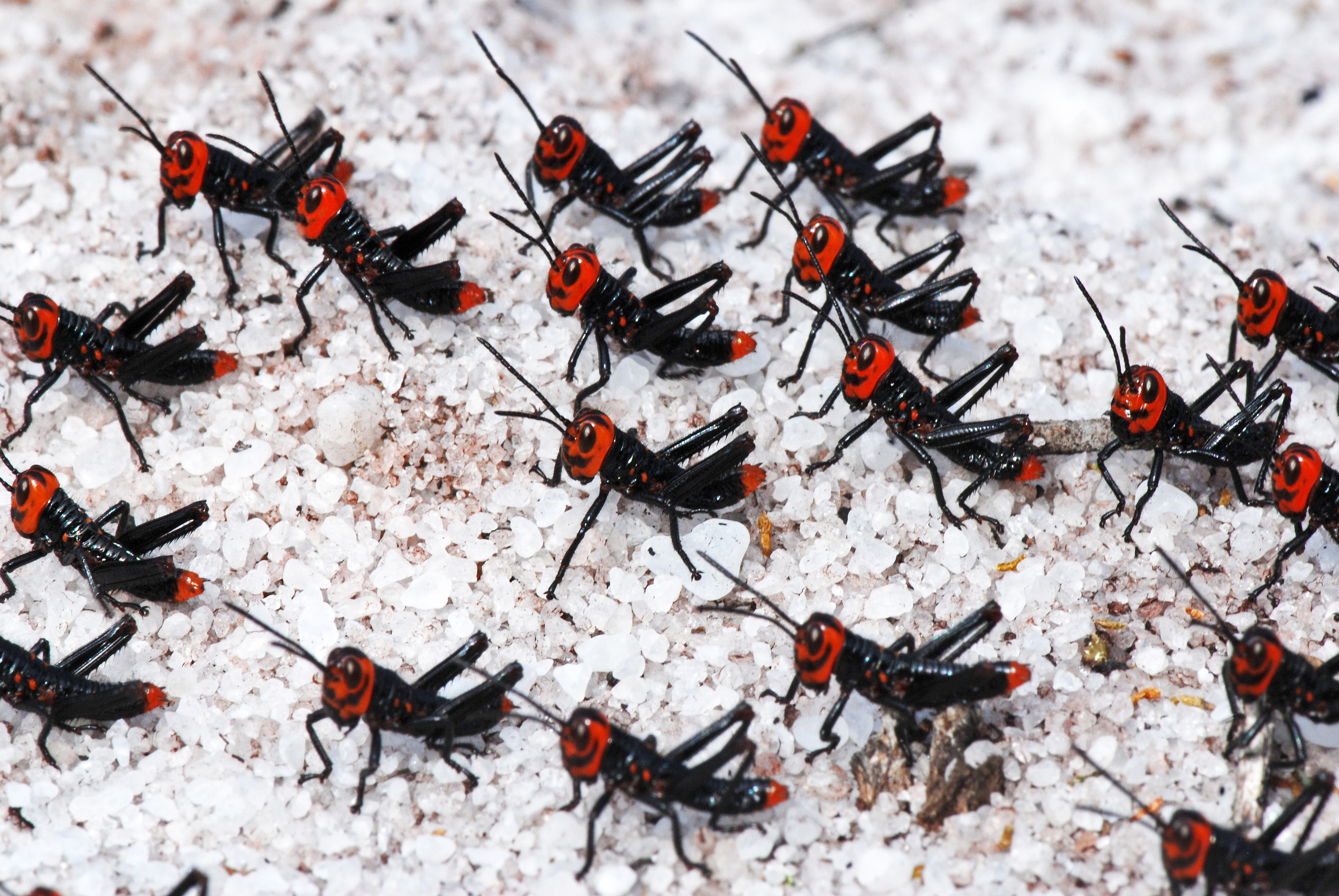
Nymphs of Chromacris speciosa are highly social.

== Species ==
These nine species belong to the genus Chromacris:

- Chromacris colorata (Serville, 1838)
- Chromacris icterus (Pictet & Saussure, 1887)
- Chromacris miles (Drury, 1770)
- Chromacris minuta Roberts & Carbonell, 1982
- Chromacris nuptialis (Gerstaecker, 1873)
- Chromacris peruviana (Pictet & Saussure, 1887)
- Chromacris psittacus (Gerstaecker, 1873)
- Chromacris speciosa (Thunberg, 1824)
- Chromacris trogon (Gerstaecker, 1873)
