= Jacquard =

Jacquard may refer to:

== People ==
- Albert Jacquard (1925–2013), French geneticist and essayist
- Joseph Marie Jacquard (1752–1834), French weaver and inventor of the Jacquard loom
- Robert Jacquard (born 1958), American politician

== Other uses ==
- A M Jacquard Systems, former American manufacturer of small office computer systems
- Project Jacquard, a series of smart textile technologies by Google Advanced Technology and Projects

== See also ==
- Jacquard machine, a power loom attachment that allows the manufacture of intricate patterns
- Jaccard (disambiguation)
