= Philippe de La Harpe =

Swiss physician (1830–1882)

Philippe de La Harpe (1 April 1830, Paudex – 25 February 1882, Lausanne) was a Swiss medical doctor known for research in the fields of geology and paleontology.

He studied medicine in Bonn, Berlin, Prague, Vienna and Lyon, then received his doctor-surgeon licence from the University of Bern in 1854. He spent the winter of 1855/56 in England, where he made the acquaintance of several geologists, then settled as a doctor in Lausanne during the spring of 1856. In Lausanne, he worked as a physician for the remainder of his life, being very active in medical research and a member of various professional groups.

For several years, he was curator of the canton's geological and mineralogical collections (1858-1863). With Charles-Théophile Gaudin (1822–1866) and Gabriel de Rumine (1841–1871), he made significant paleontological findings in the Canton of Vaud. During the last decade of his life, he devoted his energies to the study of nummulites, of which he became an international authority.

== Selected works ==
He made contributions to François Jules Pictet's Matériaux pour la paléontologie suisse, ou recueil de monographies sur les fossiles du Jura et des Alpes (1855-1857). The following are some of his noteworthy written efforts:

- Notice sur la faune du terrain sidérolithique dans la canton de Vaud, 1870 – On the fauna of the siderolithic terrain in the canton of Vaud.
- Note sur les Nummulites des Alpes occidentales, 1877 – On nummulites of the western Alps.
- Note sur la Géologie des environs de Louèche-les-Bains, 1877 – On the geology in the vicinity of Louèche-les-Bains.
- Nummulites des Alpes françaises – Nummulites of the French Alps.
- Étude des Nummulites de la Suisse et revision des espèces éocènes des genres Nummulites et Assilina , 1880 – Study of nummulites of Switzerland and a revision of Eocene species of the genera Nummulites and Assilina.
- Esquisse géologique de la chaîne du Meuvran – Geological sketch of the Muverans.
