= USS Jaccard =

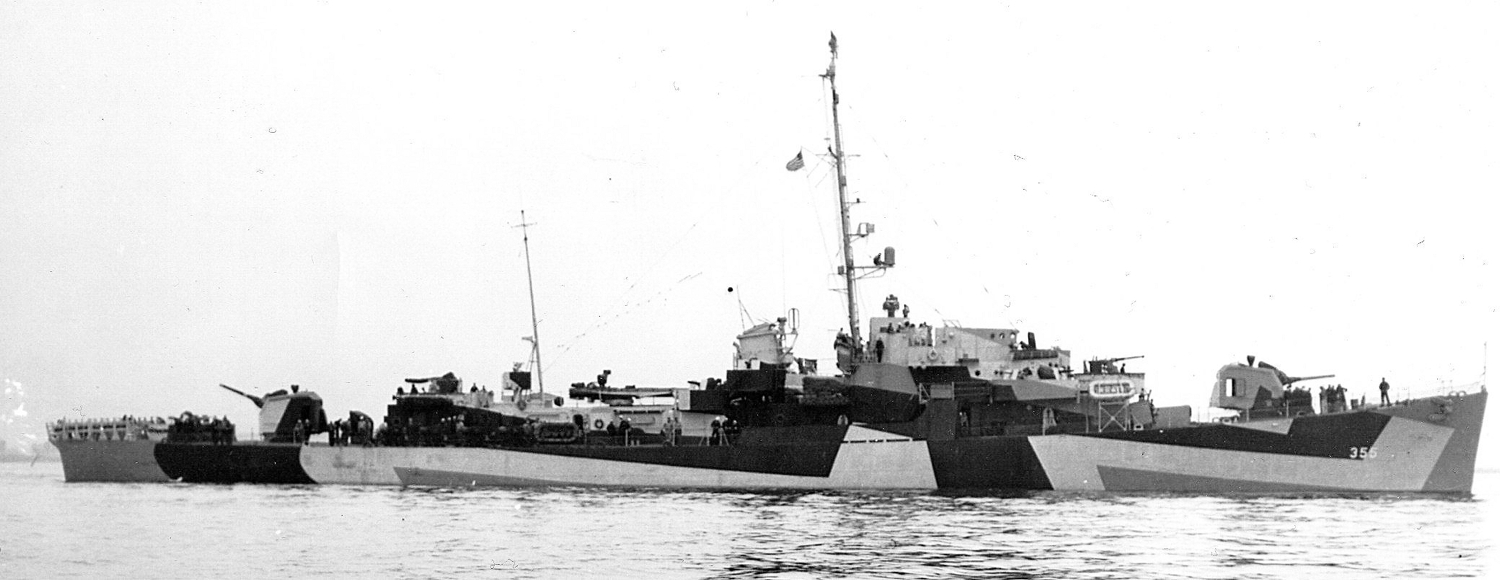
- In Boston, September 1944

History

United States
- Name: Jaccard
- Namesake: Richard Alonzo Jaccard
- Builder: Consolidated Steel Corporation, Orange, Texas
- Laid down: 25 January 1944
- Launched: 18 March 1944
- Commissioned: 26 July 1944
- Decommissioned: 30 September 1946
- Stricken: 1 November 1967
- Honours and awards: 1 battle star for World War II
- Fate: Expended as a target 4 October 1968

General characteristics
- Class & type: John C. Butler-class destroyer escort
- Displacement: 1,350 long tons (1,372 t)
- Length: 306 ft (93 m)
- Beam: 36 ft 8 in (11.18 m)
- Draft: 9 ft 5 in (2.87 m)
- Propulsion: 2 boilers, 2 geared turbine engines, 12,000 shp (8,900 kW); 2 propellers
- Speed: 24 knots (44 km/h; 28 mph)
- Range: 6,000 nmi (11,000 km; 6,900 mi) at 12 kn (22 km/h; 14 mph)
- Complement: 14 officers, 201 enlisted
- Armament: 2 × single 5 in (127 mm) guns; 2 × twin 40 mm (1.6 in) AA guns; 10 × single 20 mm (0.79 in) AA guns; 1 × triple 21 in (533 mm) torpedo tubes; 8 × depth charge throwers; 1 × Hedgehog ASW mortar; 2 × depth charge racks

USS Jaccard (DE-355) was a John C. Butler-class destroyer escort acquired by the U.S. Navy during World War II. The primary purpose of the destroyer escort was to escort and protect ships in convoy, in addition to other tasks as assigned, such as patrol or radar picket. Post-war, she returned home with one battle star to her credit.

== Namesake ==
Richard Alonzo Jaccard was born on 1 July 1918 in Troy, Missouri. He enlisted in the U.S. Naval Reserve on 29 October 1940. He later underwent flight training and upon graduation was commissioned Ensign on 27 September 1941. Reporting to the carrier USS Enterprise in April 1942, Ensign Jaccard later took part in the Battle of Midway. Flying as a wingman to Lieutenant Commander C. Wade McClusky during his dive attack he apparently mistook his undercarriage lever for the wing-brake lever and slowed his plane by lowering his wheels instead of his brake flaps. While he missed his target on that dive, he is credited with a hit on the Imperial Japanese Navy carrier Hiryū (later the same day) and on cruiser Mogami (the next day).

Jaccard flew with Bombing Squadron 6 in support of the landings at Guadalcanal as well as the Battle of the Eastern Solomons in which Enterprise was severely damaged. Bombing 6 was ordered to Efate where a four-plane division including Jaccard was detached and sent to the USS Wasp. Jaccard was killed when Wasp was torpedoed and sunk on 15 September 1942.

== Construction and commissioning ==
Jaccard was launched by Consolidated Steel Corp., Ltd. at Orange, Texas on 18 March 1944, sponsored by Mrs. C. R. Jaccard, mother of Ensign Jaccard. The vessel was commissioned on 26 July 1944.

== Operational history ==
=== World War II Atlantic Ocean operations ===
Following shakedown training out of Bermuda, the new destroyer escort sailed to Boston, Massachusetts, for the installation of new electronic equipment. Jaccard departed on 29 September for Norfolk, Virginia, to join her escort division and after a battle problem off the Virginia Capes escorted a convoy back into Hampton Roads.

=== Transfer to the Pacific Ocean ===
Jaccard then sailed 21 October, transited the Panama Canal, and touched at many of the Navy's south Pacific bases before arriving Hollandia 28 November 1944. After several days of antisubmarine training, she steamed to Leyte, arriving 21 December, and there underwent her first air attack. In the months that followed the destroyer escort operated as a convoy escort from Hollandia, Manus, and the Palaus to Leyte as Allied forces pressed forward in the liberation of the Philippines. Jaccard remained on this duty, escorting a total of eleven convoys of vitally needed supplies, until joining a hunter-killer group 18 March 1945, west of the Philippines. During the next two months she also escorted American submarines to and from Subic Bay.

In May Jaccard returned to escort duty out of Leyte Gulf, but steamed back to the waters off Manila 22 June to patrol and escort submarines. She remained on this duty until after the end of organized fighting, and then began escort duty between Manila and Okinawa 30 August 1945.

=== Post-war operations and fate ===
Early in 1946 the ship began operating as escort and mail ship between the Philippines and ports in China and Korea in support of American troops remaining in these countries to preserve stability. She sailed on 26 April 1946 for the United States, and arrived on 17 May.

After a period of training operations off the U.S. West Coast, Jaccard decommissioned at Puget Sound Navy Yard 30 September 1946, and joined the Pacific Reserve Fleet, Bremerton, Washington. Jaccard was struck from the Naval Vessel Register on 1 November 1967 and later sunk as a target by United States Navy units on 4 October 1968.

== Awards ==
Jaccard received one battle star for World War II service.
