= François Jules Pictet de la Rive =

Swiss zoologist

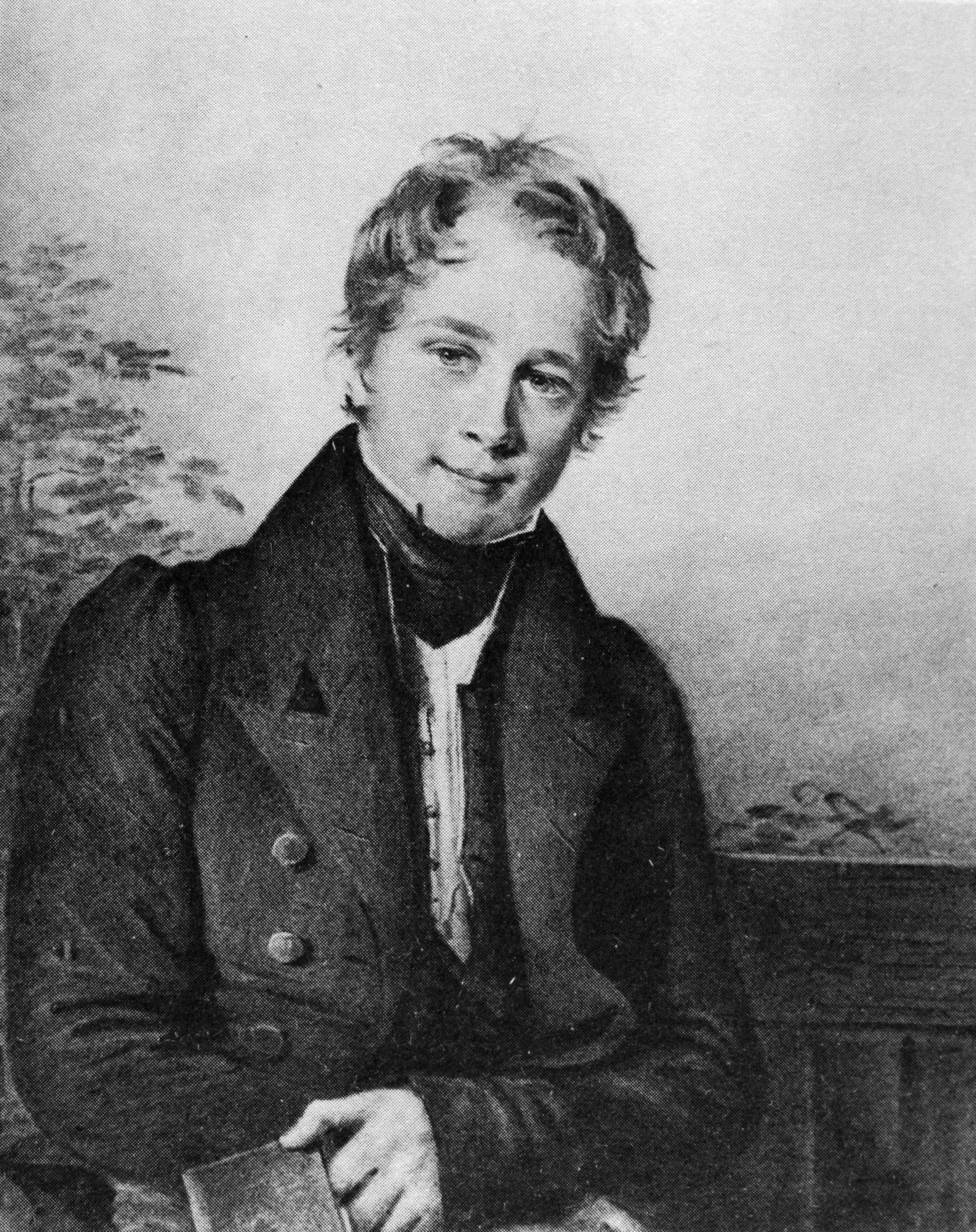
François-Jules Pictet de la Rive, (March 1830)

François-Jules Pictet de la Rive (27 September 1809 – 15 March 1872) was a Swiss zoologist and palaeontologist.

== Biography ==
He was born in Geneva. He graduated B. Sc. at Geneva in 1829, and pursued his studies for a short time at Paris, where under the influence of Georges Cuvier, de Blainville and others, he worked at natural history and comparative anatomy. On his return to Geneva in 1830 he assisted A. P. de Candolle by giving demonstrations in comparative anatomy. Five years later, when de Candolle retired, Pictet was appointed professor of zoology and comparative anatomy.

In 1846 his duties were restricted to certain branches of zoology, including geology and palaeontology, and these he continued to teach until 1859, when he retired to devote his energies to the museum of natural history and to special palaeontological work. He was rector of the Academy from 1847 to 1850, and again from 1866 to 1868. He was for many years a member of the "Grand Conseil", the parliament of the Canton of Geneva, serving as its president in 1863 and 1864.

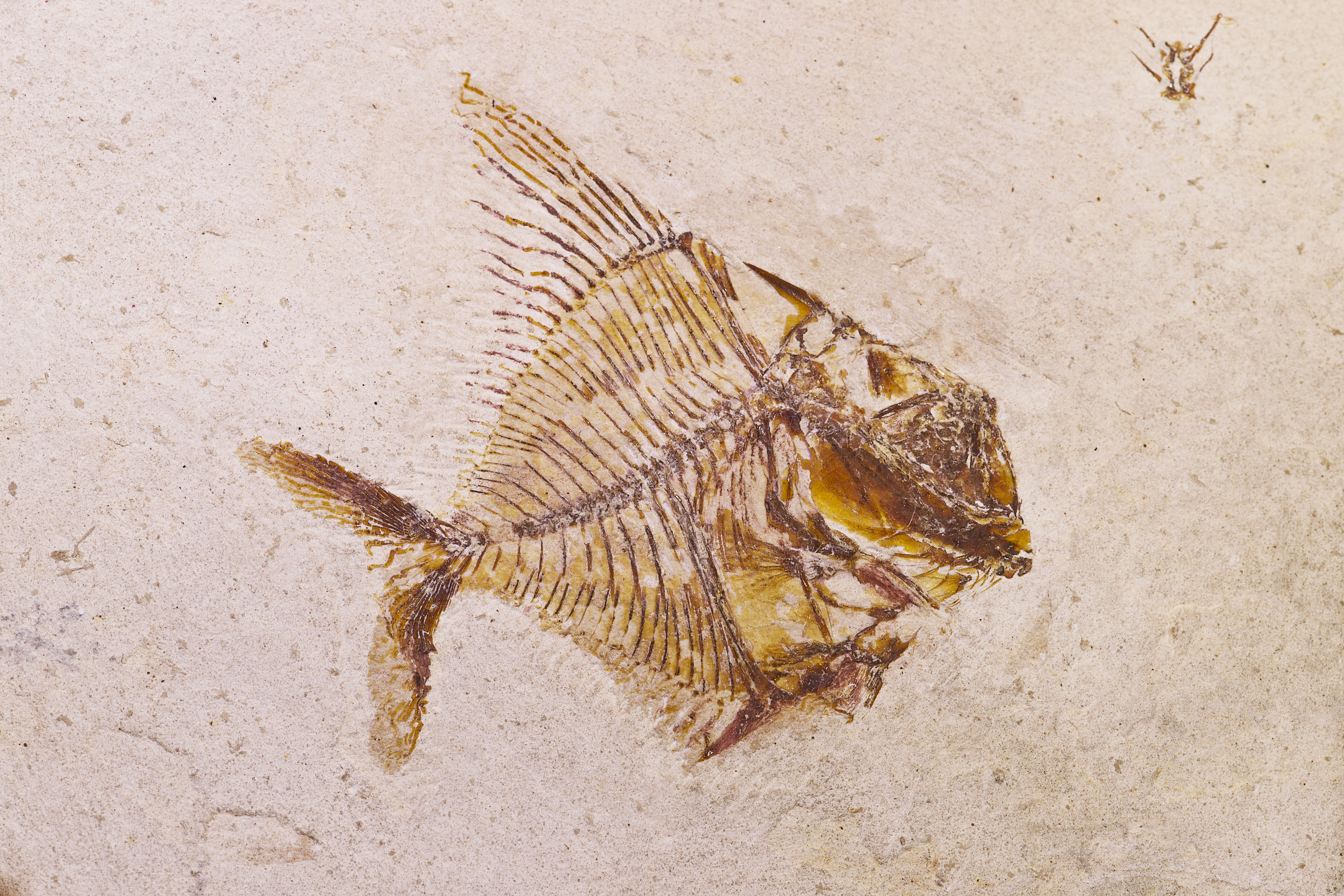
Aipichthys minor (Pictet 1850)

His earlier published work related chiefly to entomology, and included Recherches pour servir à l'histoire et à l'anatomie des Phryganides (1834) and two parts of Histoire naturelle, générale et particulière, des insectes névroptères (1842–1845).

He directed his attention to the fossils of his native country, more especially to those of the Cretaceous and Jurassic strata, and in 1854 he commenced the publication of his great work, Matériaux pour la paléontologie suisse, ou Recueil de monographies sur les fossiles du Jura et des Alpes..., a series of quarto memoirs, of which six were published (1854–1873). In this work Pictet was aided by Eugène Renevier, Gustave Campiche, Alois Humbert, Charles Louis Perceval de Loriol, Auguste Jaccard and Philippe de La Harpe. Pictet also brought out Mélanges paléontologiques (1863–1868). He died in Geneva in 1872.

A species of Malagasy snake, Elapotinus picteti, is named in his honor.

== Successive creation ==
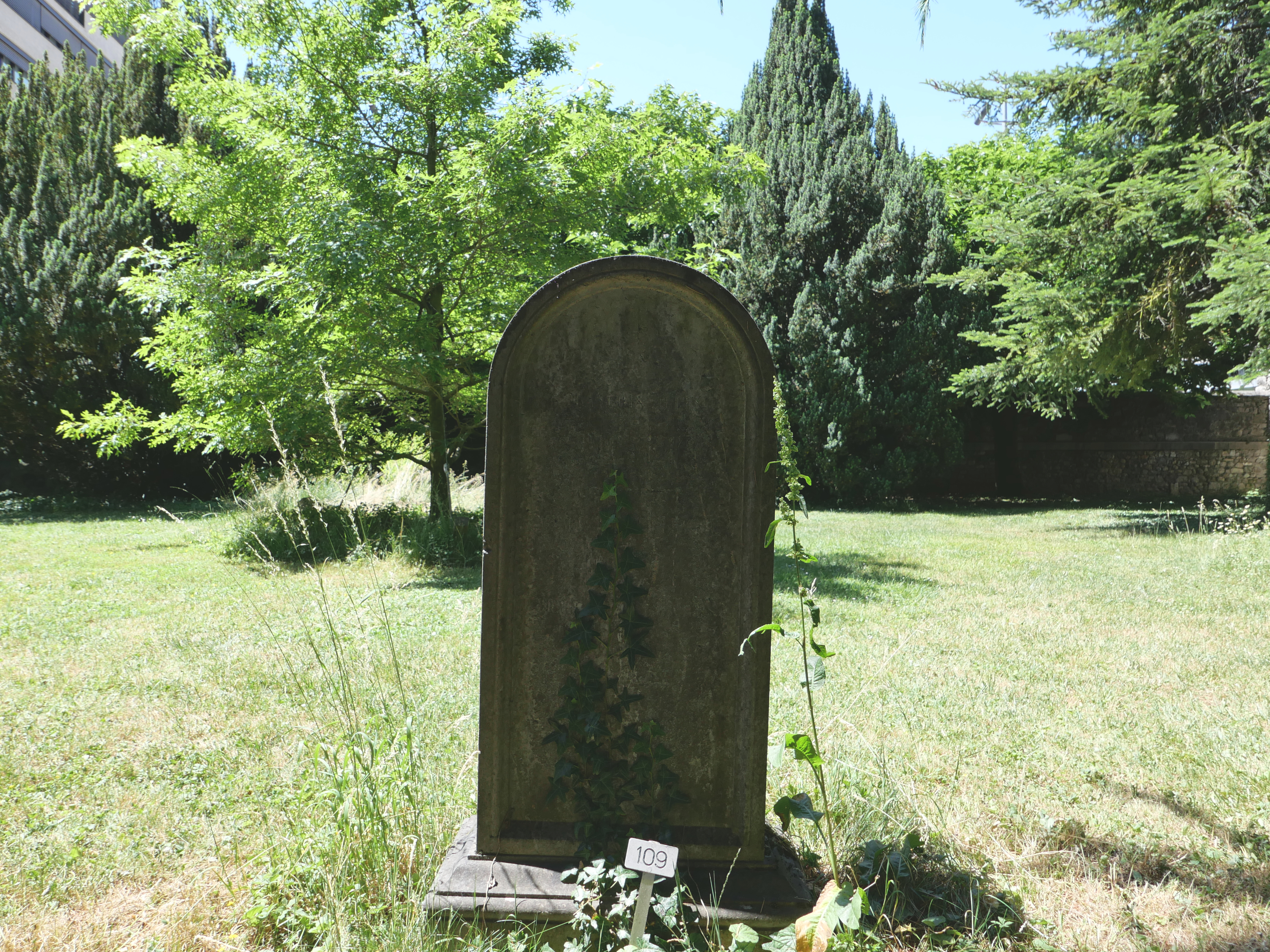
Pictet's grave at the Cimetière des Rois, which is considered the Pantheon of Geneva

He was the author of Traité élémentaire de paléontologie (4 vols. 1844-1846). In the first edition Pictet, while adopting the hypothesis of successive creations of species, admitted that some may have originated through the modification of pre-existing forms. In his second edition (1853–1857) he enters further into the probable transformation of some species, and discusses the independence of certain faunas, which did not appear to have originated from the types which locally preceded them. Alfred Russel Wallace made notes on Pictet's Paleontology and these have been suggested as giving a structure for his 'Sarawak Law' paper of 1855 which contains the assertion that "Every species has come into existence coincident both in space and time with a pre-existing closely allied species": this, omitting the word 'generally' is point 2 of Wallace's precis.

Pictet was an advocate of progressive creationism, the belief that species were created in successive stages. He acknowledged from the fossil record that some species had evolved from earlier ancestors but denied that entire groups of species had evolved through gradual transformation. He reviewed Charles Darwin's On the Origin of Species in a lengthy review. Darwin noted that "Of all the opposed reviews I think this the only quite fair one, & I never expected to see one." Darwin predicted that Pictet would eventually support his theory but this was not the case. He never abandoned his view of successive species creation.

He was elected to the American Philosophical Society in 1864.
