= Auguste Jaccard =

Swiss geologist and paleontologist

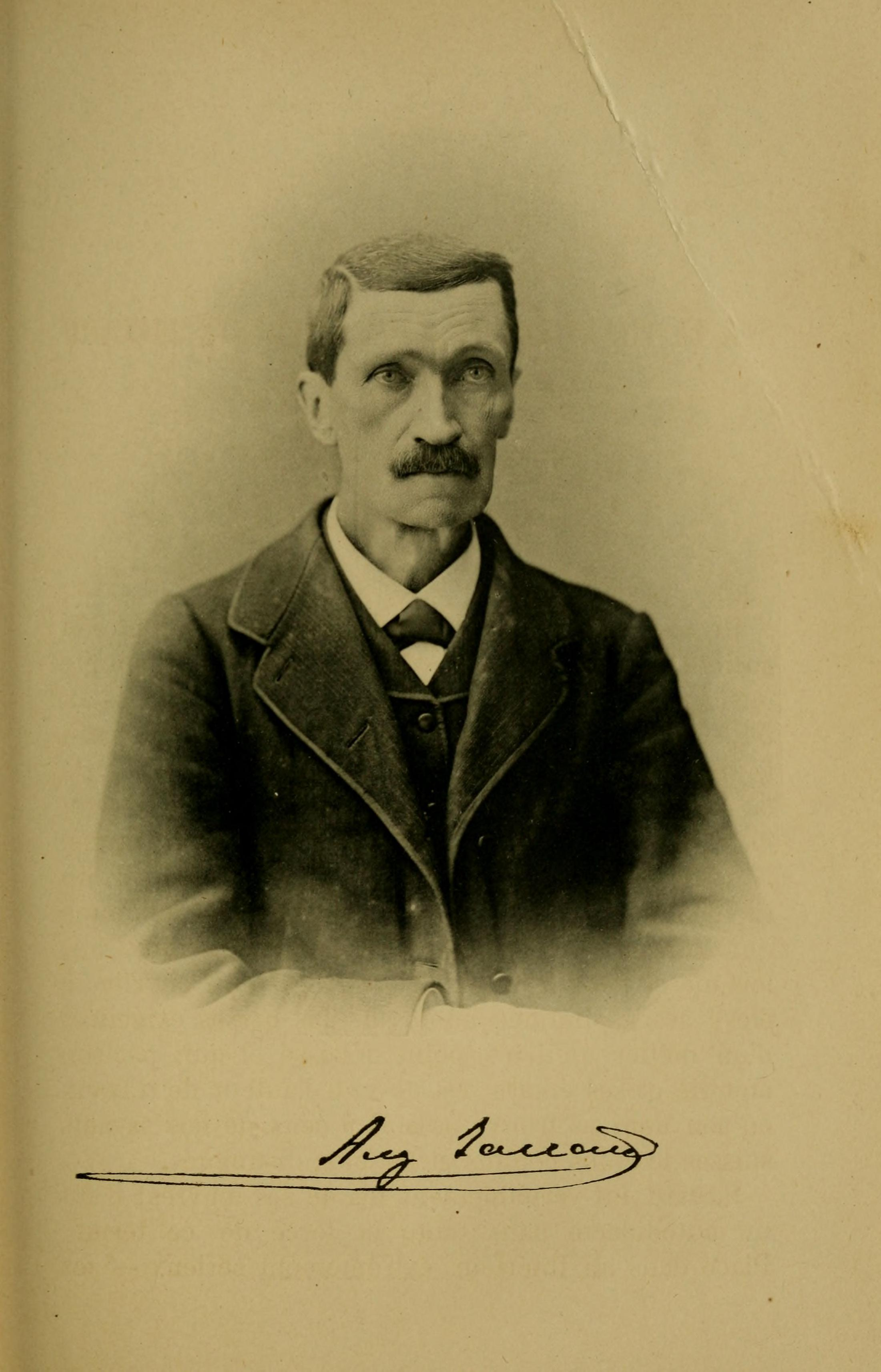
Auguste Jaccard

Auguste Jaccard (6 July 1833, in Culliairy near Sainte-Croix – 5 January 1895, in Le Locle) was a Swiss geologist and paleontologist. His scientific research, for the most part, was associated with the Jura Mountains.

In around 1845, he moved with his father to Le Locle, where the elder Jaccard opened a guilloché workshop that was later managed by his son. As a geologist, Auguste Jaccard was self-taught, having Oswald Heer and Pierre Jean Édouard Desor as important influences to his career. In 1856 he released his first publication, a treatise on fossils found in the basin of Le Locle.

From 1861 he was a member of the geological survey group of the Société helvétique des sciences naturelles (Swiss Society of Natural Sciences), tasked with mapping the western part of the Jura Mountains. In 1868 he became a substitute teacher at the Neuchâtel Academy, where he later served as a professor (1873–95). He is credited with creating a geological map that extended to the western part of Switzerland (Neuchâtel, Jura and Vaud). He also conducted applied research in the field of hydrology and of petroleum and cement. In 1883 he was awarded with an honorary doctorate from the University of Zurich.

== Selected works ==
- Supplément ä la Description géologique du Jura vaudois et neuchâtelois, 1870 – Supplement to the geological description of Jura and Neuchâtel,
- Coup d'oeil sur les origines et le développement de la paléontologie en Suisse, 1887 – The origins and development of paleontology in Switzerland.
- Le pétrole, l'asphalte et le bitume au point de vue géologique, 1895 – Petroleum, asphalt and bitumen from a geological viewpoint.
