= Kalakocetus =

Kalakocetus Temporal range: Eocene (Ypresian), 50.1–48 Ma

Scientific classification
- Kingdom: Animalia
- Phylum: Chordata
- Class: Mammalia
- Order: Artiodactyla
- Infraorder: Cetacea
- Family: †Kalakocetidae; Waqas et al., 2026
- Genus: †Kalakocetus; Waqas et al., 2026

Type species
- †Kalakocetus aurorae Waqas et al., 2026
- Map showing the location of the type locality of Kalakocetus in Jammu & Kashmir India

Extinct genus of cetacean

Kalakocetus (lit. 'Kalakot's whale') is an extinct genus of basal cetacean that lived during Eocene epoch in Subathu Formation of Kalakote town in Jammu and Kashmir, India. The genus is monotypic, with the only known species being Kalakocetus aurorae. Its unique dental morphology is considered a bridge between the crushing molars of raoellids, the closest relatives of cetaceans and the shearing molars of pakicetids, a family of some of the earliest cetaceans.

== Discovery and naming ==
The holotype of Kalakocetus, GU/RJ/07, was collected by Mohd Waqas in the Subathu Formation outcrops of Kalakote, in his homeland of Rajouri district of Jammu and Kashmir. The Subathu formation of Kalakocetus locality was dated by Waqas and colleagues to be 50 to 48 million years old. The specimen was later moved to an institute in Montpellier, France where it was CT scanned and a cast replica was also made. After continuous research, it was sent back to the Garhwal University, where it was properly catalogued. The holotype of Kalakocetus consists of a fragmentary left mandible, which came from a fully–grown individual.

Later in 2026, Waqas and colleagues described Kalakocetus aurorae as a new genus and species of basal cetacean, based on the left mandible GU/RJ/07, and designated it as the holotype specimen. The generic name, Kalakocetus, combines the word Kalako, after the Kalakote town, and the word cetus, which is derived from the Latin word cetus and the Greek word kētos meaning 'whale', 'sea monster' or 'large sea creature'. The specific name, aurorae, is the Latin word for 'of the sunrise', as a reference to it giving the rise to the cetacean.

== Description ==
=== Dentition ===
Kalakocetus differs from other early cetaceans in the presence of quadricuspids and entoconids on the first molar, while there is a presence of tricuspid on the third molar. These molars also have a lower trigonid and a crushing basin on the lingual side of the hypoconid, which is also present, delimited by a marked endohypocristid. The diagnostic traits of the holotype include a short symphysis and a small mandibular canal. A small diastema is present between several teeth, such as between the canine and first premolar, the first premolar and second premolar, and finally the second and third premolar. The fourth premolar lacks a paraconid. The lower first molars have four cusps (the protoconid, metaconid, hypoconid, and entoconid), with the trigonid much higher than the talonid, and a widely open talonid basin, with hypoconid and entoconid endocristids forming a transverse lophid. The third lower molar has a tricuspid with a trigonid much higher than the talonid; the trigonid is composed of a central protoconid and a smaller lingual metaconid separated by a shallow groove; anteroposterior orientation of the precristids of the protoconid and metaconid; the talonid is restricted to a central, massive hypoconid; the presence of a marked endohypocristid and continuous posterolingual cingulid. Presence of wide labial wear shearing facets on the fourth and third premolars.

=== Evolution ===
When the teeth were compared to other cetaceamorphs like raoellids and archaeocetes, Waqas et al. found the molar teeth of Kalakocetus to represent a transitional or mosaic linkage between the more terrestrial raoellidae (with their crushing teeth, that were used by them to chew on vegetation) and more derived archaeocetes (with their sharp shearing teeth, that suggests they were faunivores).

== Classification ==
Waqas et al., (2026) recovered Kalakocetus as the most basal member of Cetacea, being more basal than Nalacetus and Pakicetus in their phylogenetic dataset. Their results are shown below:

- - Cetaceamorpha
    - - Raoellidae
        - Khirtharia
        - - Indohyus
          - - Metkatius
            - Rajouria
      - Cetacea
        - Kalakocetus
        - - Nalacetus
          - - Pakicetus
            - - Ambulocetus
              - - Togocetus
                - Himalayacetus

== Paleoecology ==
Fossils attributed to Kalakocetus are known from Subathu Formation, that dates back to Eocene epoch, the formation also has a great faunal diversity of land vertebrate, beside Kalakocetus, that were recorded since 1970s, which includes all raoellids (Khirtharia, Indohyus, Kunmunella, Rajouria, and Metkatius), other early cetaceans like Himalayacetus and Ichthyolestes, rodents like Birbalomys, Basalomys, Chapattimys, Saykanomys and Subathumys, diacodexeid like Gujaratia, anthracobunids like Ishatherium and Anthracobune, tapiromorphs like Sastrilophus and Kalakotia, hyaenodont like Paratritemnodon, brontotheriid like Mulkrajanops, paraceratheriid like Forstercooperia, anguid like Rajaurisaurus, indeterminate crocodylomorphs like sebecosuchian and pristichampsine like forms, and indeterminate testudines and adapiformes.
