= Haqueina =

Haqueina Temporal range: Eocene (Lutetian), 48.7–42.2 Ma

Scientific classification
- Kingdom: Animalia
- Phylum: Chordata
- Class: Mammalia
- Order: Artiodactyla
- Family: †Dichobunidae
- Genus: †Haqueina; Dehm and Oettingen-Spielberg, 1958

Type species
- †Haqueina haquei Dehm and Oettingen-Spielberg, 1958

Species
- †H. haquei Dehm and Oettingen-Spielberg, 1958; †H. haichinensis Vislobokova, 2004

Genus of extinct artiodactyl from the middle eocene

Haqueina is a medium-sized extinct artiodactyl of uncertain phylogenetic position within Dichobunidae. Remains of Haqueina have been found from Mongolia and northern India. It was discovered by german paleontologists in India in 1958. The type species, H. haquei, is known only from teeth and small mandibular fragments, while H. haichinensis is known from a near-complete left mandible and a fragmentary maxilla. Historically, it was initially assigned to Dichobunidae, and then later commonly grouped within Raoellidae, although it was moved out of Raoellidae and back to Dichobunidae in 2007. The classification of Haqueina remains uncertain because of the lack of remains. Haqueina was a small, basal, artiodactyl that likely was primarily herbivorous and similar to a small deer.

== Etymology ==
The genus Haqueina and species H. haquei are both named after Mohsenul Haque, who was the superintendent geologist of the geological survey of Pakistan at the time of the discovery of Haqueina. H. haichinensis is named after the Khaichin formation, which is the Mongolian formation where the remains were found.

== Classification ==
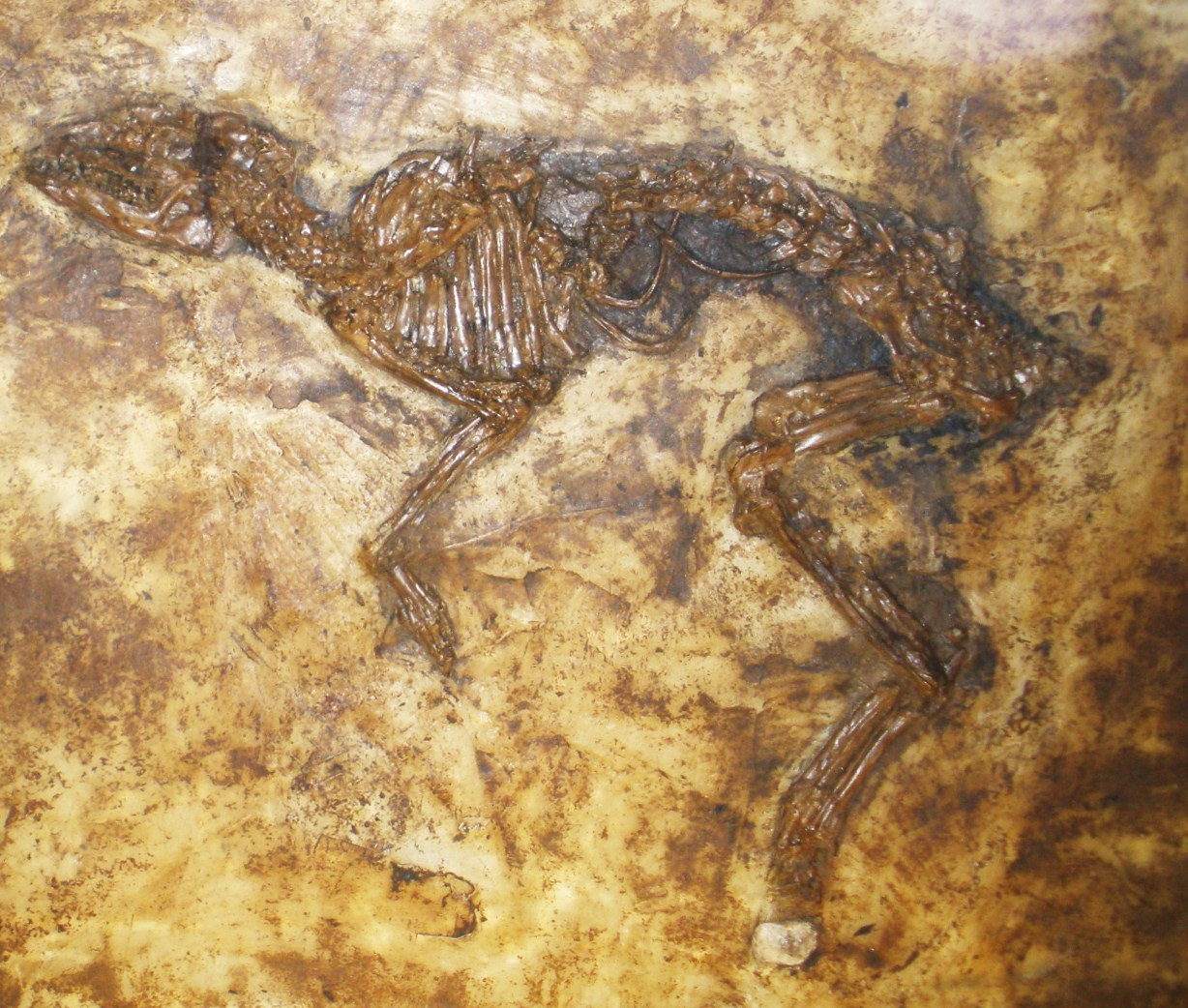
Fossil of Messelobunodon, a fellow dichobunid

Haqueina was discovered by Richard Dehm and Therese Oettingen-Spielberg in 1958. The holotype is two molars (the second and third molar) from the Ganda Kas formation of Pakistan. Dehm and Oettingen-Spielberg placed Haqueina within Dichobunidae, noting its resemblance to choeropotamid Haplobunodon. In 1977, Coombs and Coombs noted that Haqueina resembled both Helohyids and Anthacotheriids, and therefore decided that Haqueina was of uncertain position within Artiodactyla. In 1980, Robert M. West placed Haqueina within Anthracotheriidae. However, one year later Sahni et al. stated that this placement was uncertain, and he placed Haqueina within the newly-formed family Raoellidae, which at the time was a collection of morphologically similar small artiodactyls with an unstable classification. In 1995, Holroyd and Ciochon stated that Haqueina was closely related to Helohyidae. In 1996, Erfert and Sudre placed Haqueina within Diacodexidae, although their suggestion was largely ignored. Next year, Ducrocq and colleagues called Haqueina a "possible raoellid", indicating a degree of uncertainty towards the phylogenetic placement of the taxon. Later in 1997, McKenna and Bell reaffirmed the placement of Haqueina within Raoellidae. In 2001, Haqueina was again placed firmly within Raoellidae by Thewissen, Williams, and Hussain. In 2004, the new species H. haichinensis was named based of Haqueina material from Mongolia. They again placed Haqueina within Raoellidae, although noted that it held more basal characteristics than most other raoellids. In 2007, after it was found that Raoellidae were the sister group to Cetacea, the phylogenetic relationships within Raoellidae were reexamined. The same year, Theodor, Erfurt and Métais moved Haqueina from Raoellidae to Dichobunidae. In 2011, Orliac and Ducrocq conducted a phylogenetic analysis of Raoellidae, again determining Haqueina was not a member of Raoellidae. They found that it was more similar to Gobiohyus, which was supported by morphological analysis. In 2018, Ducrocq suggested in passing that Haqueina could be a member of Helohyidae. In 2021, another phylogenetic study of Raoellidae returned Haqueina as closely related to Gobiohyus, although they mentioend that H. haquei looked more similar to raoellids than H. haichinensis, the latter of which was the species they used to test Haqueina's phylogenetic relationship. In 2022, Haqueina was described as an asian dichobunid of uncertain taxonomic status. The next year, Haqueina was referred to as a dichobunid in the description of Erlianhyus, with the study again recovering Haqueina as closely related to Gobiohyus. Since then, Haqueina has been almost entirely left out of discussions on Raoellidae.

== Description ==
=== Haqueina haquei ===
The teeth of H. haquei are generally selenodont and bunodont. The second and third molars are roughly the same size, with the third being slightly larger. In the second molar, the protoconid and metaconid are situated close to each other in the anterior section of the tooth. These two cusps form a groove that encloses a basin. Cingulum is present on the anterior side of the tooth. The entoconid is compressed to the edge of the tooth on the lingual side. The third molar of H. haquei has a low hypolophid and large hypoconulid. The hypoconulid of the third molar is part of a crest that connects to the hypoconid, similar to Haplobunodon. The hypolophid of the third molar has a small cusp positioned closer to the hypoconid than the entoconid. The molar has a horseshoe shaped, upturned, feature located on the lingual side.

=== Haqueina haichinensis ===
==== Dentition ====
The premolars are significantly longer than the molars. The first premolar is small, caniniform, and single-rooted. The second premolar is double rooted and larger and much longer that the first premolar. It is triangular laterally. A small gap is present between the second and third premolars. The crowns on the second, third, and fourth premolars are high and triangular from a lateral view, with an especially enlarged paracone. Every premolar has lingual and labial cingula. The second premolar is narrow and its lingual side slopes inwards. The third premolar has a small protocone and large parastyle. The anterior parts of the protocone fused with lingual cingulum, while the posterior section unsurprisingly merges with posterior cingulum. The crown of the fourth molar is symmetrical. The protocone is large and central, holding a small paraconule. The parastyle is large.

The upper molars have four large cusps: the paracone, metacone, protocone, and metaconule. Instead of a large hypocone, there is an enlarged metaconule. The first molar is much smaller than the second molar, which in turn is slightly smaller than the third molar. The crowns of all molars, especially the third, are expanded transversely and narrow posteriorly. The labial side is longer than the lingual side on the third molar. The parastyle is large, especially in the third molar. The metastyle is small in the third molar, while the mesostyle is small in all molars. The paraconule is closer to the paracone than the protocone in the first molar, while it is equidistant to each in the second and third molars.

==== Mandible ====
The mandible is slightly convex between the second premolar and third molar. The mandible is deepest at the second molar. It slowly tapers from the fourth to first premolar. The anterior mental foramen is below the first premolar and is larger than the posterior mental foramen, which is below the third and fourth premolar.

== Paleoecology ==
=== Haqueina haquei ===
H. haquei lived in the Upper Subathu Formation of northern India, about 50 million years ago, at the same time as the beginning of the formation of the Himalayan mountains. India was an island subcontinent during the temporal range of H. haquei, and the process of collision and subsequent mountain building of the Himalayas had only just begun during Haqueia's emergence. At the time, Kashmir was a wet, tropical flood basin with many shallow marine formations; this is explained by the fact it was an equatorial coastal region during the Early Eocene Climatic Optimum, where temperatures were significantly higher than normal. This led to the global climate being a "greenhouse Earth", meaning that there were no year-round ice caps. There were likely large rainforests and mangrove forests along the coastlines of northern India at the time, coinciding with plankton blooms due to the extreme heat. The climate was very humid.

H. haquei inhabited the Ganda Kas locality in Pakistan. Haqueina coexisted with every species of Raoellidae (Kunmunella, Indohyus, Metkatius, Rajouria, Khirtharia) and many early pakicetids, ambulocetids, and protocetids; pakicetids: (Pakicetus, Ichthyolestes), ambulocetids: (Gandakasia), protocetids: (Protocetus, Indocetus). H. haquei also coexisted with Anthrocobune, Pilgrimella, and Lammidhania, which were small perissodactyls, and Eotitanops, a brontothere.

=== Haqueina haichinensis ===
H. haichinensis lived in the Khaichin formation in Mongolia about 45 million years ago. The ecosystem of H. haichinensis would be fairly wet. The remains of H. haichinensis were found in a lacustrine–alluvial deposit, meaning the rock was made from lake and river deposition.

H. haichinensis shared its ecosystem with two other genera of artiodactyls: Gobiohyus and Chorlakkia. It also coexised with one or two genera of entelodonts: Proentelodon, which was a small artiodactyl that is possibly an entelodont, and the definitive entelodont Brachyhyops, and the possible hyaenodont Propterodon.

== See also ==
- Evolution of cetaceans
- Cetacea
- Pakicetus
- Glossary of mammalian dental topography
