= Mulkrajanops =

Mulkrajanops Temporal range: Middle Eocene
- Sketch of the underside of VPL/K 563, the type specimen of M. moghliensis

Scientific classification
- Kingdom: Animalia
- Phylum: Chordata
- Class: Mammalia
- Order: Perissodactyla
- Family: †Brontotheriidae (?)
- Genus: †Mulkrajanops; Kumar & Sahni, 1985
- Species: †M. moghliensis

Binomial name
- †Mulkrajanops moghliensis Kumar & Sahni, 1985

Extinct genus of mammals

Mulkrajanops is a dubious extinct genus of perissodactyl, possibly a primitive brontothere, known from the Middle Eocene of South Asia. Fossils of the type and only species, M. moghliensis, have been found in both India-administered and Pakistan-administered districts of the disputed Kashmir region.

== Research history ==
Mulkrajanops moghliensis was described in 1985 by Kishor Kumar and Ashok Sahni, based on Middle Eocene partial skull (VPL/K 563) found in the Upper Subathu Group of the India-administered Jammu and Kashmir region. The genus name Mulkrajanops honors the professor Mulk Raj Sahni, and the species name is derived from the locality of the fossils, the village of Moghla in the Rajouri District. VPL/K 563 partially preserves both sides of the upper dentition. Kumar and Sahni identified Mulkrajanops as a primitive brontothere due to morphological similarities to the primitive brontothere Eotitanops, from which they differentiated Mulkrajanops by dental features. Per Kumar and Sahni, the molars of Mulkrajanops are much more elongated than those of Eotitanops. Kumar and Sahni further differentiated Mulkrajanops from E. dayi, an Asian species of Eotitanops since reclassified as a species Palaeosyops, by the protocone and hypocone being further apart than in E. dayi, by the more lingually placed protocone, and by the presence of a metaconule.

In 2011, Peter Missiaen, Gregg F. Gunnell, and Philip D. Gingerich tentatively referred additional fossils to M. moghliensis, from the Pakistan-administered Kotli District. These new fossils consisted of a humerus (GSP-UM 1575) and a calcaneus (GSP-UM 1743), identified as belonging to a primitive brontothere of Middle Eocene age. Identification as M. moghliensis was based solely on it being the only possible brontothere known from the region and timeframe of the fossils.

== Description and classification ==
Mulkrajanops was a fairly large and long-snouted animal. The cheek teeth series (first premolar to third molar) of the type specimen measures 13.5 centimeters long. Mulkrajanops had the dental formula 2.1.4.32.1.4.3.

Kumar and Sahni classified Mulkrajanops as a primitive brontothere, in the subfamily Eotitanopinae due to comparing it to Palaeosyops dayi (then classified as Eotitanops dayi). In 1997, Malcolm McKenna and Susan K. Bell placed Mulkrajanops in the brontothere subfamily Palaeosyopinae alongside Palaeosyops, though they considered Eotitanops to be a synonym of Palaeosyops. In 2008, Matthew C. Mihlbachler considered Mulkrajanops to represent a problematic taxon in need of reanalysis, noting that it was probably valid but that it might not be a brontothere. Mihbachler noted that many features of the dentition of Mulkrajanops appeared to be consistent with brontotheres, but that the type specimen apparently lacks well-developed molar mesostyles, which are otherwise present in brontotheres and in genera believed to be close relatives of brontotheres, such as Lambdotherium and Danjiangia.

== Paleoecology ==
The Upper Subathu Group was deposited under fluvial conditions. In addition to Mulkrajanops, fossils of several other mammals have been recovered, including raoellids (Khirtharia, Kunmunella, and Metkatius), pakicetids (Ichthyolestes), and ctenodactylid rodents.
