= Himalayan foreland basin =

Active collisional foreland basin in South Asia

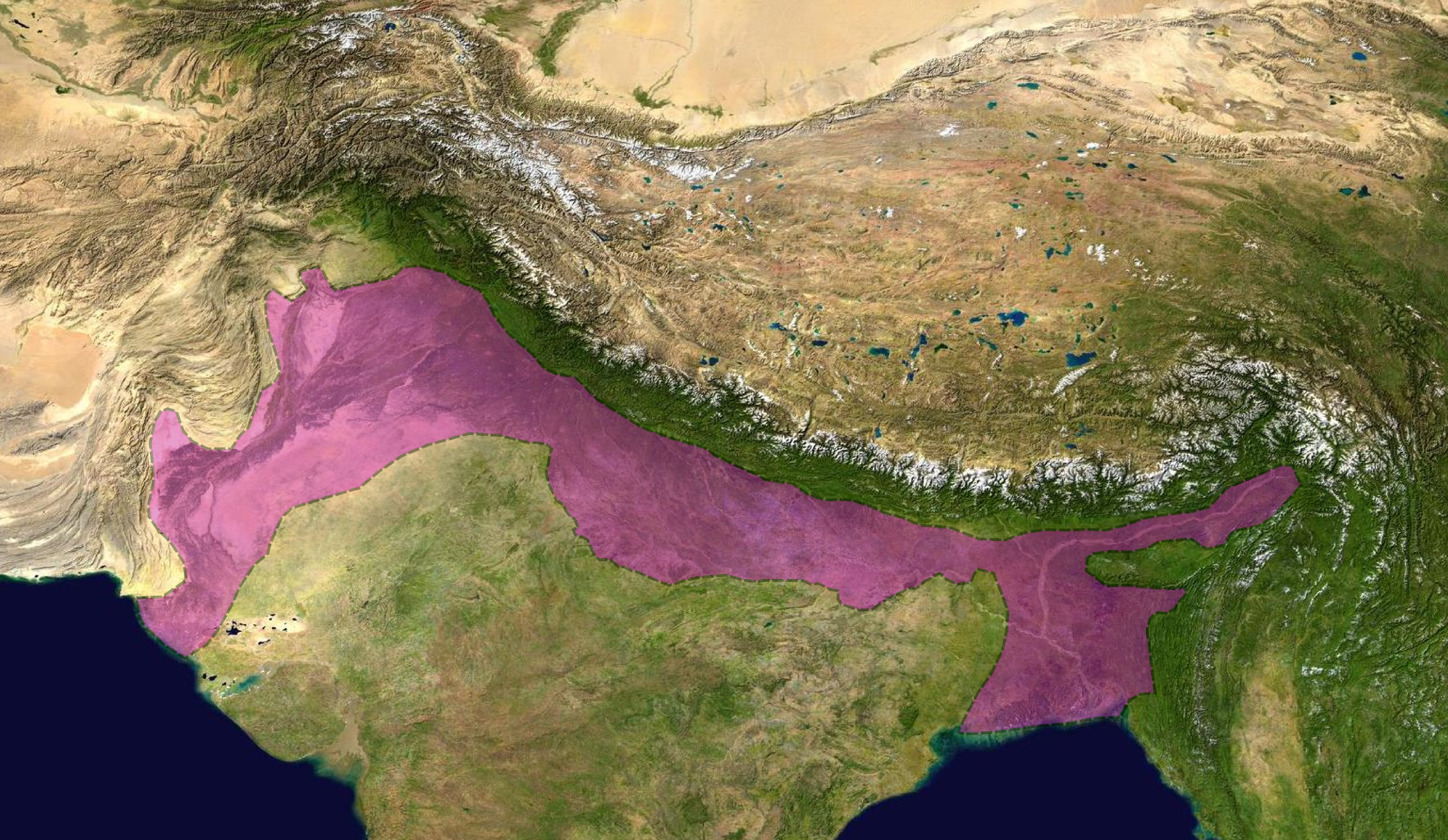
Satellite image of the Himalayas with the Himalayan foreland basin highlighted in purple

The Himalayan foreland basin is an active collisional foreland basin system in the Indian subcontinent. Uplift and loading of the Eurasian Plate on to the Indian Plate resulted in the flexure (bending) of the Indian Plate, and the creation of a depression adjacent to the Himalayan mountain belt. This depression was filled with sediment eroded from the Himalaya, that lithified and produced a sedimentary basin ~3 to >7 km deep. The foreland basin spans approximately 2,000 kilometres (1,200 mi) in length and 450 kilometres (280 mi) in width. From west to east the foreland basin stretches across five modern-day South Asian countries: Pakistan, India, Nepal, Bangladesh, and Bhutan.

The Himalayan foreland basin has been studied within the Himalaya (where the foreland basin succession has been uplifted and exposed in the Sub-Himalaya and Lesser Himalaya), and in the subsurface (where petroleum exploration wells and seismic data are used). The foreland basin fill traces back to the onset development of the foreland basin which started during the Paleogene period around 45 to 50 Ma. Deposition in the foreland basin appears to be diachronous; a lag in time exists between parts of the basin. The western extreme of the basin started developing during the Paleocene around 57-54 Ma, the central portion began developing <2 Ma later, and the basin gets younger as it progresses towards the east. The stratigraphic succession of the basin is important as it preserves the sedimentary record of India-Eurasia collision.

== Geologic setting ==
During the Late Cretaceous and early Cenozoic, the Indian Plate drifted northward a vast distance resulting in the closure of the Neo-Tethys Ocean. Approximately 40 to 50 million years ago remnants of the ocean vanished as India collided with the Eurasian Plate. As the continental plates are relatively low density they cannot be subducted. This results in the Eurasian Plate being thrusted up leading to the rise of the Tibetan Plateau, bounded to the south by the collisional Himalayan mountain range. The Himalayan foreland basin is adjacent to the Himalayan mountain belt; it laps onto the Indian Craton to the south and is bounded by stacked thrust sheets of the Himalayas to the north. The foreland basin, much like the Himalayan mountain range, spans approximately 2,000 kilometres (1,200 mi) west to east across Pakistan, India, Nepal, Bhutan and Bangladesh. The actively subsiding foreland basin lies beneath the Punjab region of Pakistan and the Gangetic plain of India and southernmost Nepal.

== Basin subdivisions ==
The Himalayan foreland basin has been divided on the basis of modern drainage divides, and subsurface topography. Subdivisions based on drainage divides are most commonly used, with the Indus Basin reflecting the drainage area of the Indus River, and the Ganga Basin representing the drainage area of the Ganges River.

The basin overlies a series of Indian Plate depressions and ridges, that have also been used to subdivide the foreland basin. The rock units that make up the Indian Plate vary dramatically along the length of the basin, changing from Proterozoic Mobile Belt rocks, to Archean Craton, and Proterozoic Vindhyan Supergroup sedimentary rocks. These Indian Plate rock units extend under the foreland basin and have been correlated to a series of depressions and ridges underneath the foreland basin. As the Indian Plate has flexed (bent) under the Eurasian Plate, the depressions and ridges have acted as flexible and stiff areas respectively, influencing the thickness of the foreland basin fill.

== Stratigraphy ==
The Himalayan foreland basin has been divided into different rock units in different parts of the basin. The earliest deposits of the foreland basin are marine mudstones, which are unconformably overlain by continental deposits. Neogene and Quaternary continental deposits make up the vast majority of the foreland basin fill. The stratigraphy of the foreland basin is best known from studies of uplifted strata in the Lesser and Sub-Himalaya, supplemented by data from the small amount of wells that test the hydrocarbon potential of the foreland basin drilled in India and Nepal.

=== Subathu/Bhainskati/Kohat formations—earliest foreland basin fill ===
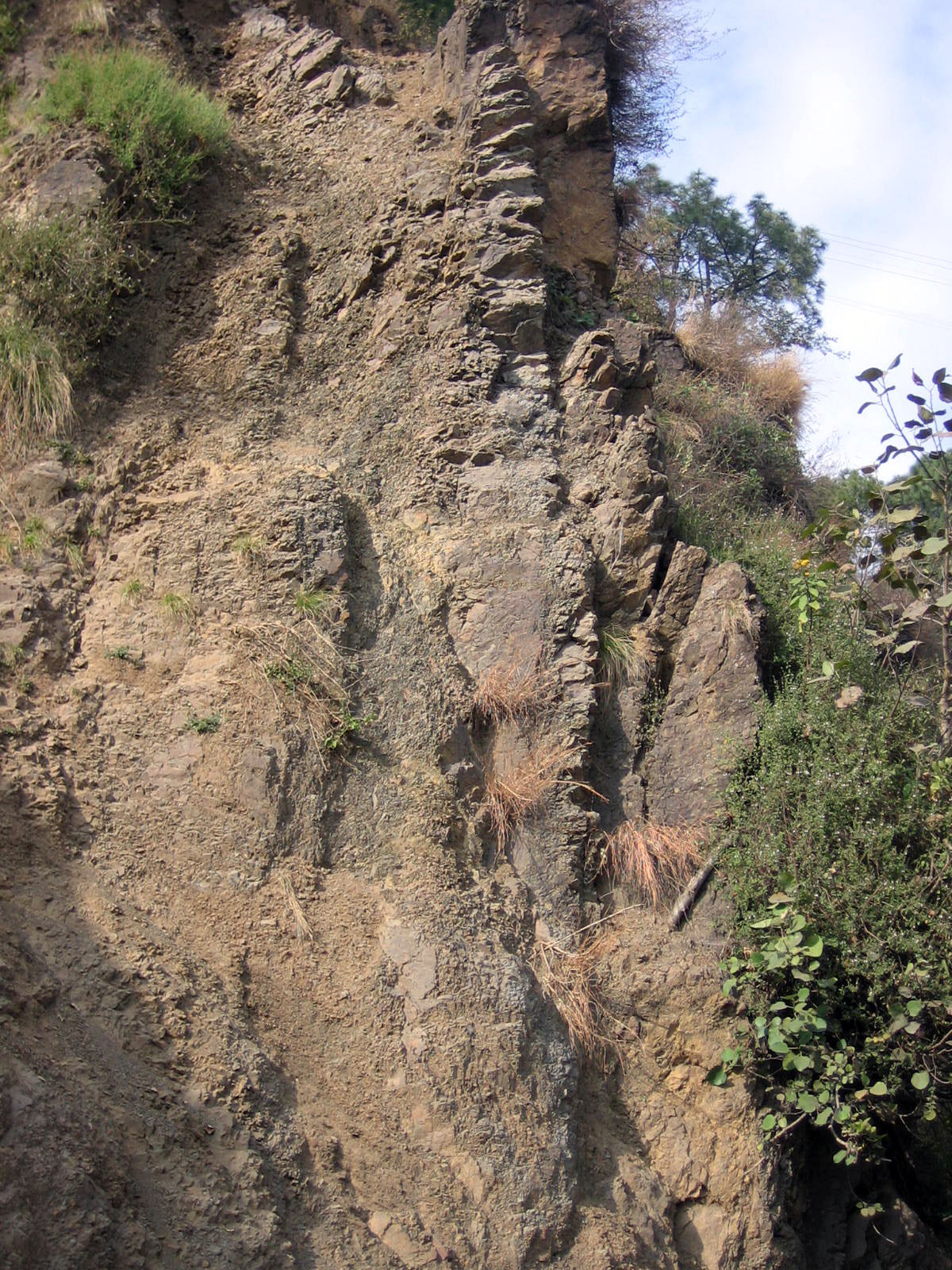
The Subathu formation containing predominantly of shales and minor amounts of sand. Field picture taken close to the city of Simia, India.

The Paleogene Subathu Formation of India (correlative to the Bhainskati Formation of Nepal, and the Kohat Formation of Pakistan) represents the oldest known foreland basin deposits, and unconformably overlies older strata. The Subathu Formation and equivalents are relatively thin intervals (<150 m) predominantly composed of fossiliferous, organic-rich black shale. These units are interpreted as shallow marine deposits. Marine to shallow marine facies in the form of shales and minor amounts of sand also consists of predominantly green mudstone with minor red facies and were dated back to the upper paleocene to lower mid eocene period based on the existence of Nummulites gathered from biostratigraphical data. petrographic interpretation of the green Subathu Formation were shown to be predominantly sedimentary with minor traces of serpentine schist input. Although the red facies shows a more felsitic and of volcanic origins, it entails that it originates from continental flood basalts of the Indian craton. The Subathu Formation was interpreted to be a preservation of the intense collision between the two plates in the western part of the foreland basin that leads to thrusting. An evidence of a silicified chert breccia strata existing just on top of the rigid precambrian basement was interpreted as a growth fault that developed as a result of compressional tectonics. The thrust slices in the sub-himalayan ranges now preserves some of the Subathu Formation. Although a debate has arise, it is inferred that some locations where the Subathu Formation is exposed are now considered to be the forebulge of the foreland basin as it is overlain by a much younger formation where a time hiatus or an unconformity has occurred. A time hiatus of an approximately 10 MA are inferred based on thermochronology and magnetostratigraphy between the Subathu and the overlying formation, but it is highly controversial.

=== Dagshai/Dharamsala/Dumre formations - earliest continental deposits ===
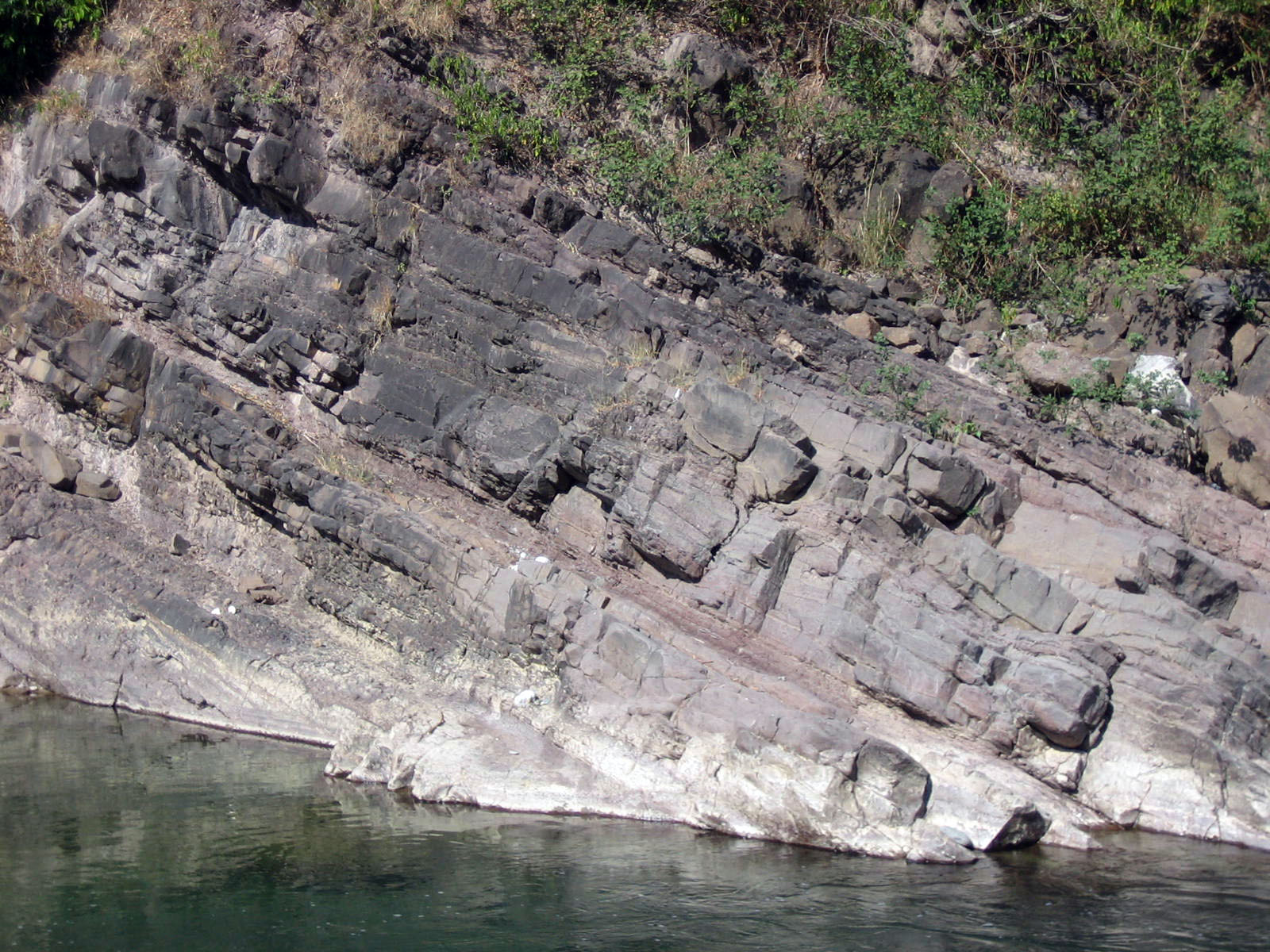
Field photo of the Dagshai formation exposed in the town of Palampur, North India.

The Dagshai Formation has been dated back to the Oligocene-Miocene Epoch where it consists of primarily fine grained material of alluvial origins. The Dagshai is distinctive by its red color consisting of mostly red mudstone, siltstone and grey sandstone. It is the oldest continental deposits and overlies the Subathu formation. A debate has arise of whether the Dagshai Formation overlies conformably or unconformably on top of the Subathu formation. recent research by dating detrital micas and fission track dating of detrital zircons shows conclusively that there is an unconformable nature between the Subathu and Dagshai Formation. Magnetostratigraphic data suggests that the Daghsai formation was deposited at approximately 27 Ma with 2 Ma uncertainty. Previously, multiple studies of facies interpretation of the Dagshai formation has been conducted with varying results regarding the past depositional environment; the presence of quartzitic sandstones was thought to be leftovers of an extensive and prolonged weathering in alluvial plains in which time tropical weathering was intensifying. The study by Yani Najman et al. interpreted that the Dagshai is a result of crevasse play and overbank floodplain facies because of an abundance of fine grained material; The general setting of the Dagshai Formation was concluded to be a past alluvial environment.

=== Siwalik Group - the thickest record of Himalayan detritus ===
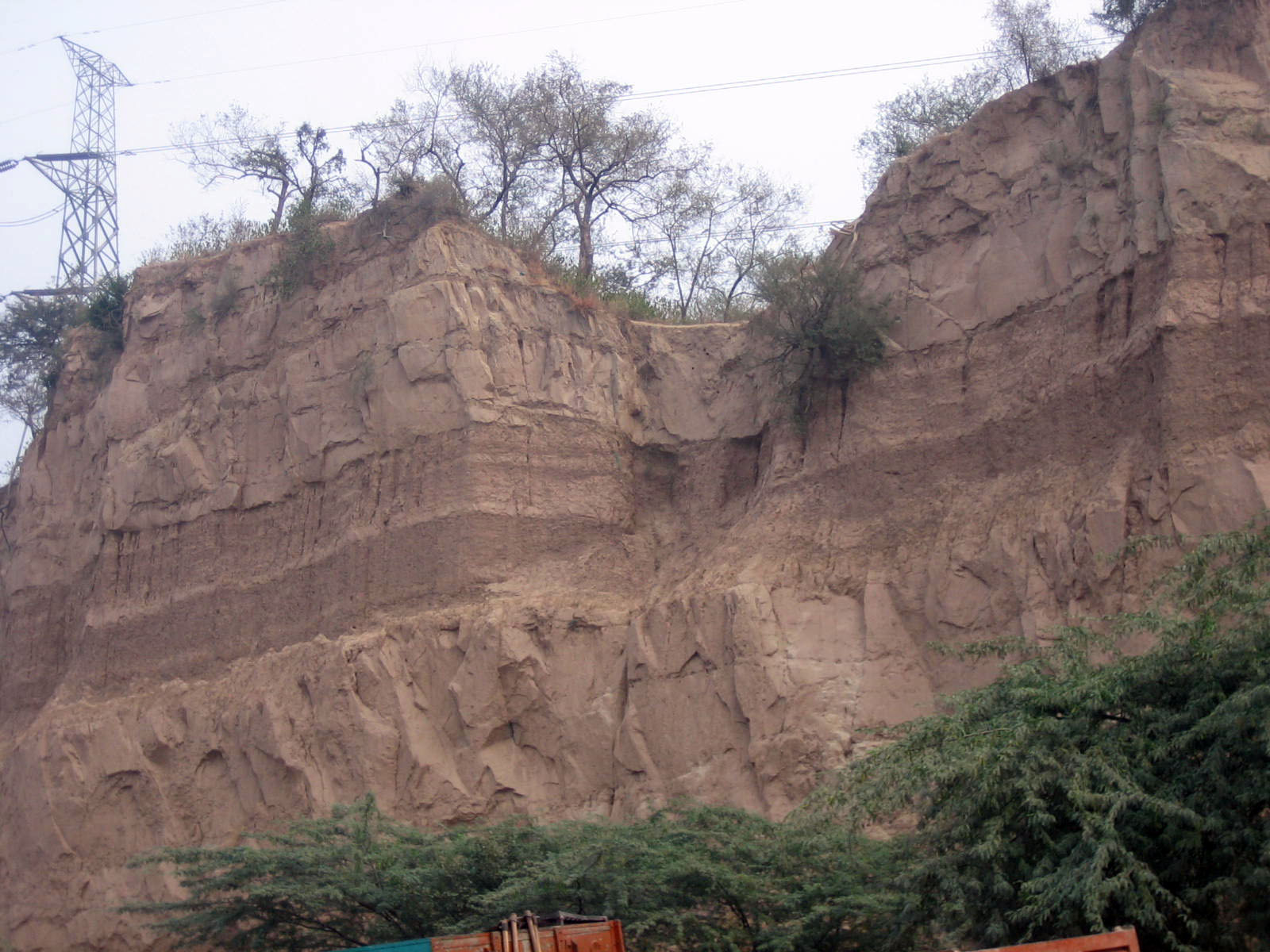
Field photo of the Siwalik sandstone complex taken in the city of Jawalamukhi, Northern India.

The Siwalik Group is a coarsening upward siliciclastic succession that makes up the thickest accumulation of detritus derived from the Himalaya in the foreland basin. The deposits are continental, and largely reflect deposition in floodplain, meandering river, and braided river environments. The Siwalik Group has been informally divided into the Upper, Middle, and Lower Siwalik since the early 1900s based on vertebrate fossil markers. Numerous researchers have broken the Siwalik Group into formations at different locations along the Himalaya, but these formations are local-scale, and cannot be correlated regionally. Boundaries of the Siwalik Group are diachronous, as they have been constrained to different times at different locations along the Himalaya. Because these boundaries are diachronous, it would be incorrect to assign a single specific age to the top or bottom of each subdivision.

==== Lower Siwalik ====
The Lower Siwalik is the base of the Siwalik Group. Deposition of the Lower Siwalik started in the Middle Miocene. The Lower Siwalik is characterized by alternating facies of sandstone and mudstone, deposited in fluvial and floodplain environments. Paleosol deposits are commonly interlayered with sandstone lenses on the scale of >1 m to 10 m. The Lower Siwalik is conformably overlain by the Middle Siwalik.

==== Middle Siwalik ====
The Middle Siwalik was deposited from the upper Miocene to the Pliocene. This unit is dominated by sandstone beds, punctuated by thin mudstone to siltstone horizons. The sediment supply for the Middle Siwalik originated from the main provenance of the rising Himalayas. With vertical facies variation from sandstone-mudstone to sandstone-mudstone-conglomerate with a thickness approximately 1,400 metres (4,600 ft). The unique part of this multistorey sand complex is the fact that it is underlain by a major erosional surface which extends laterally for hundreds of meters. individual stories vary in thickness and are recognized by the presence of intra and extra-formational clasts along the base of each storey. These facies assemblages suggests a deposition by sheet floods in a braided channel environment. The vertical stacking of this multistorey sandstone complex further indicates of a channel bar that migrates with channels existing predominantly as depositional sites. The Middle Siwalik is conformably overlain by the Upper Siwalik.

==== Upper Siwalik ====
The Pliocene to Quaternary Upper Siwalik is interpreted as the sedimentary record of the last phase of Himalayan orogeny. The Upper Siwalik predominantly consists of conglomerate facies in its upper layers and alternations of sandstone, mudstone and conglomerate in the lower part with a maximum thickness of 2,300 metres (7,500 ft). The Upper Siwalik is overlain by unlithified Quaternary sediments such as the Neogal conglomerate and red clays. The basal part of the Upper Siwalik shows predominantly of crudely stratified conglomerate, sandstone and massive mudstone which suggests a deposition of high energy conditions; this facies assemblage and characteristics are commonly found in gravel transport fans and suggests a deposition by gravelly braided rivers in medial to distal alluvial fan settings.

== Basin evolution ==
Continental collision process between the drifting Indian Plate and the Eurasian Plate starting at 60 Ma. Original video courtesy of Tanya Atwater and Peter Molnar. More information regarding the video can be found at http://www.geol.ucsb.edu/faculty/atwater/

=== Initial collision and onset of the foreland basin development ===
The Paleocene epoch marked the initial time of the India-Eurasia collision. Based on paleomagnetic records, around the time of 55 to 50 Ma the velocity of the Indian Plate decreased rapidly and is followed by a sequence of thrusts and compressional tectonics between the two plates which then triggered the development of the Himalayan Mountain belt. It is believed that the initial collision occurred close to the equator where deposits of bauxite is found within the stratigraphy of the foreland basin overlying a silicified chert breccia strata existing on the pre-existing basement of the basin. The chert breccia strata was interpreted as a growth fault in the fold thrust belt as a result of compressional tectonics. With the collision being an active ongoing process, it progressively generates weight which resulted a downward flexing of the subducting Indian Plate and created an accommodation space to be filled with sediments. The flexural subsidence of the basin is slow as a result of the hard and rigid precambrian basement making a relatively shallow foreland basin.

=== Active convergence ===
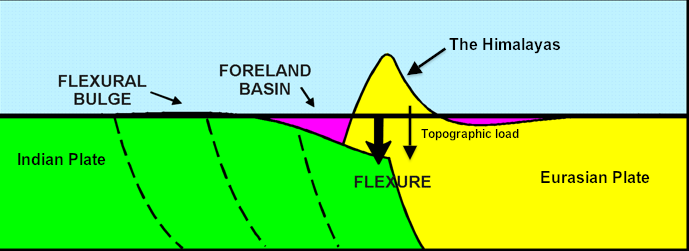
Topographic load exerted from the developing Himalayan mountain range results in the downward flexing of the Indian Plate. Modified from Egan and Williams, Dept. of Earth Sciences, Keele University

During the Eocene epoch the ongoing process of an active convergence between the two plates increased crustal thickening and further increased the load that originated from the Himalayan mountain belt. From Eocene to early Miocene time, thrusts and uplifts are occurring at the Himalayan zone. The initial development of the foreland basin indicated from the oldest marine deposits in the existing stratigraphy shows the basinal subsidence was shallow as a result of the rigid precambrian basement coupled with a slow rate of sedimentation and sediment starvation. The Eocene period also marked the onset of a shift from marine facies deposits on to fluvial deposits stratigraphically. Continued motion of the Indian Plate after the India-Asia collision further led the focus of the deformation of the Indian Plate across 200–300 kilometres (120–190 mi) of the marginal area of the Indian Shield. This type of event has resulted in intracontinental shortening. Major intracontinental shear associated with the Central Crystalline Zone has been also been recognized.

=== Climate change and erosion ===
The Oligocene-Miocene boundary has an important effect on the structure of the basin. Carbon Isotope data and Pollen analysis indicates of a climatic change around SE Asia which significantly increases humidity of the region. From this, reconstruction of monsoonal records was established and it is inferred that around 24-20 Ma is the time when the monsoon intensified. The intensification of the monsoon also resulted in intensification of erosion around the Himalayas. This erosion then caused a reduction in mass of the Himalaya which made the foreland basin partly invert, rebound, and essentially uplift. This is supported by the discovery of the older marine deposition of the Subathu formation in parts of the thrust slices in sub-Himalayas, at a high elevation than it would normally be found.

== Hydrocarbon potential ==
Despite the presence of gas seeps along the Himalaya, and over 70 years of hydrocarbon exploration, no commercially viable hydrocarbon fields have produced from the foreland basin succession. Exploration wells have been drilled in the Indian, Pakistani, and Nepalese portions of the basin.

Most of the drilled wells intersecting the Siwalik Group (Upper, Middle, and Lower Siwalik) indicate poor source rock potential. Organically rich Subathu Formation samples in the form of coal show total organic content levels up to 80%, suggesting the Subathu Formation (and correlative units) may have source rock potential. Despite the high TOC levels, the coals exhibit low hydrogen index which indicates the potential to only form gaseous hydrocarbons. Furthermore, it is assumed that the gaseous hydrocarbon potential by them may have been lost by tectonic events that occurred in the basin. This is evident by palynological rock study that further indicates of more than 96% of the samples taken from the Subathu Formation was organically lean. Exploratory wells for hydrocarbon exploration were also drilled in the town Jawalamukhi. Although the discovery of gas seepages around this area was recorded, currently it does not hold any commercial value to be produced.

== Active deformation of the foreland basin ==
Himalayan deformation was previously thought to stop at the foot of the Himalaya, or the northern boundary of the foreland basin (the Main Frontal Thrust). The Himalayan foreland basin was thus thought to be undeformed. Himalayan deformation has been shown to extend into the subsurface of the foreland basin, in the form of blind thrust faults, and strike-slip faults. These faults reach over 37 km south of the Main Frontal Thrust, and are responsible for several modern-day topographic highs. Active deformation of the foreland basin has only been mapped in one area of Nepal, but may be present in other regions.
