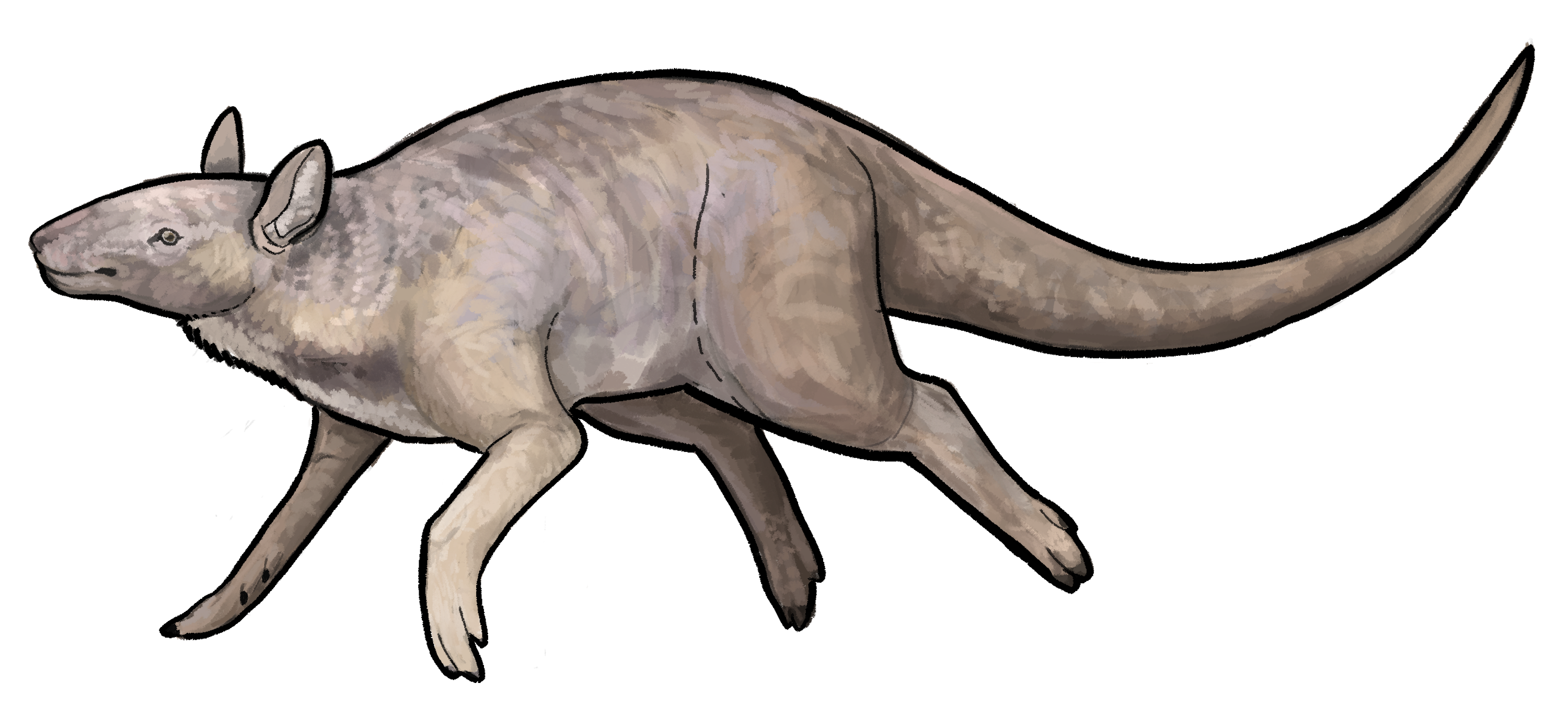
- Life restoration of Khirtharia inflata

Scientific classification
- Kingdom: Animalia
- Phylum: Chordata
- Class: Mammalia
- Order: Artiodactyla
- Family: †Raoellidae
- Genus: †Khirtharia; Pilgrim, 1940

Type species
- †Khirtharia dayi Pilgrim, 1940

Species
- †K. aurea Thewissen et al., 2001; †K. dayi Pilgrim, 1940; †K. inflata Kumar and Sahni, 1985; †K. major? Orliac and Ducrocq, 2012

Synonyms
- K. inflata synonymy: †Bunodentus inflatus Ranga Rao, 1972

= Khirtharia =

Khirtharia Temporal range: Eocene (Ypresian-Lutetian), 53–45 Ma

Genus of extinct mammal from the Middle Eocene

Khirtharia (/kərθɑːriə/) is an extinct genus of raoellid artiodactyl that inhabited what is now northern India and Pakistan and potentially China during the middle-upper Eocene (Ypresian to Lutetian, 53 to 45 million years ago). There are three species of Khirtharia: K. dayi, K. inflata, and K. aurea and a possible fourth species, K. major. Khirtharia is found primarily from Jammu and Kashmir and Northern Pakistan and is most commonly found in the Upper Subathu Group within Jammu and Kashmir of northern India. Khirtharia is notable for a well preserved skull of K. inflata, which allowed for obtaining an endocranial cast of the brain cavity.

The endocranial cast of K. inflata showed that the brain of Khirtharia was slightly smaller than that of the related Indohyus. The brain cavity had a volume of approximately 5.5 cubic centimeters, less than in contemporary artiodactyls, giving strong evidence that whales evolved from artiodactyls of relatively small brain sizes. It was also hypothesized that the small brain of Khirtharia could be an adaptation to a semi-aquatic life, supporting the position of Raoellidae as the sister group to whales (Cetacea).

As a raoellid, Khirtharia would be a relatively small, omnivorous, semiaquatic mammal. Khirtharia had the highest level of carnivory out of all raoellids. Khirtharia as a whole is relatively normal sized for a raoellid, but it had the largest variation in size within its genus. It had hooves and a large tail. Khirtharia was a good swimmer, and likely used this advantage to escape from predators.

== Discovery ==
The first remains of Khirtharia were unearthed in 1940 by Ernest Sheppard Pinfold while working for the Attock Oil Company, who stored the remains in the British Museum. He found the remains in the Khirthar fold belt, which is a foldbelt found in Pakistan created by the formation of the Himalayan mountains. Khirtharia was then named by Guy Ellcock Pilgrim in 1940 after he was invited to the museum by the head of geology and the fossils of Khirtharia were given to him by Pinfold, including remains found by other geologists in the Attock district of Punjab At the time, all of the remains of Khirtharia were extremely fragmentary. Guy Pilgrim named the first and type species K. dayi. It was named from a fragmentary mandible and maxilla with some of their respective premolars and molars. In 1972, the new species Bunodentus inflatus, named for its "inflated" teeth, was discovered by A. Ranga Rao. In 1980, Robert M. West suggested that Bunodentus, at the time known only from an isolated molar and fragmentary mandible, was synonymous with Khirtharia dayi, although this change was only officially enacted in 1985 by Kumar and Sahni who believed B. inflatus was different enough from K. dayi to warrant being placed under a different species (K. inflata). In 1978, Indohyus major was described by Hans Thewissen and colleagues from a single molar in Pakistan. It was named I. major due to the size of the tooth, being approximately twice the size of other raoellid teeth. In 2012, Orliac and Ducrocq found that the tooth of I. major was more similar to Khirtharia, and thus assigned the species to Khirtharia as K. major. In 2001, K. aurea was named by Thewissen and colleagues from material in the Chorgali formation of northern Pakistan. It was named after the golden color (aurea is Latin for golden) of the sediment the fossils were found in. K. aurea is the oldest species of Khirtharia and the oldest raoellid.

== Classification ==
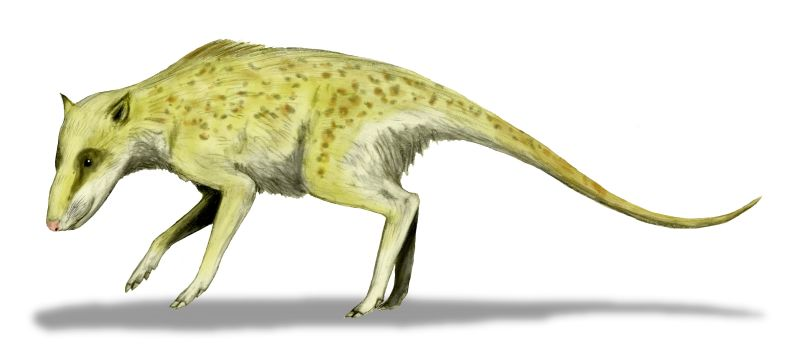
Drawing of Khirtharia major, previously thought to be a member of Indohyus.

The placement of Khirtharia has varied throughout the history of the taxon. Generally, it has been assigned to basal groups of artiodactyls, although it is currently a member of Raoellidae. When Khirtharia was first named by Pilgrim, it was assigned to Helohyidae. However, in 1958, Richard Dehm and Therese zu Oettingen-Spielberg moved Khirtharia, along with Haqueina, to Dichobunidae which was corroborated by Sahni and Khare in 1972 and Gingerich in 1977. Later in 1977, when Coombs and Coombs reevaluated Helohyidae, they determined that the remains of Khirtharia were not diagnostic of any particular family of artiodactyls, and therefore left Khirtharia as an artiodactyl of uncertain position. In 1980, Robert West reaffirmed Khirtharia's initial placement within Helohyidae. In 1981, the family Raoellidae was created, with Khirtharia being one of the three genera included, along with Raoella (a junior synonym of Indohyus) and Kunmunella. After the results of a phylogenetic analysis in 2012 by Orliac and Ducrocq, it was determined that Khirtharia, along with Metkatius, were the most derived members of Raoellidae. This result was confirmed by a phylogenetic analysis performed by Rana and colleagues in 2011 in their description of Rajouria. Raoellidae is widely considered to be the sister group to Cetacea (whales), and thus Khirtharia is closely related to cetaceans, but not a cetacean itself.

== Description ==
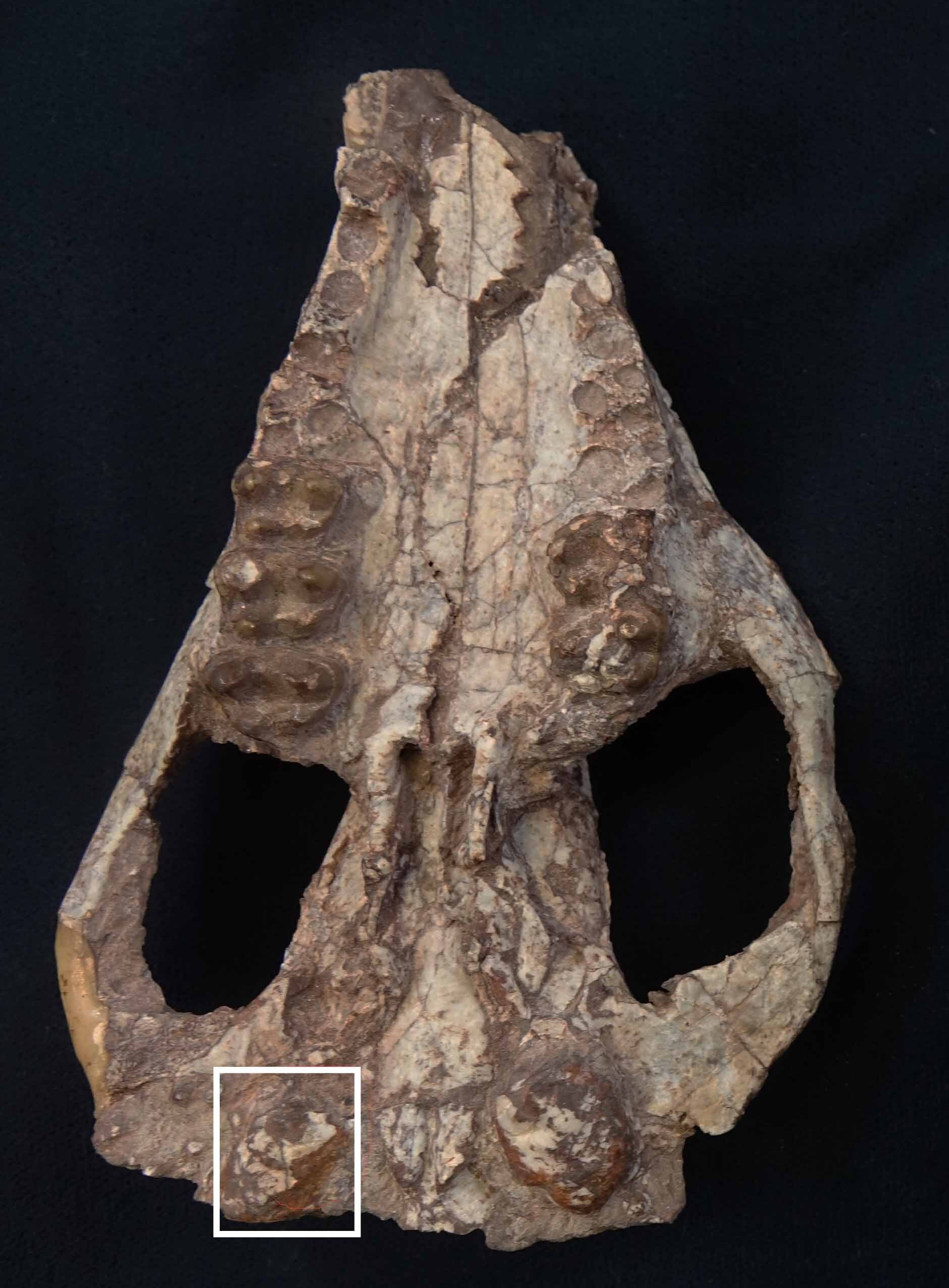
Skull of Indohyus, showing the teeth and auditory bullae

Raoellids were a group of mammals closely related to cetaceans. They were generally small and semiaquatic. In life, they would appear similar to the modern day chevrotain, but with a more dog-like snout and large, robust, tail. All members of Raoellidae had denser bones than average for an artiodactyl, hinting at their semiaquatic nature. Denser bones are characteristic of aquatic and semiaquatic animals, such as hippopotamuses and whales, because it counteracts the buoyancy of their lungs and thus enables the organism to maintain a neutral buoyancy more efficient for swimming. Khirtharia is a raoellid that lived during the early Lutetian age. It is most similar to Metkatius in that it had bunodont (bumpy and rounded cusped) teeth. As a raoellid, Khirtharia was relatively small, although there was large interspecific variety in size. Khirtharia's canines differ from Indohyus; in Indohyus the cingulum and styles are reduced while in Khirtharia they are not. The upper canines of Khirtharia show a much larger difference between crown and root compared to Indohyus. The upper incisors of Indohyus are separated by small gaps, while they are not in Khirtharia.

=== Khirtharia dayi ===
Khirtharia dayi is the type and smallest species of Khirtharia, and one of the two smallest species of Raoellidae as a whole. Within K. dayi, there are two similar but distinct morphs: a more common one with relatively small molars and the other, more rare, one with relatively large molars.

By being in the same genus, K. dayi's skull is probably similar to the better-preserved skull of K. inflata. The snout is broad. There is a prominent preorbital foramen above the third premolar. The orbits are open posteriorly showing that Khirtharia was likely omnivorous or herbivorous because predators usually have forward facing eyes for a better ability to focus on prey, while herbivores have sideways facing eyes for a larger field of vision which enables them to see predators from a wider range of angles. The jugal bone connects to the maxilla above the second molar. The internal nares connect to the throat just after the third molar. There is a large parietal crest, although a relatively minor sagittal one. There is a specimen of K. dayi where the entire mandible is preserved except for the most posterior portion of the coronoid. Symphysis occurs before the first premolar in one specimen, although in another it ends at the seconds premolar. The mandible is shallow for the first two premolars, but it quickly grows in height by about 20% with the last two. The ramus begins immediately after the third molar. It is tall and vertical. The angle is enlarged, especially posteriorly so that it extends bast the head of the mandible.

For the upper dentition of K. dayi, the first premolar is single-rooted, while the second is double-rooted. The second premolar is narrow and non-molarized; in life it would have appeared similar to a canine. The tooth is widest posteriorly because of a relatively large postero-lingual (tongue-side) shelf. The third premolar is similar to the second; it is non-molarized and has a postero-lingual shelf. However, the third molar was slightly larger and there were large vertical grooves. The fourth premolar represents a transition from the canine-like first to third premolars to the molars. There are only two cones on the tooth, both situated in the front portions. Because of this, the posterior section of the tooth is low and flattened. The cone on the labial (lip) side of the tooth is larger than the protocone, which it is connected to by a ridge. The first lower molar is square-shaped. There are four large cusps which are rounded; they were likely used for crushing plant matter. The paracone is the largest cusp while the hypocone is the smallest. The first molar has large crests on the front and back cusps, while the outer ridge of the tooth is fairly weak, giving it the illusion that it is wider than it is long. The second lower molar is significantly larger than the first and, as opposed to being square in shape, is trapezoidal. Cingulum are less apparent than the first molar. The second molar has bulbous cusps. As with the first molar, the paracone is the largest of the cusps.While the first and second premolars were not preserved, Ranga Rao postulated that the first lower premolar was single-rooted while the second premolar was double-rooted. The third premolar is large and triangular, with prominent cingulum. The fourth premolar is slightly larger than the third. It is more premolariform than the upper fourth premolar. The lower molars of Khirtharia lack the paraconid. The lower molars are highly bunodont. There is a large ridge connecting the protocoled and metaconid and a large ridge connecting the hypoconid and entoconid. The largest molar is the third.

=== Khirtharia inflata ===
Khirtharia inflata differs from K. dayi in terms of size in that it is between the size of the two morphs and slight dental differences. The premaxilla is elongated and the maxilla is tall. The incisors are caniniform and raptorial, likely adapted to seizing prey. Compared to K. dayi, K, inflata has more bunodont and squarish upper molars; the upper molars of K. inflata are similar to the lower molars of K. dayi. The lower molars are also more bunodont and the hypoconid is the largest cusp (in K. dayi the metacone is the largest cusp). The lower molars are also longer than in K. dayi. All molars have cusps separated from each other by valleys. The skull is relatively rectangular, with the height staying of the skull slowly decreasing anteriorly until the beginning of the nostril openings, where it is about half of its maximum height. While there is a sagittal crest, it is minor.

=== Khirtharia aurea ===
Khirtharia aurea is known from relatively sparse remains from the older Chorgali formation (53-48 mya). Depending on the validity of K. major as a species of Khirtharia, K. aurea is either the largest or second largest species of Khirtharia. The molars of K. aurea have more prominent cingulum than in both K. dayi and K. inflata. Unlike K. inflata, the hypocone is reduced to the point of being smaller than the protocone and the cusps are (unsurprisingly) less inflated than in K. inflata. The two known upper molars are large and bunodont. In the left first molar, the metacone is taller and narrower than the protocone, which is the largest cusp overall. The hypocone is much smaller than the protocone and shifted labially. In the third molar, the paracone being the largest cusp. The protocone is less tall than the paracone, although roughly the same in the other dimensions. In 2007, a study came out stating that the holotype specimen, previously identified as a third molar, could possibly be a second molar.

=== Khirtharia major ===
Khirtharia major is a possible species of Khirtharia. It was originally assigned to Indohyus, before being reassigned to Khirtharia with the discovery of new fossils. K. major may not be a raoellid, but rather a basal dichobunid or diacodexeid. K. major is known only from two molars, one of which is from the Shanghuang formation in China, extending the range of Raoellidae outside of the Indian subcontinent. It is the largest species of Khirtharia and the largest raoellid as a whole; it is twice the size of Indohyus indirae. K. major is different from all other species of Khirtharia in that it has an elongated third molar, larger hypocone, and a variety of other small morphological differences.

== Phylogeny ==
After a phylogenetic analysis by Orliac and Ducrocq (2012), they found that a molar of a raoellid from China was most closely related to Khirtharia than to Indohyus, and subsequently reclassified it from I. major to K. major. The study did not include Rajouria due to Rajouria only being described after this study was published. Rana et al. (2021), in their description of Rajouria, conducted a phylogenetic analysis of Raoellidae. They used a near-identical method to Orliac and Ducrocq, but added the material for Rajouria and two extra characters related to the teeth. This study recovered Rajouria as the sister taxon to all other raoellids, and placed Haqueina outside of Raoellidae. These results are displayed in the cladogram below:

- Raoellidae
  - Rajouria
  - - Kunmunella
    - Indohyus
    - - Metkatius
      - Khirtharia

== Paleobiology ==
=== Diet ===
Khirtharia's diet is largely based upon its dental structure. Khirtharia, as the most bunodont of any raoellid, was likely the most omnivorous (as opposed to the other, primarily herbivorous, raoellids). This is because bunodonty is characteristic of omnivorous taxa. Additionally, Khirtharia had caniniform incisors suited for catching and holding struggling prey. In terms of diet as a function of carnivory, Khirtharia would be most similar to Metkatius, however due to Khirtharia's significantly larger size, it would probably go after larger prey. Additionally, Khirtharia had even more bunodont teeth than Metkatius, suggesting that it was more omnivorous. As both a transitionary species and a medium-sized omnivore, Khirtharia was probably a generalist in terms of diet.

=== Locomotion ===
Due to being a raoellid, Khirtharia was almost certainly semi-aquatic. Initially, it was thought that Khirtharia was more terrestrial than Indohyus due to oxygen isotope information, but the thickening of parts of the skull in Khirtharia provides evidence that it was more similar to Indohyus in terms of how aquatic it was. It can be inferred that Khirtharia had a similar style of locomotion to its close relative Indohyus, due to their similar morphology and close relation and niche. Indohyus most likely had denser bones than land animals to walk under water, similar to hippos, and as opposed to modern-day fully aquatic mammals. Therefore, Khirtharia most likely had denser bones to act as a ballast for walking in water, not to swim, and it would have been a poor runner on land due to the increased weight. Therefore, Khirtharia was probably an omnivorous semi-aquatic chevrotain-like creature.

=== Niche ===
Since Khirtharia was a relatively small-sized mammal, it likely would have been on a fairly low trophic level. This can be evidenced with the fact that it had sideways facing eyes, which is an adaptation found primarily in prey to help them detect predators more easily. Khirtharia, along with all other raoellids, would probably try to evade predators by hiding in bodies of water, similar to the modern day chevrotain.

== Paleoecology ==
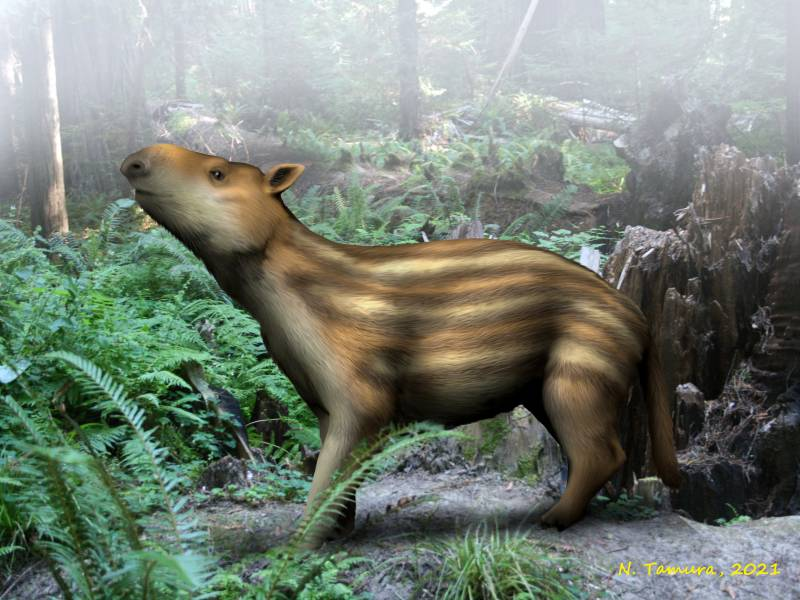
Life restoration of Anthracobune, a small perissodactyl which shared some of its range with Khirtharia.

Khirtharia inhabited Kashmir, northern India, about 50 million years ago, at the same time as the beginning of the formation of the Himalayan mountains. India was an island subcontinent during the temporal range of Khirtharia, and the process of collision and subsequent mountain building of the Himalayas had only just begun during Khirtharia's emergence. At the time, Kashmir was a wet, tropical flood basin with many shallow marine formations; this is explained by the fact it was an equatorial coastal region during the Early Eocene Climatic Optimum, where temperatures were significantly higher than normal. This led to the global climate being a "greenhouse Earth", meaning that there were no year-round ice caps. There were likely large rainforests and mangrove forests along the coastlines of northern India at the time, coinciding with plankton blooms due to the extreme heat. The climate was very humid.

Khirtharia inhabited the Ganda Kas and Lammidhan localities and Chorgali and Kuldana formations in Pakistan and the Subathu formation in India. Khirtharia inflata and Khirtharia aurea are known only from the Subathu and Chorgali formations respectively. K. dayi is the most widespread species of Khirtharia, being found at the Chorkkali area and Kuldana formation. Khirtharia is commonly found in red to grey, maroon shale.

Among its closest relatives, Khirtharia coexisted with every other species of Raoellidae (Kunmunella, Indohyus, Metkatius, Rajouria) and many early pakicetids, ambulocetids, and protocetids; pakicetids: (Pakicetus, Ichthyolestes), ambulocetids: (Gandakasia), protocetids: (Protocetus, Indocetus). Khirtharia also coexisted with Anthrocobune, Pilgrimella, Haqueina, and Lammidhania, which were small perissodactyls, and Eotitanops, a brontothere.

== See also ==
- Evolution of cetaceans
- Cetacea
- Pakicetus
- Glossary of mammalian dental topography
