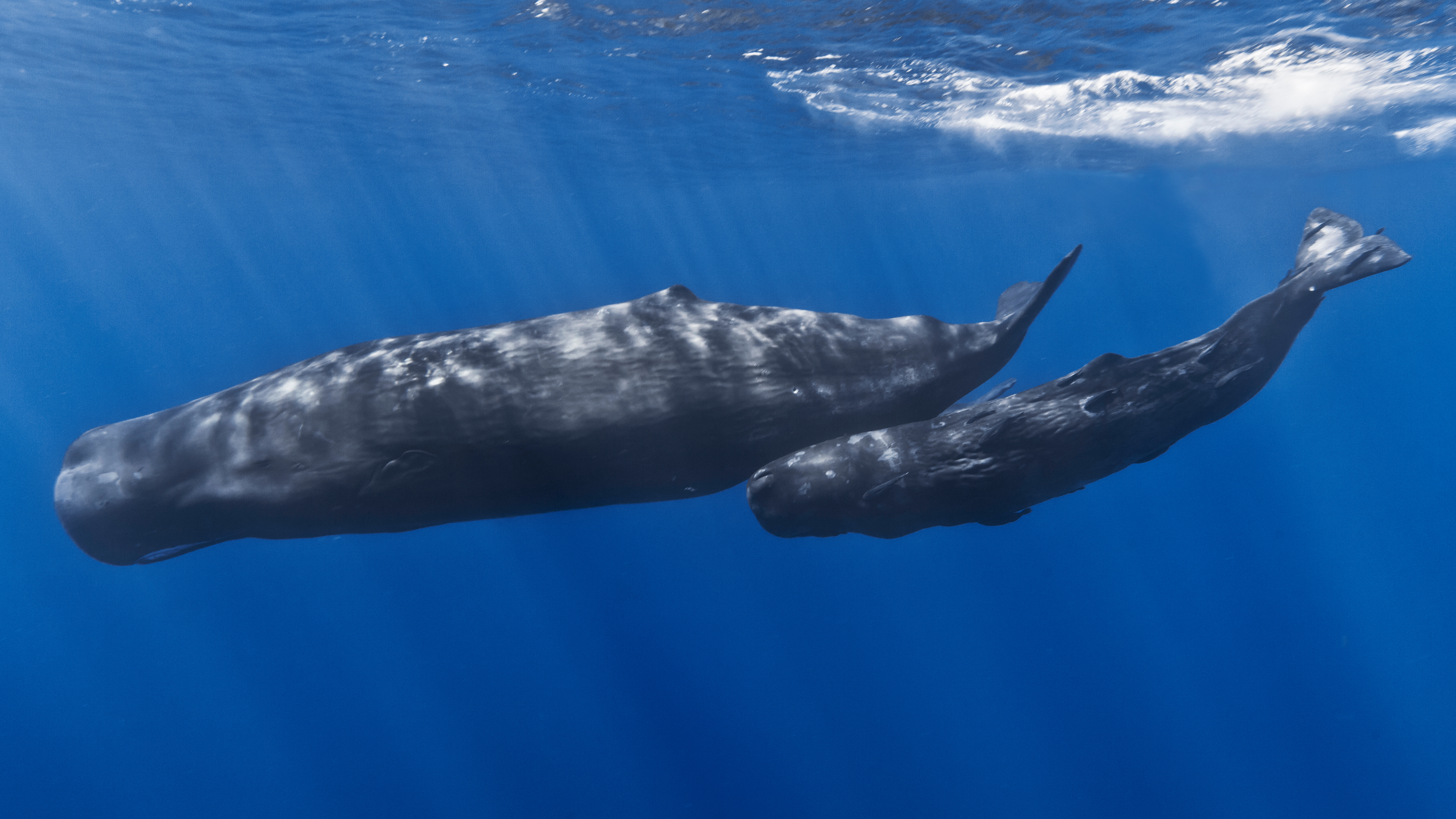
- Cachalot with calf
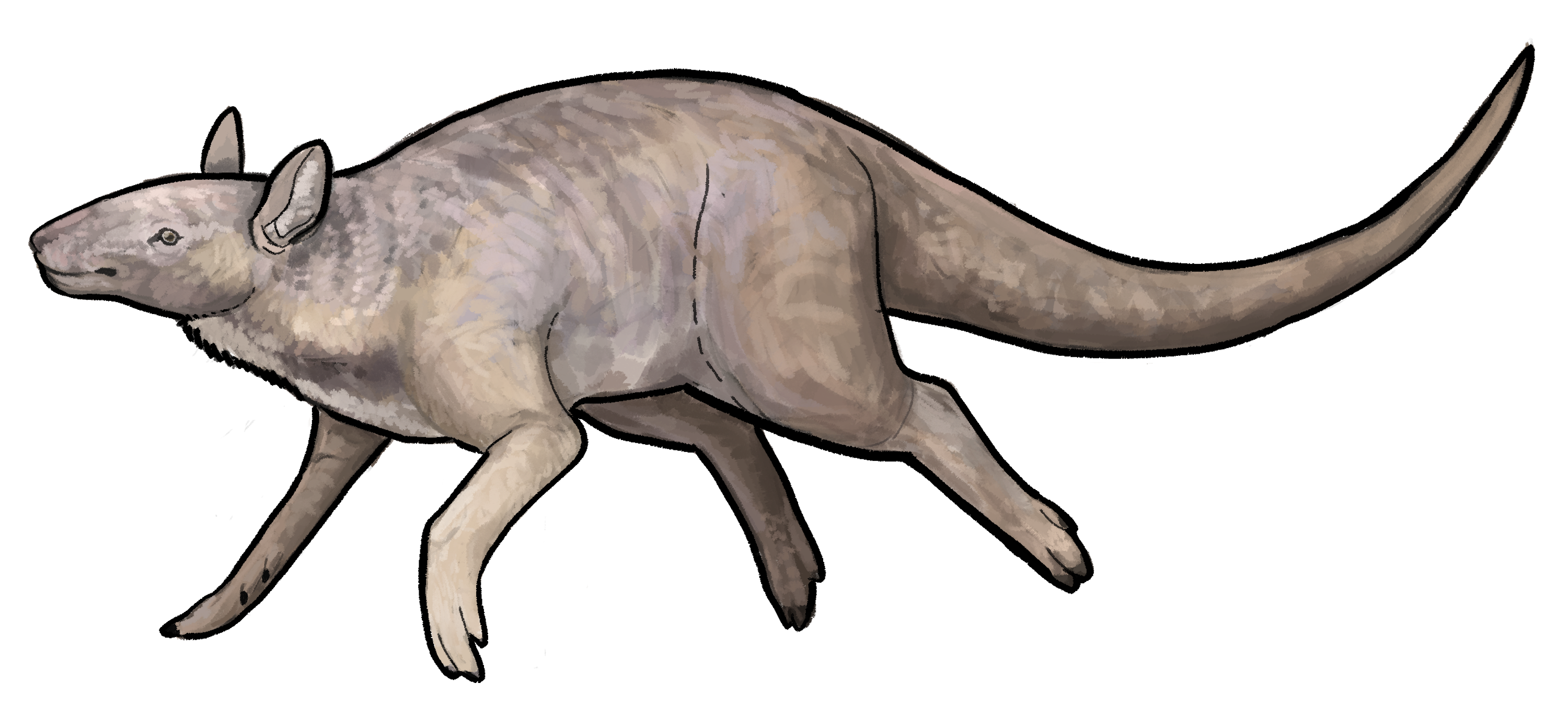
- Restoration of Khirtharia inflata

Scientific classification
- Kingdom: Animalia
- Phylum: Chordata
- Class: Mammalia
- Order: Artiodactyla
- Suborder: Whippomorpha
- Clade: Cetaceamorpha; Spaulding, O'Leary, & Gatesy, 2009

Subgroups
- †Raoellidae; Cetacea

Synonyms
- Pancetacea Deméré, 2013 [2020]

= Cetaceamorpha =

Cetaceamorpha Temporal range: 53.5–0 Ma Early Eocene–present

Clade of mammals

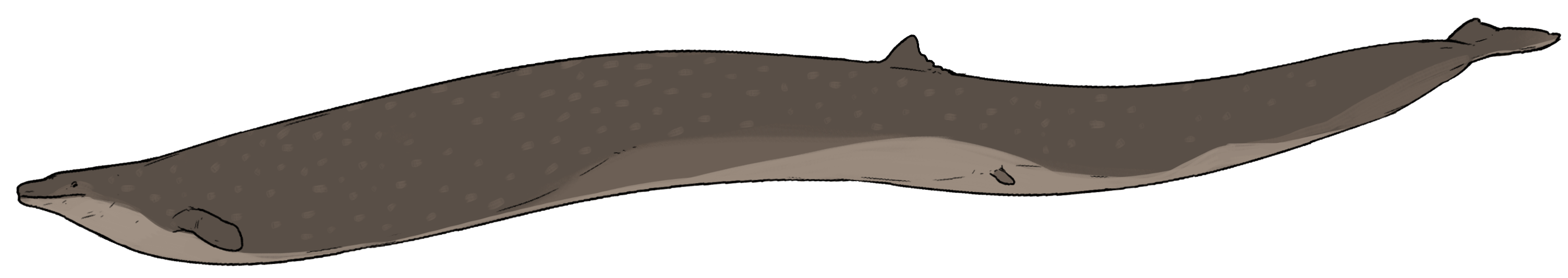
Basilosaurus, an extinct Cetacean.

Cetaceamorpha (sometimes also known as Pan-Cetacea) is a clade of whippomorph artiodactyl mammals that was named in 2009 by Spaulding, O'Leary, & Gatesy. The authors defined it as the total clade including Cetacea plus all extinct taxa more closely related to extant cetaceans than to any other living species. This was meant to replace the total clade definition of Cetacea, with the authors opting to restrict its scope to the crown group, i.e., extant species. In 2020 Deméré published the name "Pan-Cetacea" under the PhyloCode. While Deméré admits both Cetaceamorpha and Pan-Cetacea are synonymous, and the former exists first, he argues that the creation of Pan-Cetacea is more in accordance with the proper guidelines of the PhyloCode using the "pan" prefix.

Members of this group include Cetacea and the extinct Eocene family Raoellidae. Both sister clades shared dense bones and the presence of the auditory bulla.
