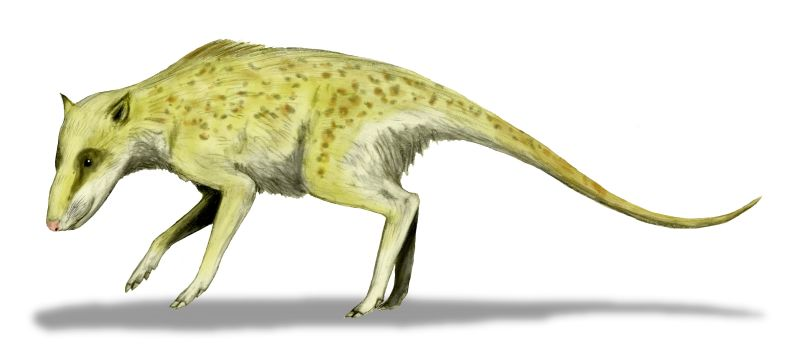
- Life restoration of Khirtharia

Scientific classification
- Kingdom: Animalia
- Phylum: Chordata
- Class: Mammalia
- Order: Artiodactyla
- Clade: Cetaceamorpha
- Family: †Raoellidae; Sahni et al. 1981

Type genus
- Raoella Sahni & Khare, 1971

Genera
- Indohyus; Khirtharia; Kunmunella; Metkatius; Rajouria

= Raoellidae =

Raoellidae Temporal range: Eocene (Ypresian–Lutetian), 53–45 Ma

Family of extinct artiodactyls

Raoellidae (/reɪoʊˈɛlɪdeɪ/) is a family of extinct semiaquatic artiodactyls from the middle Eocene (early Lutetian) closely related to cetaceans. They are known primarily from northern India and Pakistan, especially in the Subathu Group of India, although potential remains of the raoellid Khirtharia have been found in northern China. They are relatively small animals; on average, raoellids were the size of a red fox. However, Khirtharia major, at about twice the size of an average-sized raoellid, would have been approximately the size of a coyote. Meanwhile, the smallest raoellid, Metkatius, was roughly the size of a house cat.

Raoellidae is of particular importance to the understanding of cetacean evolution due to representing a transitional form between fully terrestrial artiodactyls and the semi-aquatic pakicetids. The close relation to Cetacea was found when one of the technicians working for Hans Thewissen accidentally broke a fossilized skull of Indohyus. Thewissen noticed the prominent auditory bulla which is similar to cetaceans. Then, he took the cross section of one of the bones of Indohyus and noticed it was much thicker than those of terrestrial mammals, hinting at an aquatic lifestyle and confirming their close relation to whales.

== Etymology ==
The family Raoellidae is named after the genus Raoella. Raoella itself was named after A. Ranga Rao, a geologist who worked extensively on raoellids. However, Raoella was synonymized with Indohyus by Kumar and Sahni (1985), which was reaffirmed by Thewissen, Gingerich, and Russel (1987). Due to the rules of taxonomic nomenclature, the name Raoellidae stayed despite Raoella no longer being valid.

== Characteristics ==
Raoellids are distinct for their semiaquatic nature, which is believed to represent a transitional form from basal artiodactyls to more derived forms like cetaceans. Raoellids were generally diminutive creatures that were primarily herbivorous, although, similar to a modern-day raccoon, they would have likely been opportunistic and eaten other animals on a somewhat regular basis, especially in the case of the more derived hyperbunodont forms of raoellids (Khirtharia and Metkatius). Raoellids would have almost certainly been furry, unlike their closest living relatives. As artiodactyls, raoellids would have been digitigrade and had hooves, but they would not have been as large as modern non-cetacean artiodactyls, and raoellids' other toes would have been visible in life.

Raoellidae was initially defined based on relatively few characteristics. They were thought to be basal artiodactyls with moderately long snouts that were distinguished from other mammals primarily by bunolophodont molars and other dental features. It was also noted that the raoellids appeared similar to the perissodactyls of the same region. This was interpreted as raoellids having immigrated to the region, although they also said that Raoellidae was not very similar to Asian artiodactyls, which could be interpreted as raoellids being, native to the Indian subcontinent. Theodor, Erfert, and Métias revised the definition of Raoellidae. Instead of having bunolophodont teeth, they believed raoellids to be very bunodont animals that have a variation in how lophodont they are. Raoellids were defined as having non-molariform premolars and molars that lack the paraconid/paraconule. The definition of Raoellidae was again modified by Orliac and Ducrocq (2012). According to them, raoellids are distinguished as a family by the absence of a paraconid, along with the reduction of the hypoconulid and parastyle. The teeth contain a large basin and are specialized for shearing. The first to third premolars lost the paracone completely along with one of their roots. The fourth premolar, in contrast, is double-rooted and has endocristae that form a transverse loph.

== Classification ==
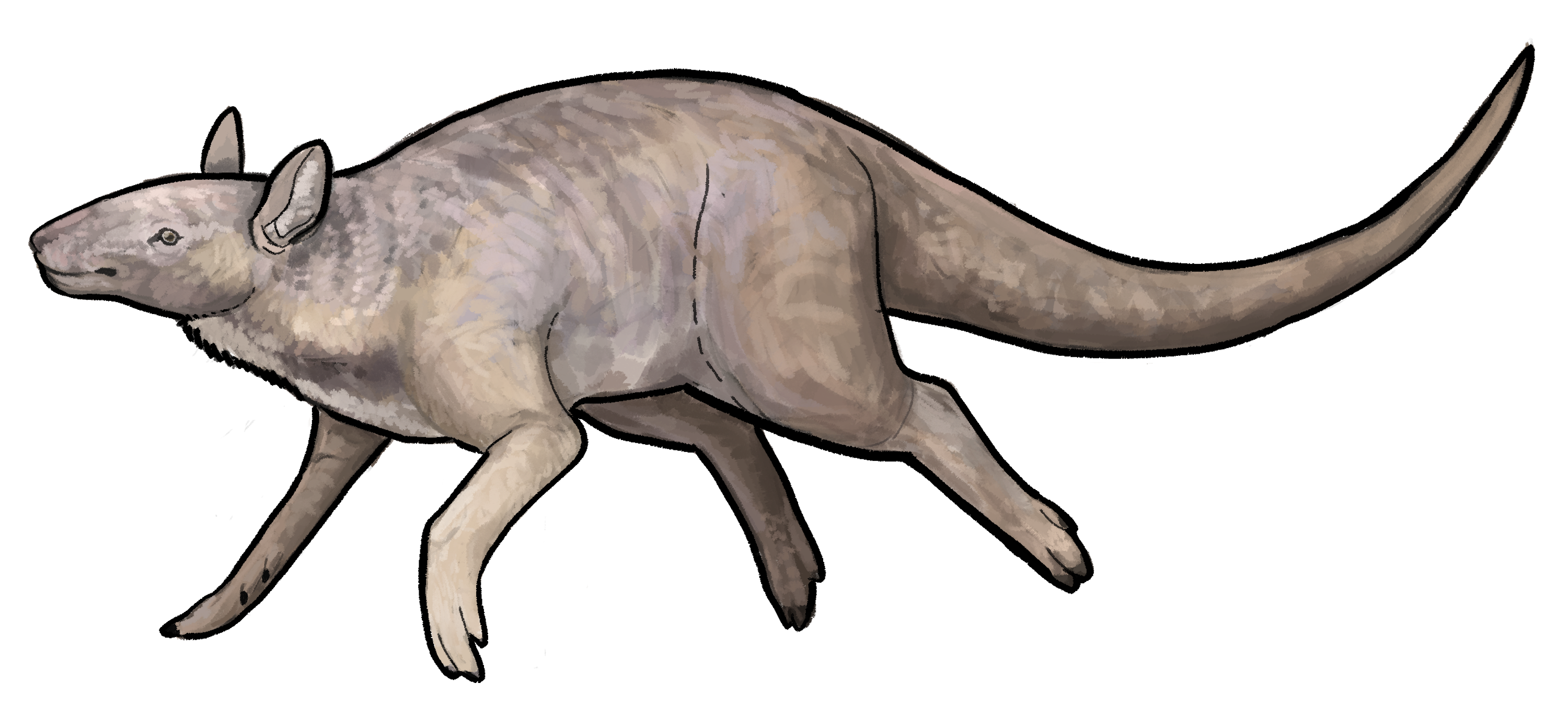
Life restoration of Khirtharia inflata

Most raoellids were initially placed in clades of basal placental mammals, usually those within Artiodactyla. Indohyus was initially placed within Choeropotamidae, which is the family including the most basal ancodonts, Khirtharia and Kunmunella were first assigned to Helohyidae, and Raoella was initially placed within Anthracotheriidae. Many raoellids were also placed within Dichobunidae, in part due to Helohyidae being classified within Dichobunidae during the time when most raoellids were being named.

Raoellidae was named by Sahni et al. (1981) as the clade including the last common ancestor of Khirtharia, Kunmunella, and Raoella and all of its descendants. In 1985, the new species Metkatius was added to Raoellidae. The same study ruled that Raoella was a junior synonym of Indohyus and subsequently replaced Raoella with Indohyus as a member of Raoellidae. In 1987, Thewissen, Gingerich, and Russel merged Kunmunella into Indohyus and separated Bunodentus from Khirtharia but kept it within Raoellidae. They also noted that Haqueina could possibly be a raoellid. In 2001, Thewissen, Williams, and Hussain reverted all of the changes made to Raoellidae by Thewissen, Gingerich, and Russel (1987) and included Haqueina as a raoellid. Orliac and Ducrocq (2012) recovered the same result except for not including Haqueina. Rajouria was added to Raoellidae in the paper describing it.

=== External phylogeny ===
When Raoellidae was first named by Sahni et al. (1980), it was placed as a basal group of artiodactyls. Sahni et al. also noted that despite all being basal families of artiodactyls, Raoellidae was not close morphologically to Dichobunidae or Helohyidae. In 1987, Thewissen, Gingerich, and Russel maintained this stance, although stated that Raoellidae could be somewhat closely related to Dacrytheriinae.

Thewissen et al. (2007), found well-preserved remains of the raoellid Indohyus, which allowed for a phylogenetic analysis of Raoellidae within Artiodactyla. The only raoellids they included in the analysis were Indohyus and Khirtharia.

- Cetaceamorpha
  - Cetacea
    - Pakicetus
    - - Ambulocetus
      - - Rodhocetus
        - Artiocetus
  - Raoellidae
    - Khirtharia
    - Indohyus

They found that Raoellidae was the sister group to Cetacea. Raoellidae and Cetacea were observed to be the only members of Cetaceamorpha (all whippomorphs more closely related to cetaceans than to hippopotamuses). This result was due to the auditory bulla found in Indohyus's skull and the denser bones characteristic of an aquatic or semi-aquatic lifestyle.

Orliac and Ducrocq (2012), when investigating the remains of a possible raoellid from China, did a phylogenetic analysis of Raoellidae in relation to early artiodactyls and cetaceans. They included Kunmunella, Indohyus, Metkatius, and Khirtharia in the analysis. The only cetacean they included was Pakicetus.

- - Diacodexis
  - - Gujaratia
    - Cetaceamorpha
      - Cetacea
      - Raoellidae
        - Kunmunella
        - Indohyus
        - - Metkatius
          - Khirtharia

This study also found that Raoellidae was the sister group to Cetacea, even when using a more complete data set of raoellids. They also found Diacodexeidae to be paraphyletic, although this result is not very meaningful due to the small sample size of diacodexids.

=== Internal phylogeny ===
After a phylogenetic analysis by Orliac and Ducrocq (2012), they found that a molar of a raoellid from China was most closely related to a previously unnamed species of Khirtharia, placing it under this genus as the new species K. major. The phylogenetic tree that resulted from their analysis placed Haqueina outside of Raoellidae in the clade Dichobunidae, a group of artiodactyls not closely related to cetaceans. The study did not include Rajouria due to Rajouria only being described after this study was published. It found that Raoellidae is monophyletic. Kunmunella is the most basal member of Raoellidae, followed by Indohyus, and then Metkatius and Khirtharia.

Rana et al. (2021), in their description of Rajouria, conducted a phylogenetic analysis of Raoellidae. They used a near-identical method to Orliac and Ducrocq, but added scorings for Rajouria and two extra characters related to the teeth. This study also placed Haqueina outside of Raoellidae. However, they noted that H. haquei was much more similar to raoellids than H. haichinensis, which was the species included in their phylogenetic analysis. This study reaffirmed the monophyly of Raoellidae. Rajouria is the most basal member of the family. Kunmunella and Indohyus are both equally basal members of Raoellidae, and the exact relationship between them is uncertain. Metkatius and Khirtharia are most closely related to each other and are the most derived members of Raoellidae.

- Raoellidae
  - Rajouria gunnelli
  - - Indohyus indirae
    - - Kunmunella kalakotensis
      - Kunmunella transversa
    - - Metkatius kashmiriensis
      - - Khirtharia dayi
        - Khirtharia inflata
        - Khirtharia cf. major

== See also ==
- Evolution of cetaceans
- Glossary of mammalian dental topography

== Sources ==
- Dehm, Richard; Oettingen-Spielberg, Therese zu (1958). Paläontologische und geologische Untersuchungen im Tertiär von Pakistan. 2. Die mitteleocänen Säugetiere von Ganda Kas bei Basal in Nordwest-Pakistan. Abhandlungen / Neue Folge, 91. Munich: Beck. OCLC 163296508.
- Kumar, K.; Sahni, A. (1985). "Eocene mammals from the upper Subathu Group, Kashmir Himalaya, India". Journal of Vertebrate Paleontology. 5 (2): 153–68. Bibcode:1985JVPal...5..153K. doi:10.1080/02724634.1985.10011853. OCLC 4649653478.
- Rao, A Ranga (1971). "New mammals from Murree (Kalakot Zone) of the Himalayan foothills near Kalakot, Jammu and Kashmir state, India". Journal of the Geological Society of India. 12 (2): 124–34.
- Sahni, A.; Bhatia, S. B.; Hartenberger, J. L.; Jaeger, J. J.; Kumar, K.; Sudre, J.; Vianey-Liaud, M. (1981). "Vertebrates from the Subathu Formation and comments on the biogeography of the Indian subcontinent during the early Paleogene". Bulletin of the Geological Society of France. 23 (6): 689–95. doi:10.2113/gssgfbull.S7-XXIII.6.689.
