= Rajouria =

Rajouria Temporal range: Eocene (Lutetian), 48–45 Ma

Scientific classification
- Kingdom: Animalia
- Phylum: Chordata
- Class: Mammalia
- Order: Artiodactyla
- Family: †Raoellidae
- Genus: †Rajouria; Rana et al., 2021
- Species: †R. gunnelli

Binomial name
- †Rajouria gunnelli Rana et al., 2021

Genus of extinct mammal from Eocene Epoch

Rajouria, named after the Rajouri district in the Indian province of Jammu and Kashmir, is an extinct raoellid artiodactyl from the middle-upper Eocene (early Lutetian). There is only a single species of Rajouria, Rajouria gunnelli, which is named after Dr. Greg Gunnell. Rajouria is known from relatively little remains, with only mandibular and maxillary fragments with their respective teeth being preserved. Rajouria is the newest member of Raoellidae, having been named in 2021.

== Discovery ==
Rajouria was discovered in 2021 near the town of Aiji in the East-Aiji 2 locality of Kashmir. The initial remains of Rajouria were all found in proximity to each other and are the only remains assigned to Rajouria.

== Classification ==
When it was first discovered, Rajouria was placed within Raoellidae. Its position as a raoellid has remained stable, although it is not certain where exactly it is within Raoellidae. In the phylogenetic analysis of Raoellidae by Rana et al., Rajouria was placed as the most basal raoellid due to the presence of the paracone on lower molars and a relatively simple fourth premolar. However, Weppe et al. noted that, similar to Metkatius, Rajouria possessed somewhat lophodont molars that represented a transition in Raoellidae from the large lophs of Indohyus and Kunmunella to the extreme bunodonty of Khirtharia. Therefore Rajouria could also be an intermediate raoellid instead of the most basal member.

== Description ==
Rajouria is an average-sized raoellid with teeth similar to Indohyus and Kunmunella although slightly more bunodont.

=== Upper dentition ===
There are many fine grooves on all of the teeth. While the second premolar is still erupting, it was tall, sharp, and single cusped; it would have appeared very similar to a canine. The third premolar was double-rooted and compressed sideways. The fourth premolar is triple rooted with complete cingulum. The paracone is very large while the protocone, separated from the paracone by a deep ridge, is very small and positioned slightly forward of the paracone.

The first molar is triple-rooted, similar to the fourth premolar. However, it is different in that it is subrectangular, larger, and has a L/W ratio approaching 1. It has four main cusps. The protocone is the largest cusp, followed by the paracone and then the metacone. The second molar is similar in looks to the first molar, although it is much larger. The third molar is about the same size as the second although it is much less rectangular. It is roughly trapezoidal in shape, with the anterior portion of the tooth being the widest. The metacone is shifted lingually (tongue side). The protocone is larger than in the first molar.

=== Lower dentition ===
The second and third premolar are similar in morphology. Neither have a parastylid or a distosytlid. Cingulum is small but continuous, being most prominent in the front and aft sections of the teeth. The fourth premolar is the longest and widest of the premolars. There is no metaconid. There is a small but relatively deep talonid basin.

The size of molars increases dramatically and sequentially, with the first molar being the smallest. The cuspids are bunodont but high. The molars are double-rooted. The first molar is much longer than it is wide and trapezoidal, with its width increasing posteriorly. The metaconid is the highest cusp while the paraconid and protoconid are small. The second molar is similar, although it is larger and more rectangular and the trigonid basin is larger than the talonid basin. The third molar is similar to the second molar although it is larger and has more bulbous cusps. The metaconid is slightly more lingual than the entoconid and the protoconid is slightly more labial than the hypoconid. Similar to the second molar, the trigonid basin is larger than the talonid basin. Lingual cingulid is absent.

=== Dentary ===
The dentary is narrow anteriorly and slightly wider posteriorly. Mandibular symphysis stops only at the second premolar. There are two mental foramina under the first and third premolars respectively.

== Paleobiology ==
Due to the nature of its teeth, Rajouria was an average raoellid in terms of its diet. It would have most likely been primarily herbivorous, but opportunistically hunt small animals (like rodents). The caniniform second (and likely first) premolars indicate that Rajouria grasped and held onto prey with its front teeth, which is an adaptation for carnivory, but the last two premolars and the molars with somewhat prominent lophs point to a herbivorous lifestyle. Since Rajouria was a raoellid, it would have been semi-aquatic, similar to a chevrotain.

== See also ==
- Glossary of mammalian dental topography
- Evolution of cetaceans
- Cetacea
- Pakicetus
