= Kunmunella =

Kunmunella Temporal range: Ypresian, 50–48 Ma

Scientific classification
- Kingdom: Animalia
- Phylum: Chordata
- Class: Mammalia
- Order: Artiodactyla
- Family: †Raoellidae
- Genus: †Kunmunella; Sahni and Khare, 1971

Type species
- †Indohyus kalakotensis Ranga Rao, 1971

Species
- †K. kalakotensis Kumar and Sahni, 1985; †K. transversa Kumar and Sahni, 1985

Synonyms
- K. kalakotensis synonymy: †Kunmunella rajouriensis Sahni and Khare, 1972

Genus of extinct mammal from Eocene Epoch

Kunmunella is an extinct raoellid artiodactyl which inhabited what is now northern India during the middle-upper Eocene (Ypresian). There are two species of Kunmunella: K. kalakotensis and K. transversa. The former species was named after the town of Kalakote within Jammu and Kashmir, the place from which it was found, while the latter species was named after the transverse nature of the upper teeth. K. kalakotensis is known from a palate with its respective teeth, a left maxillary ramus, a left mandible, two poorly preserved maxillas, and two isolated molars. K. transversa is known from only a right maxilla.

== Discovery ==
The remains of Kunmunella were first found by Ranga Rao, 1971. He found only a left mandible, and assigned it to a new species of Indohyus, I. kalakotensis, after the region in which he discovered the animal. In the following year, an isolated upper third molar would be found by Sahni and Khare, which would be assigned to the new genus Kunmunella. This new taxon would be named K. rajouriensis, named after the Rajouri district where the fossil was found. In 1985, a right maxilla with its respective teeth was found and assigned to the new species K. transversa.

== Classification ==
=== External classification ===
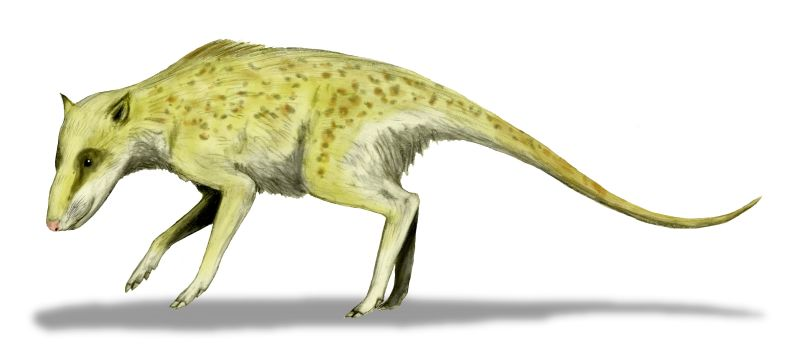
Drawing of Khirtharia major, originally thought to be Indohyus.

The first remains of Kunmunella discovered were first assigned to Indohyus. When Kunmunella was first named, it was assigned to Helohyidae, which was at that time within Dichobunidae, due to the morphology of its molar, which was at the time the only remains classified under the genus Kunmunella. In 1977, Kunmunella was moved from Dichobunidae to Helohyidae. In the same year, Helohyidae was moved from Dichobunoidea to Anthracotherioidea (now Ancodonta) and by extension Kunmunella was moved to Anthracotherioidea. In 1981, Kunmunella, along with Raoella (now Indohyus) and Khirtharia, were found to all share various synapomorphies and were grouped together in the new family Raoellidae. However, Thewissen et al. (1987) determined that Kunmunella, along with Raoella, were synonymous with Indohyus. This change was reverted by Thewissen, Williams & Hussain (2001), who found Kunmunella to be a valid genus. In 2011, Orliac and Ducrocq through a phylogenetic analysis determined Kunmunella to be the most basal raoellid. In 2020, a study found that Kunmunella was a junior synonym of Indohyus, although this result was not widely reconginzed. Rana and colleagues, in their description of the raoellid Rajouria, reaffirmed that Kunmunella was a valid genus because of a small metacone on the second molar.

=== Internal classification ===
The first species of Kunmunella to be named was K. rajouriensis, although the first remains of what is now known to be Kunmunella were found earlier and assigned to I. kalakotensis. In 1985, Kumar and Sahni found that I. kalakotensis was a synonym of K. rajouriensis and that Kunmunella was a distinct species. Since older names have precedent in taxonomy, they changed the name of K. rajouriensis to K. kalakotensis. The same study found that there was another species of Kunmunela, known only from a right maxilla: K. transversa. Rana et al. (2021) reaffirmed that the two species of Kunmunella were more closely related to each other than to any other animal, and therefore formed a valid genus.

== Description ==
Kunmunella has more transverse upper molars, a labially (towards the lips) shifted hypercone (a large cusp in the molars), a triangular third molar, and more prominent lingual (tongue side) enamel ridges. The third molar has a large conical paracone (a type of cusp) connected to a smaller metacone by an enamel ridge. The protocone is large and in the forward part of the molars while the hypocone, connected to the metacone by a ridge, is small. Labial cingulum (enamel ridges) are larger than posterior cingulum. Upper molars have bunolophodont cusps, the paracone is the largest cusp, and the mesocone is absent, while the premolars are non-molarized.

=== K. kalakotensis ===
==== Upper dentition ====
Kunmunella kalakotensis has canines separated from premolars by a small space. The first premolar is very similar to the canines; it is single cusped (only has one, large bump) and is sharp. The second premolar is larger than the first and elongated but lingo-lingually compressed. There are two large ridges which descend from the highpoint of the tooth. The third molar is the largest. It has a posterior ridge which splits into two near the top of the tooth. It has transverse upper molars with conical cusps and large lophs. Cingula are prominent and present throughout the entirety of the molar. K. kalakotensis also has an anterior ridge which is undivided. The lingual enamel ridges are larger than the labial ridges. The fourth premolar is similar to the previous teeth. The paracone is large and nearly twice the height of the protocone. The first molar is rectangular and wider than it is long. The paracone is the largest and tallest cusp. There are grooves of varying deepness between the four large cusps. The occlusal surface of the enamel is smooth, although the sides of the tooth are rugose. The cingulum are prominent throughout the entire tooth. The second molar is larger with more prominent cusps than the first molar. There is no metaconule on the second molar. The third molar is triangular. The paracone is high and conical, while the hypocone is reduced. Similar to the second molar, the cingulum are prominent.

==== Lower dentition ====
Kunmunella kalakotensis has lower dentition known only by the last two molars. The third molar is labio-lingualy compressed, similar to the second premolar of the upper dentition. The metaconid is the largest cusp, while the entoconid is the smallest and the paraconid is absent. There are ridges connecting the cusps. Anterior and lingual cingula are well developed.

=== K. transversa ===
The fourth premolar is high, transverse, and almost the same size as the first molar. As opposed to K. kalakotensis which has elongated paracone, K. transversa has a conical paracone. The first molar is rectangular and wider than it is long. It has a larger hypocone than the first molar in K. kalakotensis. There is no metacone and cingula are prominent. The second molar is transverse. The protocone is displaced towards the lingual side of the tooth. The third molar is rectangular (unlike the triangular molar in K. kalakotensis) and has a paracone displaced lingually. The posterior cingululm of the third molar forms a shelf-like structure.

== Paleobiology ==
Being a raoellid, Kunmunella likely had a similar lifestyle to Indohyus. Kunmunella was likely an omnivore because related genus Indohyus had teeth that allowed it to grasp and hold prey, while also having molars adapted to processing plant matter. Kunmunella and other raoellids were almost certainly semiaquatic. This is due to higher bone density than fully terrestrial mammals and auditory bulla, both of which were found in Indohyus.
