= Metkatius =

Metkatius Temporal range: Eocene (Lutetian) 48–45 Ma

Scientific classification
- Kingdom: Animalia
- Phylum: Chordata
- Class: Mammalia
- Infraclass: Placentalia
- Order: Artiodactyla
- Family: †Raoellidae
- Genus: †Metkatius; Kumar and Sahni, 1985

Species
- †M. kashmiriensis; †M. babbiangalensis

Genus of extinct artiodactyl from the Middle Eocene

Metkatius, named after the town of Metka in the province Jammu and Kashmir, is a small extinct raoellid artiodactyl which inhabited northern India during the Middle Eocene (48-45 Mya) during the Early Lutetian age. Metkatius is known from fragmentary remains, with the only discovered fossil remains being mandibular and maxillary fragments and isolated teeth, mainly belonging to juvenile specimens and a portion of the skeleton of a juvenile, a fragmentary skull, vertabrae, and a forelimb. There are two species of Metkatius, M. kashmiriensis and M. babbiangalensis, the former of which is named after Kashmir while the latter is named after the local word "Babbian" meaning hill and "Gala" meaning depression between two hills.

== Discovery ==
M. kashmiriensis was described by Kumar and Sahni in 1985. The holotype specimen VPL/K 562 consists of an anterior portion of the skeleton of a juvenile, a fragmentary and warped skull, six vertabrae (the seventh was presumably destroyed during fossilization), and a forelimb. The holotype specimen was found in Grey sandstone in the Upper Subathu formation.

M. babbiangalensis was described in 2020 by Rajendra Rana and Waqas Mirza. The holotype specimen consists of a ramus with the first molar preserved, second molar missing, and third molar partially preserved. All other specimens of M. babbiangalensis are either mandibular or maxillary fragments.

== Description ==
Metkatius is a small raoellid that lived during the early Lutetian age. Metkatius is distinguished from other raoellids, like Indohyus, primarily by its small size and bunodont molars with 27 moderately marked transverse lophs. Metkatius is approximately 40% smaller than the related genus Indohyus. The first and second molars are significantly longer than they are wide with a small paraconid and a mesial mesiostylid. The first premolar bears a distally reduced hypoconid.

=== Skull ===
The skull of Metkatius is 8.5 cm (3.3 inches) long and 4.5 cm (1.8 inches) tall. The orbit is 1.4 cm (0.6 inches) tall and 0.8 cm (0.3 inches) wide. The ramus is 1.5 cm (0.6 inches) deep.

=== Teeth ===
In the first molar, two ridges descend from the highest point of the protoconid, a major cusp at the labial apex of the trigonid region, with one going forwards and the other going backwards. The anterior (forward) ridge splits in two near the top of the tooth. The inner ridge become sharpe and vertically oriented. The outward facing ridge is relatively minor. A shelf-like structure developed between the inner and outer ridge. Anterior and posterior cingula (raised protrusions) do not extend very high, with the posterior cingulum being larger. The second lower molar has a length to width ratio of 1.85. The tooth narrows anteriorly because the trigonid (molar) cusps are situated close to each other. The protoconid is large and taller than the metaconid. The large hypoconid is connected to the entoconid by a ridge. The talonid basin is wider than the trigonid. Labial and lingual cingula are most likely absent, although they could have been removed during fossilization. The posterior cingulum is well marked and raised. On the forward side of the tooth, a structure resembling a cingulum developed with wear. The third molar is 40% longer than the second molar, with a length to width ratio of 2. The talonid cusps are similar too those of the second molar except for the presence of a small hypoconulid. The disposition of the hypoconulid separates Metkatius from other raoellids because of its separation (instead of linkage to) the talonid cusps by a valley and by being taller than the talonid cusps. A small tubercle develposed at the base of the protoconid where the ectolophid ends. Lingual and posterior cingula are absent.

=== Cervical vertebrae ===
Six cervical vertebrae are clearly visible while the seventh was most likely damaged during the fossilization process. The vertebrae were interlocking. The average length of each vertebra is approximately 1.2 cm (0.5 inches). The transverse processes were small and broad.

=== Thoracic vertebrae ===
Five thoracic vertebrae were preserved, with all of them being connected to mostly intact ribs. The thoracic vertabrae were roughly 0.9 cm (0.4 inches) long and the ribs were roughly 0.4 cm (0.2 inches) wide.

=== Forelimbs and girdle ===
Behind the fourth thoracic vertebra, pectoral girdle elements are present. The proximal end of a forelimb, most likely a humerus, was preserved. The diameter of the proximal extremity of the bone was 1.9 cm (0.7 inches) while the preserved portion of the main portion of the bone is 0.8 cm (0.3 inches). Reconstructed, the bone was approximately 6.5 cm (2.6 inches) long. Due to the lack of fused epiphyses, the specimen was most likely a juvenile or subadult.

== Paleobiology ==
Being a raoellid, Metkatius likely had a similar lifestyle to Indohyus. Metkatius was likely an omnivore because related genus Indohyus had teeth that allowed it to grasp and hold prey, while also having molars adapted to processing plant matter. Metkatius and other raoellids were almost certainly semiaquatic. This is due to higher bone density than fully terrestrial mammals and auditory bulla, both of which were found in Indohyus.

== See also ==
- Cetacea
- Pakicetus
