= Lesser Himalayan Strata =

Major depositional strata in the Himalaya

One of the major depositional strata in the Himalaya is the Lesser Himalayan Strata from the Paleozoic to Mesozoic eras. It had a quite different marine succession during the Paleozoic, as most parts of it are sparsely fossiliferous or even devoid of any well-defined fossils. Moreover, it consists of many varied lithofacies, making correlation work more difficult. This article describes the major formations of the Paleozoic – Mesozoic Lesser Himalayan Strata, including the Tal Formation, Gondwana Strata, Singtali Formation and Subathu Formation.

== Geological background ==
The Himalayan mountain chain is a fold and thrust belt that can be divided into four units bounded by thrusts from south to north: the Sub-Himalaya, Lesser Himalaya, Greater Himalaya and Tethyan Himalaya. The Lesser Himalayan Zone has a lower relief and elevation of the mountains compared to Greater Himalaya. The Lesser Himalaya Sequence (LHS) is bounded by two main thrusts: the Main Central Thrust (MCT) in the north and the Main Boundary Thrust (MBT) in the south.

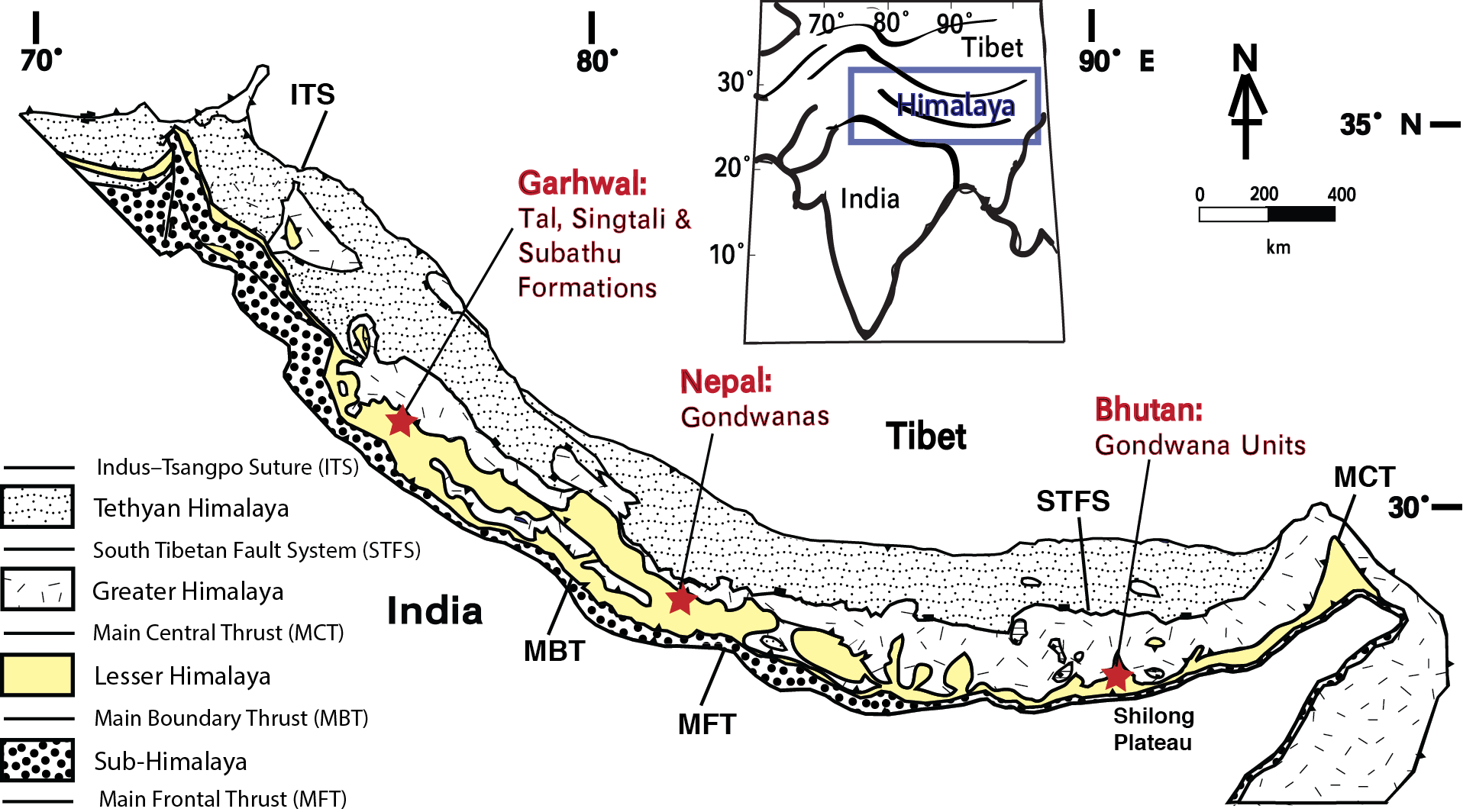
Geographic locations of major formations discussed. Modified from N.R. McKenzie et al. (2011).

The main layers of the LHS includes non-fossiliferous, low-grade, metasedimentary rocks, metavolcanic strata and augen gneiss. These have been dated as an age ranging from 1870 Ma to 520 Ma (i.e. Proterozoic to Cambrian). Near the end of the Early Cambrian, there was a regional diastrophism (i.e. deformation of the Earth's crust) or crustal movement that heaved up the Indian subcontinent, interrupting the sedimentation in the Lesser Himalaya and causing a widespread unconformity in Nepal. This is known as the Great Lesser Himalayan Unconformity, which separates the older LHS from the overlying younger LHS that has an age of Permian to Middle Eocene.

During the Paleozoic and Mesozoic, the LHS starts from the basal Tal Formation, which is part of the Outer Lesser Himalayan sequence in the Garhwal Himalaya. The Tal was deposited between the period of the Late Proterozoic to Palaeozoic Cambrian. After that, there was a great hiatus between the Middle Proterozoic rocks and the overlying Palaeocene-Eocene strata. This indicates that the LHS experienced a long period of denudation or non-deposition in the Western Himalaya (e.g. in the Jumla area), resulting in missing Gondwana Strata in Jumla during the Mesozoic (see more in the table of "Gondwana Strata of LHS in Western and Central Nepal"). In the Central and Eastern Himalaya, Gondwana strata from the Permian to Paleocene were preserved unconformably onto the older LHS. The next succession of the LHS in the Garhwal Himalaya comes to the Singtali Formation, which was deposited from the Late Cretaceous to Palaeocene, followed by the Subathu Formation, which was deposited from the Late Palaeocene to Middle Eocene, marking the start of Cenozoic Era.

Table showing the major formations discussed in the following sections:

LESSER HIMALAYAN SEQUENCE
| | Western Himalaya | Central Himalaya | | Eastern Himalaya |
|---|---|---|---|---|
| | Garhwal Himalaya | Western Nepal | Central Nepal | Bhutan |
| Sirmur Group | Subathu Formation (Late Paleocene – Middle Eocene) | Tertiary Units (Bhainskati Formation) | | Gondwana Units (Late Carboniferous – Permian) |
| Sirmur Group | Singtali Formation (Late Cretaceous – Paleocene) | Gondwanas (Jurassic – Paleocene) | Tansen Group - Upper and Lower Gondwanas (Late Permo-Carboniferous – Paleocene) | Gondwana Units (Late Carboniferous – Permian) |
| Lacking Gondwana Units (Hiatus) | | Gondwanas (Jurassic – Paleocene) | Tansen Group - Upper and Lower Gondwanas (Late Permo-Carboniferous – Paleocene) | Gondwana Units (Late Carboniferous – Permian) |
| Mussoorie Group | Tal Formation (Cambrian) | Gondwanas (Jurassic – Paleocene) | Tansen Group - Upper and Lower Gondwanas (Late Permo-Carboniferous – Paleocene) | Gondwana Units (Late Carboniferous – Permian) |
| Mussoorie Group | Krol Formation | ~~~~~~~~Great Lesser Himalayan Unconformity~~~~~~~ | | Baxa Group |
| Mussoorie Group | Blaini Formation | Nawakot Unit | | Daling-Shumar Group |

== Tal Formation ==
The Tal Formation belongs to the Mussoorie Group of Outer Lesser Himalaya of Garhwal in northwestern India. It is well exposed along the Krol Belt, and is overlying the Precambrian Krol Group.

The Tal in the Mussoorie Synform can be divided into the Lower Tal and Upper Tal. For the Lower Tal, there are four subdivisions: the Chert, Argillaceous, Arenaceous and Calcareous Units. The basal black shale succession with sandy limestone represents a depositional environment of a protected lagoon or embayment, while the overlying siltstone is deposited in a mud flat of an intertidal zone.

The Upper Tal can be subdivided into lower quartzitic sequence and upper thick calcareous sequence containing abundant fragmentary shells of bivalves, gastropods, bryozoa, etc. The Phulchatti quartzite succession represents the deposits of a shoal environment, while the uppermost shell limestone sequence indicates an increasing energy of the shallow tidal sea, and a marine transgression in the Cretaceous.

There is an increase of energy for deposition from the Lower Tal to the Upper Tal. Because of the lack of well-defined body fossils in the Tal, it has been proposed that the deposits of the Tal were formed in the Late Precambrian near Precambrian-Cambrian transition, except for the uppermost Manikot Shell Limestone, which has been proposed to have been formed in the Late Cretaceous and unconformably overlain by the Subathu Formation in the Tal Valley, Garhwal Himayala.

The details of lithologies and depositional environment of Tal Formation are shown in the table below:

| Formation | Lithologies | Depositional Environment |
|---|---|---|
| Upper Tal | Manikot Shell Limestone – Grey, oolitic, sandy, current-bedded fossiliferous limestone containing fragmentary bivalves, gastropod and quartzite | High-energy shallow tidal sea |
| Upper Tal | ------------------------locally unconformable------------------------ | |
| Upper Tal | Phulchatti Quartzite – White to purplish, felspathic, fine-grained to gritty, current-bedded, locally conglomeratic | Shoal |
| Lower Tal | Calcareous Unit – Ferruginous, sandy limestone or calcareous quartzite (locally developed) | Shoal |
| Lower Tal | Arenaceous Unit – Siltstone, micaceous, grey to dark grey | Mixed flat and mud flat of intertidal zone |
| Lower Tal | Argillaceous Unit – Shale, micaceous, grey to dark grey, locally carbonaceous with calcareous pyritous nodules | Protected lagoon or embayment |
| Lower Tal | Chert Unit – Chert, black with intercalation of black shale, phosphate beds and nodules (locally developed) | Protected lagoon or embayment |

== Gondwana strata ==
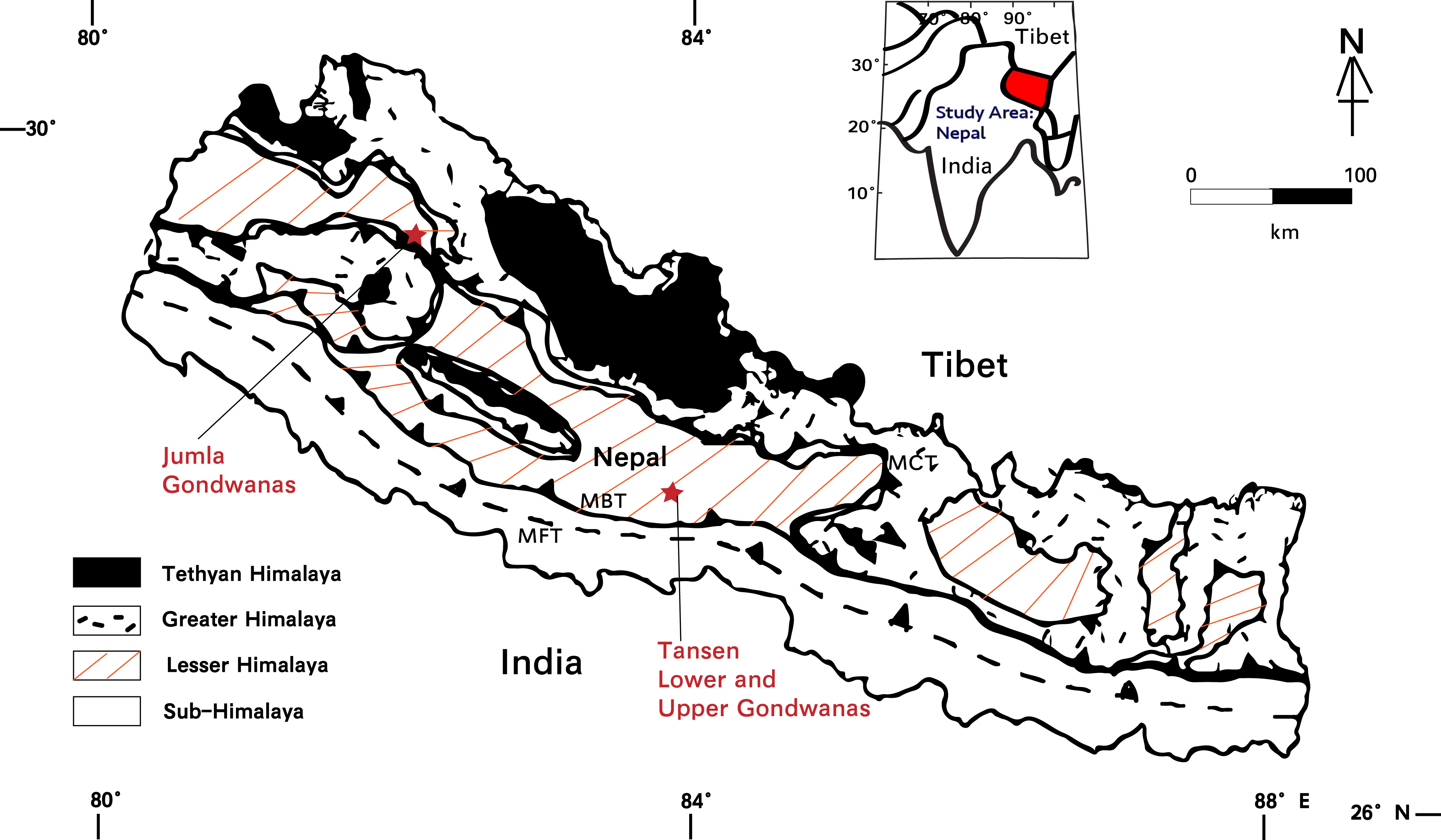
Geography of Gondwana Units in Western and Central Nepal

Gondwana strata are not exposed in the Garhwal Himalaya after the Tal Formation owing to the great hiatus; some outcrops can be found in Central and Eastern Himalaya during Late Paleozoic to Mesozoic times.

=== Central Himalaya – Central and Western Nepal ===
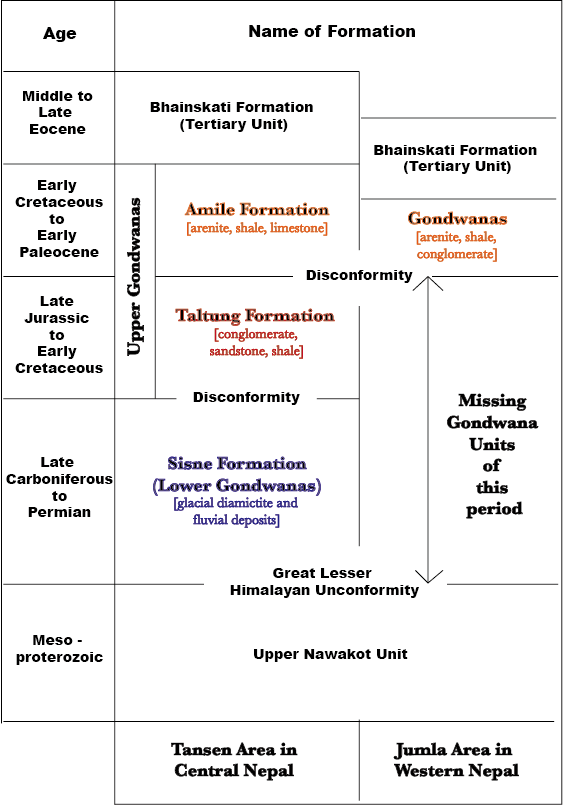
Gondwana Strata of LHS in Western and Central Nepal

In Nepal, the older LHS with age ranging from the Paleoproterozoic to uppermost Precambrian are separated from the younger LHS by the Great Lesser Himalayan Unconformity. Missing Early Proterozoic strata of the LHS suggest that the rocks may have been eroded before the deposition of the Gondwana strata. Younger continental facies Gondwana strata were first deposited after the unconformity. They are then unconformably overlain by a marine facies Tertiary Unit. The Gondwana strata are mainly developed within two zones in Nepal in the central Himalaya. The first is in central Nepal, where several outcrops of the Tansen Group can be found. The second is in western Nepal, where the Gondwana strata are exposed in the Jumla–Humla basins near the Tethyan Himalaya.

The Tansen area contains Gondwana sediments that are identified by the presence of fossils. Two major formation can be found there. They are older Sisne Formation (or the Lower Gondwanas) and younger Taltung and Amile formations (or the Upper Gondwanas). The Sisne Formation is dominated by glacial diamictite and fluvial deposits. In the upper part of the formation, shales are found to contain fenstellid bryozoan fossils, indicating that the Lower Gondwanas in central Nepal dates from the Late Carboniferous to the Permian.

The Upper Gondwanas are further subdivided into the Taltung and Amile formations. The Taltung Formation is characterised by coarse-grained, volcaniclastic conglomerates, sandstones and silty shales. They were deposited by northwestward-flowing fluvial channels. Abundant plant fossils are found in the Taltung Formation, and they are dated to the Late Jurassic to the Early Cretaceous. The Amile Formation is unconformably overlying the Taltung Formation. It is dominated by white quartz arenites, quartz pebble sandstones, carbonaceous shales and limestones with coral, mollusc and vertebrate fossils. In the upper part of the formation, an abrupt change of lithology from thick, coarse-grained quartzose sandstones to interbedded layers of black marine shales and fine-grained quartzose sandstones are observed. This is probably the contact between the Upper Amile Formation and the overlying Bhainskati Formation of the Tertiary Unit. The Amile Formation is dated to the Early Cretaceous to Early Paleocene, while the Bhainskati Formation is biostratigraphically dated as from the Middle to Late Eocene.

In the Jumla area of western Nepal, Gondwana strata unconformably overly the caronbate rocks of the Uppermost Nawakot Unit of Mesoproterozoic age. The Gondwanas here are characterized by quartzose sandstones, black shales, quartz pebble conglomerates as well as coal and lignite. They are dated as Jurassic to Paleocene. The lithology of Gondwanas here is quite similar to that of the Amile Formation in central Nepal. Also, the Gondwana Unit is overlain by the Bhainskati Formation of the Tertiary Unit, similar to the situation in central Nepal.

However, in fact, the Gondwana Unit is not very well developed in the Jumla area. The strata with lithology similar to that of the Taltung Formation and Lower Gondwanas are missing here. In other words, the LHS in the Jumla area is lacking a part of the Gondwana Unit of age ranging from Late Carboniferous-Permian to Early Cretaceous. This is probably due to a greater effect by the Great Lesser Himalayan Unconformity in the Jumla area than in the Tansen area.

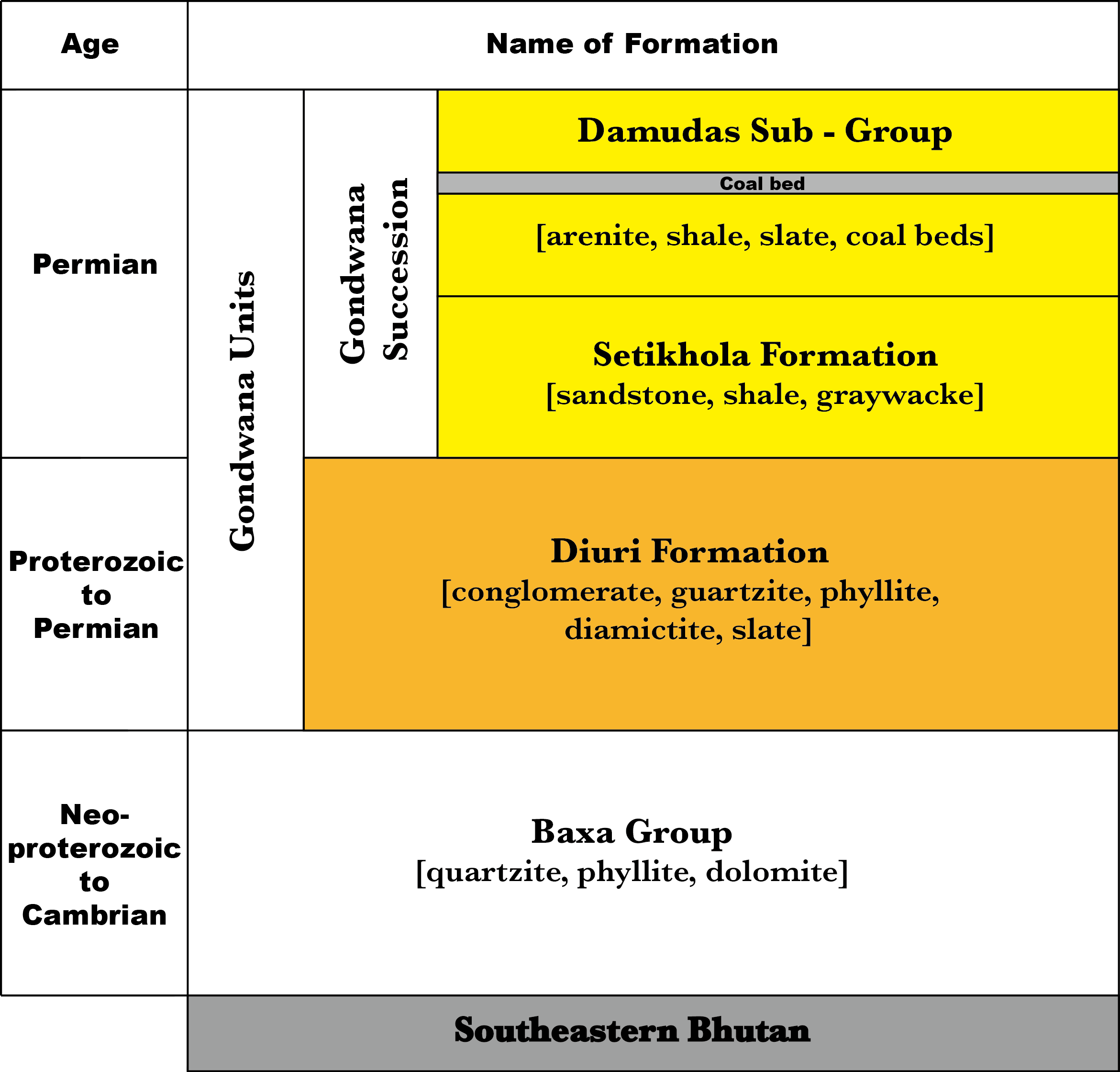
Gondwana Units of the LHS in Southeastern Bhutan

=== Eastern Himalaya – Bhutan ===
Compared with Nepal, the Gondwana strata are exposed in a relatively smaller area in Bhutan. In southeastern Bhutan, the basal LHS begins with the metamorphic Daling-Shumar Group, followed by the Baxa Group that is characterized by quartzite, phyllite and dolomite succession of Neoproterozoic to probably Cambrian age. The bottom of the Gondwana Units (Diuri Formation) is then directly overlying the Baxa Group.

Generally, there are three main formations of Gondwana Units exposed in southeastern Bhutan. The bottom one is the Diuri Formation with Proterozoic to Permian ages. It consists of conglomerate, quartzite, phyllite as well as diamictite with interbedded slates. At the base of this formation, pebbles are composed of quartzite and siliceous dolomite. They are embedded in a fine quartzite matrix. The thicker beds of slate and phyllite are overlying the conglomerate layers. Clear schistosity can be observed. The diamictite found implies a source of glacial origin. It is probably correlated to the glaciation event of the Gondwana supercontinent during the Late Paleozoic.

The Diuri Formation is then overlain by the Setikhola Formation, which is characterized by feldspathic sandstone, shale, graywacke, coal lenses and plant fossils. One sequence consists of interbedding of sandstone and shale and is intensely bioturbated with flames structures observed as well. This indicates a depositional environment of beach or mudflat. Also, another sequence of interbedding calcareous greywacke and carbonaceous shale is found. Ripples and cross-laminae can be observed on the greywacke, while small-scaled sun cracks and slump folds can be seen on shale. It is proposed that this sequence has a depositional environment of semi-isolated basin. The marine fossils contained here indicate a Permian age of the Setikhola Formation.

The uppermost Gondwana unit is the Damudas Sub-Group, which is characterized by arenite, shale, slate and black coal beds. In fact, the Setikhola Formation and Damudas Sub-Group are together termed as the Gondwana succession. The bedrock of the Damudas Sub-Group is made up of gritty, micaceous and cross-laminated sandstones. These friable sandstone layers are interbedded with coal beds that have been sheared and crushed. Abundant plant fossils like fern leaves can be found on the carbonaceous shale, characterising the Damuda coalfields and indicating a Permian age. Generally, the strata here are lenticular and display a fining-upwards sequence. In tectonic context, it is proposed that the Gondwana strata here have experienced post—Gondwana orogenic movements, resulting in folded rocks followed by overturned beddings.

== Singtali and Subathu formations ==
Following a sedimentary break or unconformity, the Singtali and Subathu formations were deposited as foreland basin sediments in the Garhwal Outer Lesser Himalaya during the Late Cretaceous to Middle Palaeocene. Both formations can be found overlying the Tal Formation in an extremely complex structural setting including isoclinal overturned folding and multiple thrusting events. In addition, with the similarities of the lithology as well as depositional environment, it is sometimes quite difficult to distinguish between the Singtali and Subathu Formations. The main difference discussed in the following is related to the tectonic events during their deposition.

=== Singtali Formation ===
The Singtali Formation belongs to the Sirmur Group of the Outer Lesser Himalaya of Garhwal. It is also called "Upper Tal" as the uppermost Manikot Shell Limestone, however, this formation is distinct from the basement Tal Formation upon which it rests unconformably. Its main lithology is dominated by sandy, oolitic and shelly limestones with subordinate quartz arenites. Medium-bedded massive strata are predominant and no sedimentary structures are visible. The Singtali Formation has been assigned as a Late Cretaceous-Palaeocene age based on faunal evidence. In terms of depositional environment, the dominance of limestone in the Singtali Formation and sparse fauna would imply shallow marine conditions at that time. A high-energy, agitated environment can be inferred from the presence of ooids.

=== Subathu Formation or Group ===
The Subathu Formation also belongs to the Sirmur Group of the Outer Lesser Himalaya of Garhwal. In 2020 literature it is referred to as Subathu Group. It is a sequence of limestones, green mudrocks and subordinate sandstones, and has been paleontologically dated as from Late Palaeocene to Middle Eocene. The rocks are rich in fossils. The limestones with normal marine fauna and thick mudstones with well preserved, burrowing-type molluscs indicate a quiet, relatively shallow shelf environment during the period of deposition. This depositional environment is similar to that of the Singtali Formation. The Subathu contains the oldest Himalayan foreland basin rocks. Near the Krol and Garhwal thrusts in northeastern India, the Subathu Formation exists as a narrow and discontinuous strip, indicating that it has experienced extremely high tectonic shearing and shattering as a result of overthrusting of rocks. Consequently, the Subathu Formation is only partially preserved in the Krol nappe and under the Garhwal thrust, and unconformably overlies the Tal Formation.

=== Distinctions between the Singtali and Subathu Formations ===
In the Singtali Formation times (Late Cretaceous-Palaeocene), the Indian craton submerged and stable shallow marine conditions ensued. This event is possibly related to flexure, such that the Spontang ophiolite was obducted onto the Northern Indian Plate margin. One more possible explanation is related to extensional tectonics, such that India has drifted and detached from Gondwana, and northwards subduction of the Neotethys (Tethys Ocean) beneath Asia occurred. Therefore, the Singtali Formation has been interpreted as pre-collisional transgressive sediments, at the same time there was a global eustatic sea level rise during the Late Cretaceous.

The tectonic setting of the Subathu Formation is different from that of the Singtali Formation. It was deposited during the suturing of India and Eurasia, between the initial and terminal continental collision. The inferred pattern of northward shallowing and reduced sedimentation conflicts with classic foreland basin models. However, these depositional patterns may reflect basement fault reactivation, giving rise to paleohighs, rather than simply crustal loading following on from the collision.

Their individual tectonic significance related to foreland basin evolution are discussed in greater detail in the next section. The general similarities and differences between the Singtali and Subathu formations are shown in the table below:

| Formation | Period | Lithologies | Depositional environment | Tectonic event(s) |
|---|---|---|---|---|
| Subathu | Late Palaeocene – Middle Eocene | Limestone, shale, green mudrock | Shallow marine environment | Indian-Eurasia continental collision |
| Singtali | Late Cretaceous – Palaeocene | Limestone, sandstone | Shallow marine environment | Obduction of Spontang ophiolite onto the Northern Indian plate margin; Neotethyan subduction beneath Asia; Continued northward drift of India after detachment from Gondwana |

== Geological significance during Paleozoic to Mesozoic times ==
=== Gondwana strata ===
In the Nepal Himalaya, the Lower Gondwana glacial diamictite is unconformably overlain by the fluvial Taltung Formation (Upper Gondwana), which contains abundant plant fossils distributed widely within the Tansen area. Alkali basalt lava flows are interbedded with the fluvial beds in the Lower Taltung. Gravelly braided river facies are shown in the Lower Taltung while silty meandering river facies are displayed in the Upper Taltung, as a result, the sequence is fining upwards. The strata were deposited in a terrestrial basin on Gondwana.

Because of the appearance of glacial diamictite and index plant fossils found in the Lower and Upper Gondwanas respectively, it has been proposed that the Lesser Himalaya had been a part of Gondwanaland during the Permian to Cretaceous. Later on, the presence of basaltic lava flows indicate a tectonic setting related to basaltic volcanism as the volcanic clasts were derived from the underlying lava and transported by rivers from Gondwana land. The interbedding layers of fluvial sediments and basaltic lava bands imply that there was repeated occurrence of basaltic eruption and erosion and sedimentation of fluvial deposits alternatively. These events were probably caused by breaking up and rifting of Gondwanaland during the Late Jurassic to Early Cretaceous.

The whole sequence of Upper Gondwanas (including both the Taltung and Amile Formations) represents non-marine deposition. Data from the paleocurrent direction show that the sediments were derived from the south, because the Indian subcontinent was drifting northwards towards the Lesser Himalaya. After that, the Bhainskati Formation was deposited in shallow marine environment. The upper Bhainskati has been found to have been deposited in a brackish or fresh water environment, indicating a gradual and minor regression period. The regression phase was probably initiated by the sea level change in the northern Neotethys. However, overall there were no significant changes in tectonic setting during the Early Cretaceous to Early Paleocene. In fact, the Bhainskati Formation is correlated to the Subathu Formation in the Garhwal Himalaya. The deposition of these marine facies in a shallow marine environment is associated with the foreland basin development.

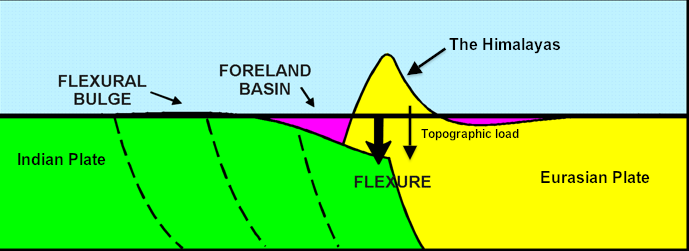
Downward displacement and flexure of the Indian Plate as a result of obduction of ophiolites onto the Indian Plate.

=== Tectonic events related to Singtali Formation ===
The Early Tertiary geology of the Indian Lesser Himalaya conforms well with the classic foreland basin model. In Late Cretaceous times, this area of the northern region of the Indian Plate finally became submerged after a long period when sub-aerial conditions had dominated. This resulted in deposition of the marine Singtali Formation. A possible explanation for this event is that ophiolites such as the Spontang ophiolite were obducted onto the Indian Plate Zanskar continental shelf in the Campanian or Maastrichtian, resulting in downward displacement and flexure of the Indian Plate hundreds of kilometres to the south. Moreover, it has been proposed that the marine transgression is related to extensional tectonic setting, such that the Late Albian has detached from India and has started to drift from the Gondwana supercontinent, Also, the Neotethys has subducted northwards beneath Asia. This event is accompanied with the Late Cretaceous global eustatic sea-level high stand as well.

=== Tectonic events related to Subathu Formation ===
The initial contact between India and Eurasia have taken place at 62 – 60 Ma in the northwestern Himalayas, with terminal collision culminating by 55 Ma in the east. The Subathu Formation rocks were deposited during the suturing and initial collision of India and Eurasia.

However, the western intermediate structural level localities show a much thinner Subathu marine sequence compared to the eastern intermediate structural level localities and the lowest structural level. The thickness variations between the west and the east could be explained by the progressive suturing of India and Eurasia from northwest to east, with later suturing in the east allowing a longer period where marine conditions could predominate.

This progressive suturing, however, would not explain the thickness difference between the lowest and intermediate structural levels. As the intermediate structural level restores further to the north than the lower structural level, northward shallowing of the basin (i.e. towards the load) is implied. This is different from the theoretical model, where the depocentre is close to the load and shallows towards the craton. In the Lesser Himalayan early foreland basin, palaeohighs, which are resulted from basement fault reactivation, may have been located in the west between the load to the north and the marine Subathu basin to the south. This would result in shallowing towards, and reduced sedimentation on the palaeohigh, which coupled with the probable distal nature of the basin, therefore, explaining the thin sequences of the western intermediate structural level localities.

After suturing, fluvial facies are overlying the marine Subathu Formation. It is associated with the uplift of Himalaya and regression of sea in the Late Eocene.

== See also ==
- Geology of the Himalaya
- Geology of Nepal
- Himalayan foreland basin
