= Kuldana Formation =

Geological formation in Pakistan

- Stratigraphic range: Lutetian
- Type: Geological formation
- Unit of: Subathu Group
- Underlies: Kohat Formation
- Overlies: Ghazij, Shekhan & Chorgali Formations

Location
- Location: Gilgit-Baltistan and Punjab, Pakistan
- Coordinates: 33°43′N 72°10′E
- Approximate paleocoordinates: 14.3°N 68.7°E
- Region: Kala Chitta Range
- Country: Pakistan

Type section
- Named for: Kuldana Village, Hazara District
- Named by: Latif
- Year defined: 1970
- Kuldana Formation (Pakistan)

The Kuldana Formation is a fossil-bearing geological formation of Lutetian (Early Eocene) age which crops out in northern Pakistan. The abundant fossil remains were deposited by rivers and estuaries crossing an arid to semi-arid environment, between several marine transgressions. Its fossil fauna is best known for the early cetaceans Indohyus, Pakicetus and Ambulocetus, that helped to shed a new light on the evolution of whales, but it also features a large number of early ungulates, rodents and primates.

== History ==
Fossils from the Kuldana Formation have been studied since long before the name was established, with some of the earliest papers being those of Pilgrim, published in 1940. At that point in time, the sediments were known as the Chharat beds. The name Kuldana Formation as such was first coined by Mir Abdul Latif in 1970, prior to which the sediments had already been known as the Kuldana Beds and Kuldana Series, deriving its name from a nearby village. Around the same time, Meissner and colleagues studied similar outcrops near the village of Mami Khel, 200 km (120 mi) southwest of Kuldana, naming it the Mami Khel Clay. Although study began prior to the publication of Latif's work, this paper was not published until later. Several subsequent papers comparing the two generally agreed that they were synonyms and represented a single geological formation, that being the Kuldana Formation. A 1996 publication by Pivnik and Wells meanwhile used the name Mami Khel Formation and Maas et al. (2001) treated the two as distinct formations primarily based on their geographic separation through the Indus River while providing no other indicators in how the two differed. Other studies treating the two formations as distinct include Leinders (1999) and Thewissen (2001).

== Geography ==
Outcrops of the Kuldana Formation are found in the form of isoclinal folds across northern Pakistan's Kohat plateau and Potwar plateau. The Formation stretches from Barbora and Mami Khel at the western edge of the Kohat plateau to the name-giving locality of Kuldana at the eastern end of the Potwar plateau. Between these points are a variety of other localities as well, such as Chorlakki, located within the eastern-most Kohat plateau, as well as Lammidhan and Ganda Kas (Kala Chitta) at the western end of the Potwar plateau.

== Stratigraphy ==
While the stratigraphy within the Kuldana Formation is poorly understood, its relation to under- and overlying formations has been much better studied thanks to the succession being consistently visible across various localities. At Banda Daud Shah, the Kuldana Formation overlies the Ghazij Formation, the Shekhan Formation and the Jatta Gypsum. The Ghazij and Shekhan Formations also underlie the Kuldana Formation at Chrolakki while at Ganda Kas and Gali Jhagir the formation preceding the Kuldana was the Chorgali Formation. The Kohat Formation consistently overlies the Kuldana Formation.

== Age ==
The age of the Kuldana Formation has been subject to repeated revision and multiple back and forths among researchers. Two early estimates, proposed by Cotter and Pilgrim respectively, suggested that the Kuldana Formation was either Ypresian (Early Eocene) or Lutetian (early Middle Eocene) in age, with subsequent authors generally following one of these hypothesis. After officially establishing the name Kuldana Formation, Latif suggested that the formation dates to the lower to middle Eocene on the basis of shallow benthic foramins, somewhat straddling the line between both the results of Cotter and Pilgrim. This would come to be the general result of subsequent papers as well, which often recovered an age within that general range.

In 1983 Gingerich used the fact that the Kuldana Formation is preceded and followed by marine strata to compare it with then available maps of sea levels during the Eocene, arguing for a late Early Eocene age, once again falling into the convention established by prior work. Gingerich did however come to revise his 1983 age estimate in a paper published in 2003 that dealt with the stratigraphy observed across different localities in order to obtain a more reliable result. Another aim of this work was to provide counter arguments to some claims made around the turn of the century, when several papers claimed that the sediments at Mami Khel represented a distinct formation that dated to the early Early Eocene. To do so, foramins of underlying formations were used to establish a maximum age for the Kuldana strata. At Banda Daud Shah, Gingerich recovered a late Early Eocene to early Middle Eocene (P9 or P10) age based on the planktonic foraminifera of the underlying Shekhan Formation, with similar results being recovered based on shallow benthic foramins at Chorlakki, Ganda Kas and Gali Jhagir (all dated to SB12 to SB13). Gingerich further utilizes updated knowledge on global sea levels to find similar results. Unlike in 1983, Gingerich now recognized two distinct periods of low sea levels, one during the late Early Eocene and a second, longer-lasting period during the early Middle Eocene. Gingerich argues that, since only one terrestrial phase is observed within the stratigraphy of Eocene Pakistan, it is likely that the Kuldana Formation represents the longer period of low sea levels, placing it within the early Late Eocene.

== Paleoenvironment ==
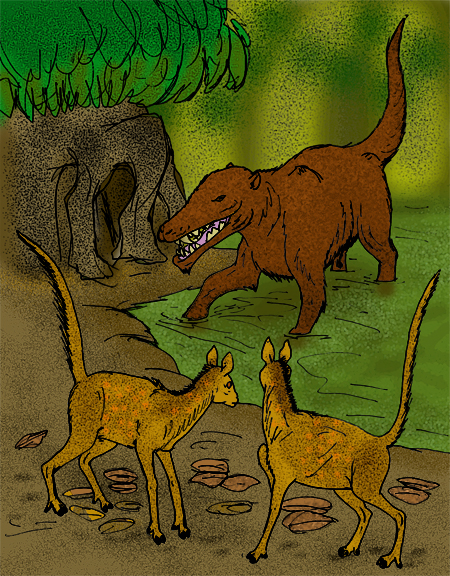
Life reconstructions of Pakicetus inachus and Gujaratia pakistanensis.

The Kuldana Formation featured several different environments across its time of deposition, with the oldest layers showing fluvial conditions. The strata overlying these sediments suggest that the environment shifted to a mix of freshwater and shallow marine habitats, which is supported by multiple lines of evidence. Evidence for freshwater biomes is present through isotopic analysis as well as the local fauna, for example the freshwater snail Planorbis, whereas the presence of sharks and pycnodontoid fish shows the presence of marine habitats. It is thought that the archaeocetes that inhabited the formation at the time stuck to freshwater biomes, even if some localities were evidently closer to the coast.

This mix of fresh- and saltwater habitats was eventually followed by a marine transgression that characterizes the geology of the uppermost layers of the formation.

=== Ganda Kas ===
Fossiliferous sediments in and around the Ganda Kas localities were deposited in semi-arid Eocene floodplains and freshwater channels. The H-GSP Locality 62, from which an abundance of material is known, was deposited in a stillwater environment, while other localities in the area represent the remains of prehistoric rivers. Localities around Ganda Kas deposited in a marine environment appears to be of a later age.

=== Banda Daud Shah ===
Like in Ganda Kas, the depositional environment in the areas presenting a Banda Daud Shah-type fauna, such as the eponymous Banda Daud Shah and Barbora Banda localities, represents an arid environment crossed by various rivers. The most common fossil mammals are the early artiodactyl Gujaratia pakistanensis and the tapiroid perissodactyl Karagalax mamikhelensis; the presence of adapids and arctocyonids in the area indicates that it probably had an older age than the Ganda Kas fauna.

== Paleobiota ==
=== Mammals ===
Color key: Taxon / Reclassified taxon / Taxon falsely reported as present / Dubious taxon or junior synonym / Ichnotaxon / Ootaxon / Morphotaxon	Notes; Uncertain or tentative taxa are in small text; ~~crossed out~~ taxa are discredited.

==== Arctocyonia ====
Name	Species	Locality/Member	Material	Notes	Image
Karakia	K. longidens	H-GSP Loc. 9710, Banda Daud Shah	A single, fragmentary mandible.	The first arctocyonid from Indo-Pakistan.	

==== Artiodactyla ====
===== Cetaceans =====
Name	Species	Locality/Member	Material	Notes	Image
Ambulocetus	A. natans	H-GSP Loc. 9209 & 9204	Several specimens.	An ambulocetid cetacean.	
Attockicetus	A. praecursor	H-GSP Loc. 9204 H-GSP Loc. 9607, Shepherd's Lake	An incomplete cranium, worn teeth, premolars.	A remingtonocetid cetacean.	
Attockicetus	Cf. A. sp.	H-GSP Loc. 9607, Shepherd's Lake	Two teeth	A remingtonocetid cetacean.	
Basilosauridae indet.		Ganda Kas	Two isolated teeth.	One of the teeth resemble those of Ichthyolestes.	
Gandakasia	G. potens	H-GSP Loc. 58, Ganda Kas; H-GSP Loc. 9607 Shepherd's Lake	A fragmentary mandible	A protocetid cetacean	
Ichthyolestes	I. pinfoldi	H-GSP Loc. 62, Ganda Kas	A single molar	A pakicetid.	
Nalacetus	N. ratimitus	H-GSP Loc. 62, Ganda Kas	Fragments of palate, maxilla and teeth	A pakicetid cetacean	
Pakicetus	P. attocki	H-GSP Loc. 62, Ganda Kas	Complete cranial remains.	A pakicetid cetacean	
Pakicetus	P. calcis	H-GSP Loc. 9607 Shepherd's Lake; H-GSP Loc. 9607, Valley E	A partial mandible, palate fragment and teeth	A pakicetid cetacean	
Pakicetus	P. chittas	Chorlakki H-GSP Loc. 9607, Shepherd's Lake	Fragments of mandibles	A pakicetid cetacean	
Pakicetus	P. inachus	Chorlakki	A partial skull, mandible and teeth	A pakicetid cetacean	
Protocetidae indet.		Ganda Kas	Jaw fragment and two isolated teeth	One of the teeth resemble those of Ichthyolestes.	

===== Dichobunids =====
Name	Species	Locality/Member	Material	Notes	Image
Chorlakkia	C. hassani	Chorlakki	A left dentary and multiple teeth	A dichobunid.	
Dichobunidae indet.		Chorlakki	Teeth	Teeth distinct from the other known Kuldana dichobunids. One particular tooth might represent a hyopsodontid.	
Dulcidon	D. gandaensis	Ganda Kas & Chorlakki	Two right molar.	A dichobunid	
Pakibune	P. chorlakkiensis	Chorlakki & Lammidhan	Teeth	A moderately sized dichobunid, larger than the other dichobunid taxa from the formation.	

===== Other artiodactyls =====
Name	Species	Locality/Member	Material	Notes	Image
Artiodactyla indet.		Chorlakki	An astragalus and two calcaneum	These fossil remains are considered too large and robust to have belonged to the Chorlakki dichobunids or Indohyus.	
Gobiohyus	cf. G. orientalis	Ganda Kas	A single tooth.	A helohyid.	
Gujaratia	G. pakistanensis	Chorlakki; Lammidhan; Barbora Banda I & II; H-GSP Loc. 300, 9710 & 9712, Banda Daud Shah	Teeth	A diacodexeid. Gujaratia is rare at Chorlakki and may be the only artiodactyl at Barbora Banda. Formerly classified within the European and American genus Diacodexis.	
Indohyus	I. indirae	Ganda Kas, Chorlakki & Kalakot	Numerous specimens	A raoellid. The most abundant artiodactyl at Kalakot, but less common at Chorlakki where Khirtharia is more prominent.	
Khirtharia	K. dayi	Chorlakki, Kalakot & Panoba H-GSP Loc. 62, Ganda Kas	Fragments of maxilla and mandibles; isolated teeth	A raoellid. Khirtharia is the most abundant artiodactyl at Chorlakki and more common than Indohyus, but the reverse is seen at Kalakot.	
Khirtharia	K. major	Chorlakki	An isolated tooth	A larger species of raoellid, that would reach about twice the size of K. dayi and I. indirae, but might also represent an unrelated species of diacodexid or dichobunid.	

==== Chiroptera ====
Name	Species	Locality/Member	Material	Notes	Image
Chiropteran indet. A		Chorlakki	A molar		
Chiropteran indet. B		Chorlakki	Two fragmentary molars	Resemble that of Palaeochiropteryx, and may belong to a relatively large bat.	

==== Eulipotyphla ====
Name	Species	Locality/Member	Material	Notes	Image
Pakilestes	P. lathrius	Chorlakki	Two molars and a premolar	An insectivore mammal of uncertain affinities, possibly a plesiosoricid soricomorph.	
Perizalambdodon	P. punjabiensis	H-GSP Loc. 9610, Jhalar	A single molar	An indeterminate lipotyphlan.	
Seia	S. shahi	Chorlakki	Two molars	An erinaceomorph, probably representing a new family.	

==== Herpetotheriidae ====
Name	Species	Locality/Member	Material	Notes	Image
Herpetotheriinae indet.		H-GSP Loc. 62, Ganda Kas	A right molar.		

==== Hyaenodonta ====
Name	Species	Locality/Member	Material	Notes	Image
Paratritemnodon	P. indicus	Ganda Kas & Chorlakki	A mandible (now lost), several isolated teeth	Represent a smaller form of hyaenodont.	
Paratritemnodon	P. jandewalensis	H-GSP Loc. 9205, Ganda Kas	Fragmentary maxilla and isolated tooth.	The teeth are twice as large than those of P. indicus, and it was probably much larger.	

==== Mesonychia ====
Name	Species	Locality/Member	Material	Notes	Image
Mesonychidae indet.		Ganda Kas	A single premolar	Belongs to a small mesonychid, with similarities to Hapalodectes.	

==== Perissodactyla ====
Name	Species	Locality/Member	Material	Notes	Image
Anthracobune	A. pinfoldi	Upper Member : Lammidhan & Ganda Kas	Relatively complete cranial remains and isolated teeth.	The largest anthracobunid in the formation.	
Anthracobune	A. wardi	Chorlakki & Ganda Kas	Several mandibles, fragments of a skull and isolated teeth.	An anthracobunid. Formerly the distinct genus Lammidhania, also present in the Subathu Formation. Includes the holotype of Pilgrimella pilgrimi.	
"Forstercooperia"	"F." jigniensis	Chorlakki	Teeth	A paraceratheriid.	
Isectolophidae indet.		Chorlakki	A tooth		
Jozaria	J. palustris	Upper Member	Several teeth	An anthracobunid.	
cf. Kalakotia	K. sp.	H-GSP Loc. 62, Ganda Kas H-GSP Loc. 9613, Thatta	A fragmentary maxilla and isolated teeth	A lophialetid tapiroid, probably representing a new species.	
Karagalax	K. mamikhelensis	H-GSP Loc. 300, Barbora Banda	Several relatively well-preserved skulls; isolated postcranial elements tentatively referred to the genus.	An isectolophid tapiromorph, more cursorial than its contemporary American relatives.	
Obergfellia	O. occidentalis	Ganda Kas	Several mandibles.	An anthracobunid. Includes most of the material formerly assigned to Pilgrimella pilgrimi.	
Palaeosyops	P. dayi	Chorlakki H-GSP Loc. 64, 9613 and 227, Ganda Kas & Thatta	Fragmentary maxilla and mandible; isolated teeth	Formerly belonging to the genus Eotitanops, it seems to be intermediate between the two genera. A small and primitive brontothere. Also present in the Baska Formation.	
Pakotitanops	P. latidentatus	H-GSP Loc. 9205 & 9206, Ganda Kas	A fragmentary maxilla and isolated teeth	A brontothere, distinctly larger and more derived than Eotitanops.	

==== Primates ====
Name	Species	Locality/Member	Material	Notes	Image
Cf. Agerinia	Cf. A. sp.	Chorlakki	A tooth.	A notharctid, with similarities to A. roselli.	
Jattadectes	J. mamikheli	H-GSP Loc. 9712, Banda Daud Shah	A premolar and an incisor	The first plesiadapid from Indo-Pakistan.	
Kohatius	K. coppensi	Chorlakki	Teeth.	An omomyid. Might also be present in the Ghazij Formation.	
Kohatius	cf. K. sp.	Barbora	Mandible fragment.	An omomyid; the smallest primate in Indo-Pakistan.	
Kohatius	K. sp. A	H-GSP Locality 223, Jhalar	A premolar.	An omomyid with similarities with Altanius.	
Panobius	P. afridi	Chorlakki	Two isolated teeth.	An adapid.	
Panobius	P. amplior	Either from Chorlakki, or from H-GSP Loc. 9712, Banda Daud Shah.	A fragmentary mandible with two associated molars and isolated teeth.	An adapid, much larger than P. russelli and P. afridi, to which it was firstly attributed.	
Parvocristes	P. oligocollis	H-GSP Loc. 225, Jhalar	A premolar and an incisor	A carpolestid.	

==== Rodentia ====
Name	Species	Locality/Member	Material	Notes	Image
Birbalomys	B. (Basalomys) ijlsti	H-GSP Loc. 62, Ganda Kas	Teeth	A chappatimyid, the most common rodent in its locality.	
Birbalomys	B. (Birbalomys) sondaari	Chorlakki H-GSP Loc. 57, 62 and 144, Ganda Kas	Teeth	A chappatimyid abundant in Chorlakki and Ganda Kas.	
Birbalomys	B. (Birbalomys) woodi	Chorlakki	Three teeth.	A chappatimyid. Relatively rare in Chorlakki, but abundant in other similarly-aged formations.	
Birbalomys	B. (Basalomys) vandermeuleni	Shekhan, Chorlakki H-GSP Loc. 57 & 144, Ganda Kas		A chappatimyid. Formerly Saykanomys.	
Chapattimys	C. debruijni	Chorlakki H-GSP Loc. 9205, Ganda Kas	Teeth	One of the largest chappatimyid in Indo-Pakistan, reaching twice the size of C. wilsoni. Quite rare in all the deposits where it is found.	
Chapattimys	C. wilsoni	Chorlakki H-GSP Loc. 62 & 144, Ganda Kas	Teeth	A chappatimyid.	
Gumbatomys	G. asifi	H-GSP Loc. 62, Ganda Kas; Chorlakki	Several teeth	A rare chappatimyid.	
Paramyidae indet.		Barbora Banda I	Teeth		
Cf. Petrokozlovia	Cf. P. sp. indet. 1	Chorlakki H-GSP Loc. 57, Ganda Kas	One tooth.	Less derived than P. notos, but similar to a more primitive specimen from Kazakhstan.	
Cf. Petrokozlovia	Cf. P. sp. indet. 2	Chorlakki	One tooth.	Seemingly closer to P. notos, from Mongolia, than the other species.	
Cf. Tamquammys	Cf. T. sp.	Chorlakki		A Tamquammyidae.	
Tamquammyidae indet.	spe. indet. 1	Barbora Banda I	Teeth		
Tamquammyidae indet.	spe. indet. 2	Barbora Banda I	Teeth		

==== Tillodontia ====
Name	Species	Locality/Member	Material	Notes	Image
Basalina	B. basalensis	Ganda Kas & Chorlakki	A fragmentary mandible and associated teeth.	A small estonychid tillodont, firstly identified as a taeniodont.	
Basalina	cf. B. basalensis	Ganda Kas	A jaw fragment.	The heavy wear on the specimen renders the identification as B. basalensis only tentative.	

==== Other mammals ====
Name	Species	Locality/Member	Material	Notes	Image
Mammalia indet.		Barbora Banda II	A single, large incisor.	May belong to a small artiodactyl.	

=== Fish ===
==== Actinopterygians ====
Name	Species	Locality/Member	Material	Notes	Image
Acanthopterygii indet.		Chorlakki & Shekhan Nala	Several isolated teeth.	Some of the teeth might belong to an Osteoglossiforme indeterminate.	
Amiidae indet.		H-GSP Loc. 56, Ganda Kas redbeds	Partial right premaxilla with associated teeth.	From predominantly marine deposits.	
Anchichanna	S. kuldanensis	H-GSP Loc. 62, Ganda Kas	Several relatively complete cranial remains.	A snakehead.	
Ariidae indet.		Chorlakki	Several abdominal vertebra.	Despite being primarily marine, ariid catfish are known to frequently enter freshwater environments.	
Bagridae indet.		Chorlakki	An angular bone, a cleithrum and pectoral spines.		
Cf. Bagridae indet.		H-GSP Loc. 62, Ganda Kas	Fragments of the skull and spines.	Might represent several species of catfish.	
Clariidae indet.		Chorlakki & Shekhan Nala	An articular bone and pectoral spines.	The low angular resemble that of Heterobranchus.	
Cyprinidae indet.		Chorlakki	A pharyngeal tooth.		
Cyprinodontidae indet.		Chorlakki	Several teeth and a quadrate bone.	The teeth are similar to those of Aphanius.	
Eotrigonodontidae indet.		H-GSP Loc. 229 & 9607, Shepherd's Lake	Two teeth.	Tentatively referred to the Mesozoic genera Hadrodus or Stephanodus.	
Lepisosteus	L. sp.	Chorlakki	A tooth and a scale.	Appears to be closely related or identical to the modern genus Lepisosteus osseus.	
Percalates	P. antiquus (=Macquaria antiquus)	Chorlakki	Various bone fragments and isolated spines	A percalatid.	
Osteoglossidae indet.		Scales : Chorlakki & Shekhan Nala Maxilla : H-GSP Loc. 9611	A maxilla, several scales of various size and shape.		
Perciformes indet.		H-GSP Loc. 62, Ganda Kas	Isolated fin spine.	Distinct from Macquaria antiquus.	
Pycnodontoidea indet.		H-GSP Loc. 9206 & 9608, Ganda Kas; H-GSP Loc. 9607, Shepherd's Lake	Several isolated teeth and a jaw fragment.	From predominantly marine deposits.	
Siluriforme indet.		Chorlakki	A basioccipital.		
Teleostei indet.		H-GSP Loc. 62, Ganda Kas	Isolated teeth.	From predominantly freshwater deposits, possibly representing several species.	
Cf. Varohstichthys	Cf. V. sp.	Chorlakki	A pharyngeal tooth.	A Cyprinidae.	

==== Chondrichthyans ====
Name	Species	Locality/Member	Material	Notes	Image
Selachimorpha indet.		H-GSP Loc. 9607, Shepherd's Lake	Teeth.		

=== Reptiles ===
==== Crocodilians ====
Name	Species	Locality/Member	Material	Notes	Image
Crocodilia indet.		Barbora Banda II & H-GSP Loc. 62, Ganda Kas			

==== Squamates ====
Name	Species	Locality/Member	Material	Notes	Image
Tinosaurus	T. sp.	Chorlakki	Two isolated teeth.	Similarities can be observed with Eocene species of Tinosaurus from North America and China.	
Sauria indet.		Chorlakki	A fragmentary vertebra.		
Boidae indet.		Chorlakki	Five fragmentary vertebrae.		
Erycinae indet.		Chorlakki	Two fragmentary vertebrae.	The material probably represent a new genus and species of sand boa.	
Boinae indet.		Chorlakki	Two fragmentary vertebrae.	The material probably represent a new genus and species of boa resembling the Eocene genera Paleryx and Palaeopython.	

==== Turtles ====
Name	Species	Locality/Member	Material	Notes	Image
Trionychinae indet.		Chorlakki	Four fragments of pleural plates.	The fragments belonged to a shell reaching 30 cm in length and are similar to plates found in the Kala Chitta Hills and Lammidhan localities.	
"Chorlakkichelys"	"C. shahi"	Chorlakki	Fragmentary shell belonging to a single individual.	A Carretochelyinae. Material from Chharat, Jhalar and Lammidhan can be tentatively assigned to the genus. A 2014 study established that the genus Chorlakkichelys is a nomem dubium due to its lack of diagnostic apomorphy.	

=== Mollusca ===
Name	Species	Locality/Member/Microfacies	Material	Notes	Image
Bivalvia indet.		Molluscan microfacies Ostracode wackestone	"Oyster" shell fragments	Composes more than half of the molluscan microfacies.	
Gastropoda indet.		Molluscan microfacies Ostracode wackestone			
Planorbis	P. sp.	Chorlakki; Shekhan Nala; H-GSP Loc. 62, Ganda Kas; H-GSP Loc. 9607, Shepherd's Lake		A freshwater snail.	

=== Plants ===
Color key: Taxon / Reclassified taxon / Taxon falsely reported as present / Dubious taxon or junior synonym / Ichnotaxon / Ootaxon / Morphotaxon	Notes; Uncertain or tentative taxa are in small text; ~~crossed out~~ taxa are discredited.

Name	Species	Locality/Member	Material	Notes	Image
Cf. Ajunginucilla	Cf. C. sp.	Barbora Banda I	Seeds.	A sage.	
Celtis	C. sp.	Barbora Banda I	Seeds.	A hackberry.	
Chara	C. sp.	Barbora Banda I	Seeds.	A charophyte.	

=== Other microfossils ===
Name	Species	Microfacies	Material	Notes	Image
Assilina	A. spp.	Nummulitic wacke-packstone Assilina wacke-packstone	A foraminifera	Present in minor quantity in the nummulitic wacke-packstone, and as the dominant fossil in the Assilina wacke-packstone. Its presence in large numbers indicates deeper environments than the Nummulites deposits.	
Biantholithus	B. sparsus	Ostracode wackestone (Q-2); Nummulitic wacke-packstone (Q-15)			
Brachiopoda indet.		Molluscan microfacies			
Coccolithus	C. foraminis	Nummulitic wacke-packstone (Q-15)	Typical of warm waters		
Coccolithus	C. formusus	Nummulitic wacke-packstone (Q-15)			
Coccolithus	C. pauxillus	Ostracode wackestone (Q-2)			
Coccolithus	C. pelagicus	Lime mudstone (Q-1); Ostracode wackestone (Q-2); Nummulitic wacke-packstone (Q-15)		Typical of warm, low-latitude waters	
Cyclicargolithus	C. luminis	Nummulitic wacke-packstone (Q-15)			
Echinodermata indet.		Molluscan microfacies	Fragments		
Fasciculithus	F. lillianae	Molluscan microfacies (Q-13)			
Fasciculithus	F. tympaniformis	Molluscan microfacies (Q-13)			
Fasciculithus	F. clinatus	Molluscan microfacies (Q-13); Assilina wacke-packstone (Q-17)			
Lockhartia	L. spp.	Assilina wacke-packstone	A rotaliid	Present in minor quantity in the Assilina wacke-packstone.	
Neococcolithes	N. protenus	Nummulitic wacke-packstone (Q-15)			
Nummulites	N. spp.	Nummulitic wacke-packstone		Present as the dominant fossil in the nummulitic wacke-packstone, and in lower numbers in the Assilina wacke-packstone. Typical of a low energy marine environment.	
Ostracoda indet.		Ostracode wackestone			
Rhomboaster	R. brameletti	Ostracode wackestone (Q-2); Molluscan microfacies (Q-13); Lime mudstone (Q-14)			
Sphenolithus	S. anarrhopus	Lime mudstone (Q-1, Q-14); Ostracode wackestone (Q-2)			
Sphenolithus	S. moriformis	Molluscan microfacies (Q-13)			
Sphenolithus	S. primus	Ostracode wackestone (Q-2); Molluscan microfacies (Q-13)			
Sphenolithus	S. sp.	Lime mudstone (Q-14)	Typical of warm waters		
Tribrachiatus	T. absidatus	Assilina wacke-packstone (Q-22); Nummulitic wacke-packstone (Q-27)			
Tribrachiatus	T. lunatus	Assilina wacke-packstone (Q-22)			
Tribrachiatus	T. brameletti-contortus intergrade	Nummulitic wacke-packstone (Q-27)			
Tribrachiatus	T. contortus	Lime mudstone (Q-1); Molluscan microfacies (Q-13)			
Zeughrabdotus	Z. sigmoides	Nummulitic wacke-packstone (Q-15)		More typical of colder waters.	
