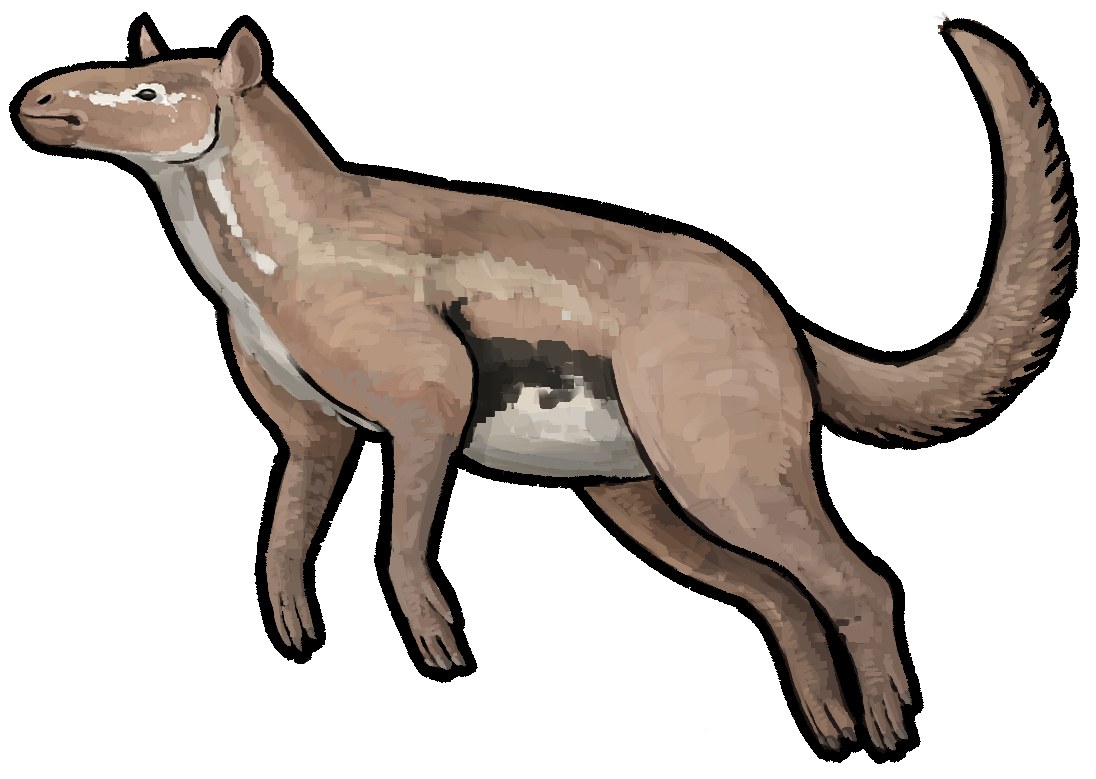
- Life restoration

Scientific classification
- Kingdom: Animalia
- Phylum: Chordata
- Class: Mammalia
- Infraclass: Placentalia
- Clade: †Anthracobunia
- Family: †Cambaytheriidae
- Genus: †Cambaytherium; Bajpai et al., 2005

Species
- †C. thewissi Bajpai et al., 2005; †C. gracilis Smith et al., 2016; †C. bidens Bajpai et al., 2005

= Cambaytherium =

Cambaytherium Temporal range: Eocene

Extinct genus of mammals

Cambaytherium is an extinct genus of placental mammals in the family Cambaytheriidae. It existed during the early Eocene approximately 55 million years ago on the Indian subcontinent. Fossils of Cambaytherium are known exclusively from the Cambay Shale Formation in western India and comprise over 200 specimens, including skulls, teeth, and postcranial elements. The genus and family were first described scientifically in 2005. Initially, placement at the base of the odd-toed ungulates was preferred, though some researchers suggested affinity with elephants within Tethytheria. Recent systematic analyses, based on abundant material, position it not at the base of odd-toed ungulates but in close relation to them. The genus's discovery on the subcontinent, then an island drifting northward toward Asia, offers insights into the origin and early evolution of the order Perissodactyla, hypothesized to have arisen in Asia.

== Description ==
Cambaytherium was a medium-sized mammal. Smaller individuals weighed an estimated 10 to 23 kg, comparable to a modern peccary. Larger forms reached up to 99 kg.

Numerous features of Cambaytherium, including dentition and sacral vertebra count, are transitional between Perissodactyla and earlier mammals, potentially reflecting the ancestral condition for all Perissodactyla. These encompass a restricted nasal cavity. The nasal bones did not protrude into the frontal bones, resulting in a transverse suture with straight margins on both bones. The orbit positioned above the posterior molars, contrasting with Tethytheria's anteriorly placed eye sockets. The zygomatic arch was complete. The mandible featured a fused mandibular symphysis extending to the second premolar. Its horizontal ramus maintained uniform depth beneath the molars, tapering anteriorly to the symphysis. The condyles ascended steeply, elevating the joints above the teeth. The coronoid process angled posteriorly and was diminished in size. The angular process extended prominently at the mandible's posterior. The dental formula matched that of primitive Eutheria: $\frac{3.1.4.3}{3.1.4.3}$. Incisors were small, spatulate or rounded. The canine extended beyond the incisors. A brief diastema separated the posterior teeth, and another occurred between the first and second premolars. Premolars lacked molarization, differing little from molars. Molars exhibited bunodont occlusal surfaces with large, conical cusps arranged in transverse pairs. This configuration precluded the lophodont pattern typical of odd-toed ungulates (transverse enamel ridges). The first two molars bore two cusp rows; the third added a third row. Molar size increased posteriorly, with the lower first molar measuring 1.1 to 1.3 cm and the third 1.5 to 1.9 cm.

The limbs display osteological traits indicating running capability, though less agile than early perissodactyls owing to its robust construction. Notable are the lumbar vertebral arches, which interarticulated robustly. The humerus was sturdy with a narrow distal end. The ulna had a robust proximal (olecranon) and mildly curved distal shaft. The olecranon constituted about 21% of bone length, aligning with early odd-toed ungulate variation. The radius lay entirely anterior to the ulna. The femur possessed a third trochanter, characteristic of odd-toed ungulates, for muscle attachment, offset proximally near the lesser trochanter's distal end. The greater trochanter was elevated, surpassing the femoral head. The tibia and fibula remained unfused. Forefeet retained at least four digits, hindfeet five with one rudimentary, unlike earliest perissodactyls limited to four digits maximally. Innermost digits (one) of fore- and hindfeet were likely shortened, known only from facets. The central digit (three) was longest, yielding the mesaxonic foot typical of odd-toed ungulates. Metapodials were robust and short overall. Terminal phalanges suggest hoof presence. Further affinity to odd-toed ungulates is evident in the talus bone's saddle-shaped distal articulation.

== Fossil record ==
Fossils of Cambaytherium are known solely from the Cambay Shale Formation in Gujarat, western India. This formation, 75 to 1500 m thick, is a fossiliferous deposit holding the subcontinent's oldest Cenozoic vertebrates. It outcrops mainly in Vastan and Mangrol coal mines, 40 km northeast of Surat. Composed of shales, claystones, and sandstones with two coal seams, vertebrate fossils emerged from thin clayey silt lenses, 5 m long and 30 cm thick, 1 to 3 m above the basal coal. Formed in nearshore settings, these date to over 54 million years via dinoflagellates and isotope analysises. This aligns with the early Eocene, about 1.5 to 1 million years post-Paleocene–Eocene Thermal Maximum. Assemblage includes early mammals like primitive primates,even-toed ungulates,rodents, and extinct groups such as Tillodontia. Birds, reptiles, amphibians, and fishes are also present.

Cambaytherium is abundant in the assemblage, with over 120 jaw and dental elements—including adult and juvenile skulls—and about 100 postcranial bones like vertebrae and limbs. Initial finds, mainly teeth and jaws, followed early 2000s detection of fossil layers, prompting extensive fieldwork. Subsequent excavations yielded fuller material, refining systematic placement.

== Paleobiology ==
Cambaytheriums morphology combines traits of swift and slower mammals. Preserved thoracic vertebrae and tightly linked lumbar ones suggest a rigid back, less flexible than in early horses like Sifrhippus. Primitive horses exhibited flexible backs in rapid locomotion, akin to modern cheetahs. Horses' stiff galloping back evolved later with size increase; Cambaytherium prefigures this somewhat. Conversely, locomotor features imply cursorial adaptation. Forelimbs had restricted elbow rotation, shown by narrow humeral distal joint and proximal ulna-radius fusion. Hindlimbs featured a tibial distal facet fully engaging the astragalus, forming a mortise joint limiting feet to parasagittal motion. Similar orientation is indicated by elevated greater trochanter and proximally shifted third trochanter on femur. Phalangeal arrangement supports digitigrade or unguligrade stance. These cursorial traits are tempered by sturdy limbs and short distal segments, unlike elongations in specialized runners. Thus, Cambaytheriums locomotion appears more generalized than earliest odd-toed ungulates.

Bunodont molars with low crowns suggest omnivorous to herbivorous feeding. Dental analyses detail diet. Larger C. thewissi individuals display early, intense occlusal wear, with anterior molar cusps abraded by full eruption of posterior molar. Wear indicates dominant vertical over horizontal mastication, implying consumption of tough plants like hard fruits or nuts. Smaller C. gracilis shows milder wear and less robust teeth, suggesting softer vegetation. Cambaytherium's robust angular process, reduced coronoid, and elevated condyle typify herbivores with pronounced masseter muscle and diminished temporalis muscle.

== Taxonomy ==
- Perissodactylamorpha
  - Perissodactyla
  - - Anthracobunia
      - Cambaytheriidae
        - - Cambaytherium
          - Nakusia
        - Perissobune
      - Anthracobunidae
    - Artiodactyla
  - Radinskya
- - - Phenacodontidae
    - Phenacolophidae
  - Afrotheria?

Systematic position of Cambaytheriidae after Rose et al. (2020)

Cambaytherium is a genus in the extinct family Cambaytheriidae. The genus and family were first described in 2005 by Sunil Bajpai and colleagues, based on lower and upper jaws plus isolated teeth from Gujarat's Cambay Shale Formation. The holotype (IITR/SB/VLM 505) is a mandible preserving bilateral teeth from last premolar to last molar. The name Cambaytherium derives from the Cambay Shale Formation—named for Khambhat (Cambay) and Gulf of Khambhat—and Greek θηρίον (thēríon, "beast"). Other Cambaytheriidae genera include Perissobune, described 2014 from a Pakistani Ghazij Formation jaw, and Nakusia, named 1999 from a Balochistan maxilla. Indobune, based on 2006 Cambay Shale maxillary fragments, is now synonymous with Cambaytherium per recent studies. Similarly, Kalitherium, introduced 2006 with a near-complete Cambay Shale skull, was synonymized with Cambaytherium in 2020.

Three species of Cambaytherium are currently recognized:

- C. gracilis (Smith et al., 2016)
- C. marinus (Bajpai et al., 2006)
- C. thewissi (Bajpai et al., 2005)

C. gracilis measures 10 to 20% smaller linearly than C. thewissi. Anterior dental and symphyseal traits exclude sexual dimorphism as cause, confirming distinct species. C. marinus, the largest, was initially in Kalitherium but reassigned to Cambaytherium in 2020. Originally, besides C. thewissi, C. bidens and C. minor were named, but now subsumed under C. thewissi. Thewissi honors J. G. M. "Hans" Thewissen for Indo-Pakistani fossil mammal research. (Correctly, it should be thewisseni.)

Originally, Cambaytherium and Cambaytheriidae were deemed primitive odd-toed ungulates, marked by bunodont molar patterns. The formation's early Eocene age supported this, as early forms like Cardiolophus or Hallensia shared similar teeth, though Cambaytherium's were simplest. Criticism noted similar patterns in Asian Anthracobunidae, with third cusp pairs on last molars; then known from teeth, they were linked to elephants. Thus, Indobune was later classed as Anthracobunidae. Nakusia, akin to Cambaytherium, was earlier placed there.

Expanded fossils, including postcrania, enable refined positioning of Cambaytherium and Cambaytheriidae as perissodactyl relatives, shown by astragalar navicular notch—a perissodactyl apomorphy—and mesaxonic hands/feet with elongated central ray. Skull traits like nasal-frontal transverse suture connect them. Primitive features absent in perissodactyls include pentadactyl limbs. Earliest perissodactyls had tetradactyl fore- and tridactyl hindlimbs (like modern tapirs). Only Sifrhippus, earliest Equidae, retained reduced hind outer digit. These suggest descent from "Condylarthra" lineages. Molars lack transverse crests for bilophodonty, typical of perissodactyls. Hence, Cambaytheriidae and Cambaytherium are perissodactyl sister group, with Anthracobunidae closely related. A concurrent cranial-mandibular study concurs, viewing Cambaytheriidae as "stem perissodactyls". It includes Anthracobunidae and semiaquatic Desmostylia—usually tethytherian—in close kinship. A 2020 analysis united Cambaytheriidae and Anthracobunidae as Anthracobunia, sister to perissodactyls, forming Perissodactylamorpha. This removes Anthracobunidae from elephant affinity.

Perissodactyls were among the most diverse Eutheria historically, emerging abruptly in early Eocene ~56 million years ago in North America and Eurasia. Asian origin was often proposed. Cambay Shale perissodactyl relatives support this, localizing to South Asia. Early Eocene India was an island post-Madagascar separation, drifting north to Asia, colliding ~50 million years ago or later. Possible island arcs may have linked it to Afro-Arabia, allowing perissodactyl ancestor dispersal. This accounts for European-like early primates and rodents in Cambay Shale. Contemporaneous Ghazij Formation in Balochistan yields early perissodactyls resembling Cambaytherium alongside advanced Tapiromorpha and Hippomorpha. Balochistan was a separate island, seaway-divided from India. Paleocene fossils are absent in both areas, hindering hypothesis verification.
