= Indobune =

Indobune Temporal range: Eocene

Scientific classification
- Kingdom: Animalia
- Phylum: Chordata
- Class: Mammalia
- Order: ?Perissodactyla
- Family: ?†Anthracobunidae
- Genus: †Indobune Rose, 2006

Species
- I. vastanensis

Genus of mammals

Indobune is an extinct genus of ungulate endemic to Asia during the Eocene from 55.8—48.6 Ma, living for approximately 7.2 million years.

== Taxonomy ==
Indobune was named by Rose et al. (2006). Its type is Indobune vastanensis. It was assigned to Anthracobunidae by Rose et al. (2006). However, in a 2014 cladistic analysis it was suggested to more likely be a member of Cambaytheriidae.

== Fossil distribution ==
Indobune fossil distribution is restricted to Gujarat state, India (Vastan lignite mine).
