= Chorlaki =

- Union Council
- Country: Pakistan
- Province: Khyber Pakhtunkhwa
- District: Kohat
- Time zone: UTC+5 (PST)

Chorlaki is a union council in the Kohat District in the Khyber Pakhtunkhwa province of Pakistan. Chorlaki is located along the Punjab–Khyber Pakhtunkhwa border with the Indus River. The population of Chorlaki is around 10,000. Approximately 94% of the population is literate. People mostly depend on government jobs. Chorlaki is rich in natural resources. It is very hot in summer and very cold in winter.

== Fossil Excavation ==
Fossil remains of Pilgrimella and Lammidhania have been found in Chorlakki.

== See also ==
- Kohat District
