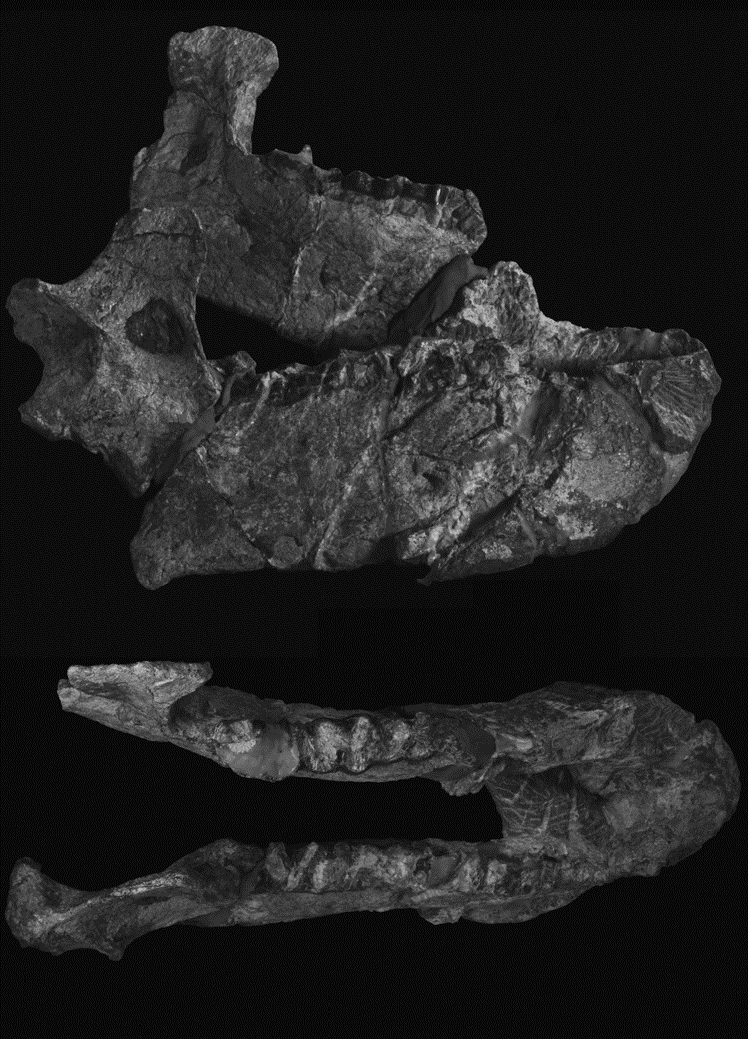
- Two views of a lower jaw

Scientific classification
- Kingdom: Animalia
- Phylum: Chordata
- Class: Mammalia
- Infraclass: Placentalia
- Family: †Anthracobunidae
- Genus: †Obergfellia; Cooper et al., 2014

Species
- O. occidentalis Cooper et al., 2014

= Obergfellia =

Obergfellia Temporal range: Middle Eocene

Extinct genus of ungulates

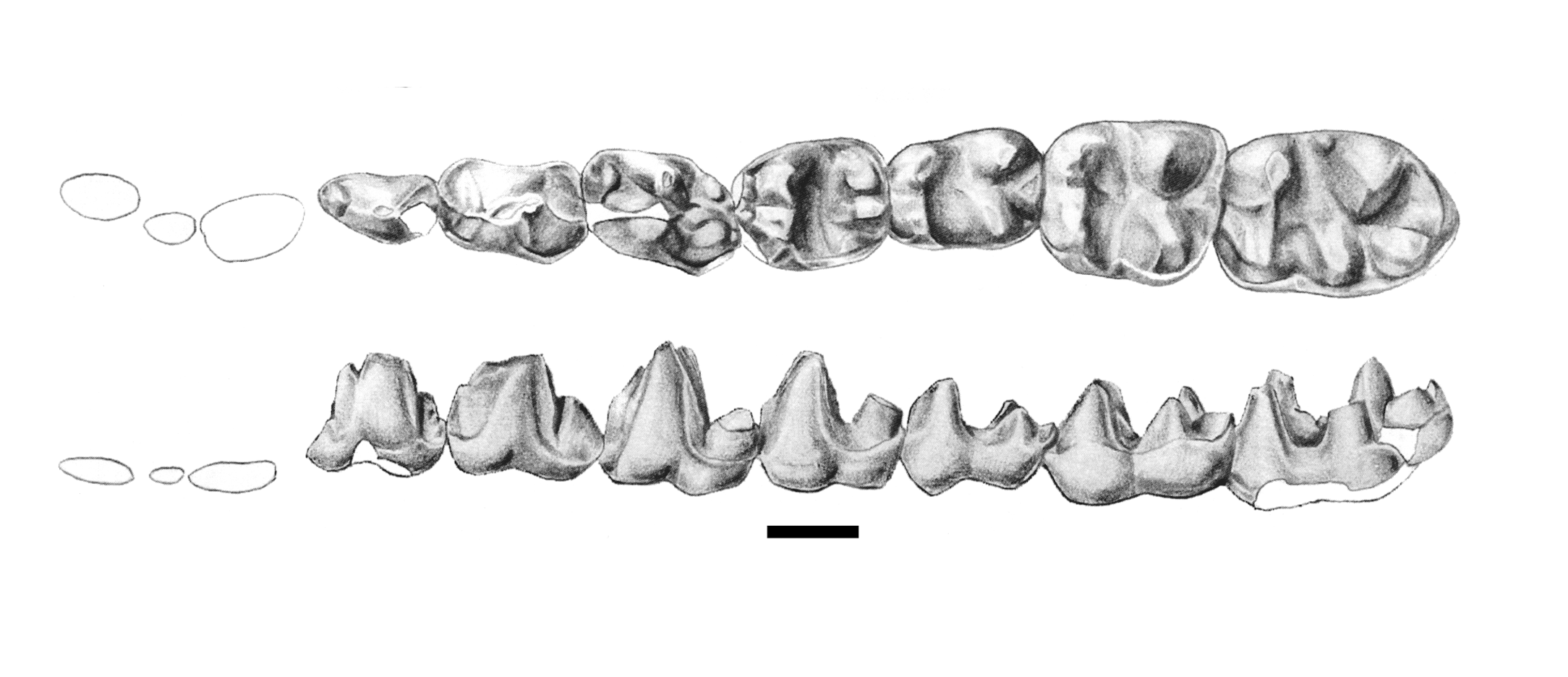
P1-m3 teeth from top and side. Bar is 1 cm.

Obergfellia is an extinct genus of stem perissodactyl from the middle Eocene, discovered in 1980. Its known range includes northern India and Pakistan.

Cooper et al. (2014) erected the genus using specimens formerly assigned to Anthracobune and Pilgrimella. It is named in memory of the vertebrate paleontologists Friedlinde Obergfell and her husband A. Ranga Rao.

The suite of features that distinguish it from other anthracobunids are broad lower molars, short lower m3, and a fairly long angular process of the mandible, but not as long as in Anthracobune.
