= Gujaratia =

Gujaratia Temporal range: Early to middle Eocene (Ypresian - Lutetian) ~50–47 Ma
- Gujaratia pakistanensis

Scientific classification
- Kingdom: Animalia
- Phylum: Chordata
- Class: Mammalia
- Order: Artiodactyla
- Family: †Diacodexeidae
- Genus: †Gujaratia; Bajpai et al, 2005

Species
- †G. pakistanensis; †G. indica

Extinct genus of Artiodactyls

Gujaratia (lit. 'belonging to Gujarat')is an extinct genus of medium-sized mammals belonging to the family Diacodexeidae, that lived in India and Pakistan during the early to middle Eocene (Ypresian to Lutetian ages). It was formerly considered a species of Diacodexis (a genus now believed to be paraphyletic), but was placed in its own genus in 2005.

== Description ==
Gujaratia is an early artiodactyl, or even-toed ungulate. Based on comparisons to its close relative Diacodexis, it would have resembled a modern duiker, measuring about 50 centimetres (1.6 ft) in body length, but with a much longer tail. Unlike most later species of artiodactyl, it still had five toes on each foot, although the third and fourth toes were already elongated. It may also have had small hooves on each toe. Its teeth suggest that it was a herbivorous browser.

== Fossil distribution ==
Gujaratia has been found in various locations in Indian subcontinent. Most notably it is known from a highly diverse Cambay Shale Formation where it coexised with numerous mammals, like Indohyaenodon and Cambaytherium, and was also present in the Kuldana Formation, where it coexisted with several early cetaceans, such as Pakicetus and Ambulocetus.
