= Jozaria =

Jozaria Temporal range: Early and Middle Eocene

Scientific classification
- Domain: Eukaryota
- Kingdom: Animalia
- Phylum: Chordata
- Class: Mammalia
- Family: †Anthracobunidae
- Genus: †Jozaria; Wells and Gingerich, 1983
- Species: †J. palustris

Binomial name
- †Jozaria palustris Wells and Gingerich, 1983

Jozaria is an extinct genus of stem perissodactyl from the Early to Middle Eocene of the Kuldana Formation of Kohat, Pakistan. It and other anthracobunids were formerly classified with proboscideans.

Only one specimen belonging to the species Jozaria palustris has been discovered so far. Geological evidences from the place of discovery indicate that the animal lived in a brackish marsh environment. It probably fed on soft aquatic vegetation.
