= Hsanotherium =

Hsanotherium Temporal range: Middle Eocene

Scientific classification
- Kingdom: Animalia
- Phylum: Chordata
- Class: Mammalia
- Family: †Anthracobunidae (?)
- Genus: †Hsanotherium; Ducrocq et al., 2000

Species
- H. parvum Ducrocq et al., 2000

Hsanotherium is an extinct genus of early ungulate from the middle Eocene, described in 2000 in the Pondaung Formation, Myanmar.

It was originally assigned to Anthracobunidae (formerly considered proboscideans, now perissodactyls) making it the first of that family to be discovered outside India and Pakistan and also the smallest. However, the authors of a 2014 cladistic study regard it as more similar to medium-sized bunodont artiodactyls, such as Haqueina.
