= Lammidhania =

Lammidhania Temporal range: Early to Middle Eocene, 52–50 Ma

Scientific classification
- Kingdom: Animalia
- Phylum: Chordata
- Class: Mammalia
- Family: †Anthracobunidae
- Genus: †Lammidhania; Gingerich, 1977

Species
- †L. wardi Pilgrim, 1940

Extinct genus of mammals

Lammidhania is an extinct genus of anthracobunids, which lived from the early to middle Eocene period. Its fossil remains were discovered in 1940 in the Chorlakki locality of the Punjab province of Pakistan.

It is the smallest known anthracobunid, and was formerly classified with proboscideans. Cooper et al. (2014) regard most specimens referred to the genus as belonging to Anthracobune.
