= Ishatherium =

Ishatherium Temporal range: early Eocene

Scientific classification
- Kingdom: Animalia
- Phylum: Chordata
- Class: Mammalia
- Family: †Anthracobunidae
- Genus: †Ishatherium; Sahmi and Kumar, 1980

Species
- I. subathuensis Sahmi and Kumar, 1980

Ishatherium is an extinct genus of ungulate from the early Eocene of the Subathu formation in northwestern India.

It is only known from a partial upper molar and was formerly classified as a sirenian. It was placed in Anthracobunidae in 1983 but this placement was rejected in a 2014 cladistic analysis.
