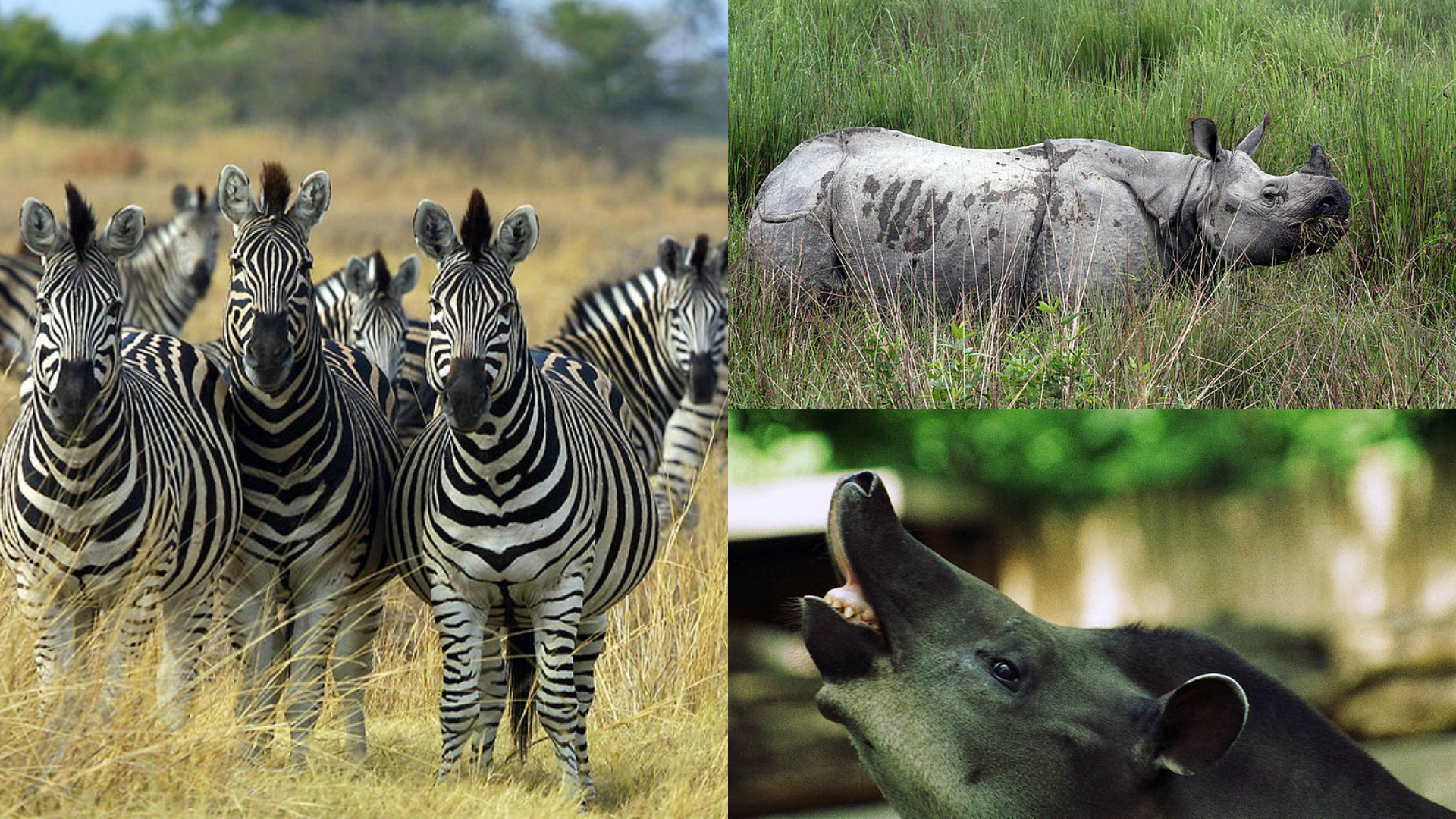
- Collage of living perissodactyls, clockwise from left: plains zebra (Equus quagga), Indian rhinoceros (Rhinoceros unicornis) and Brazilian tapir (Tapirus terrestris)
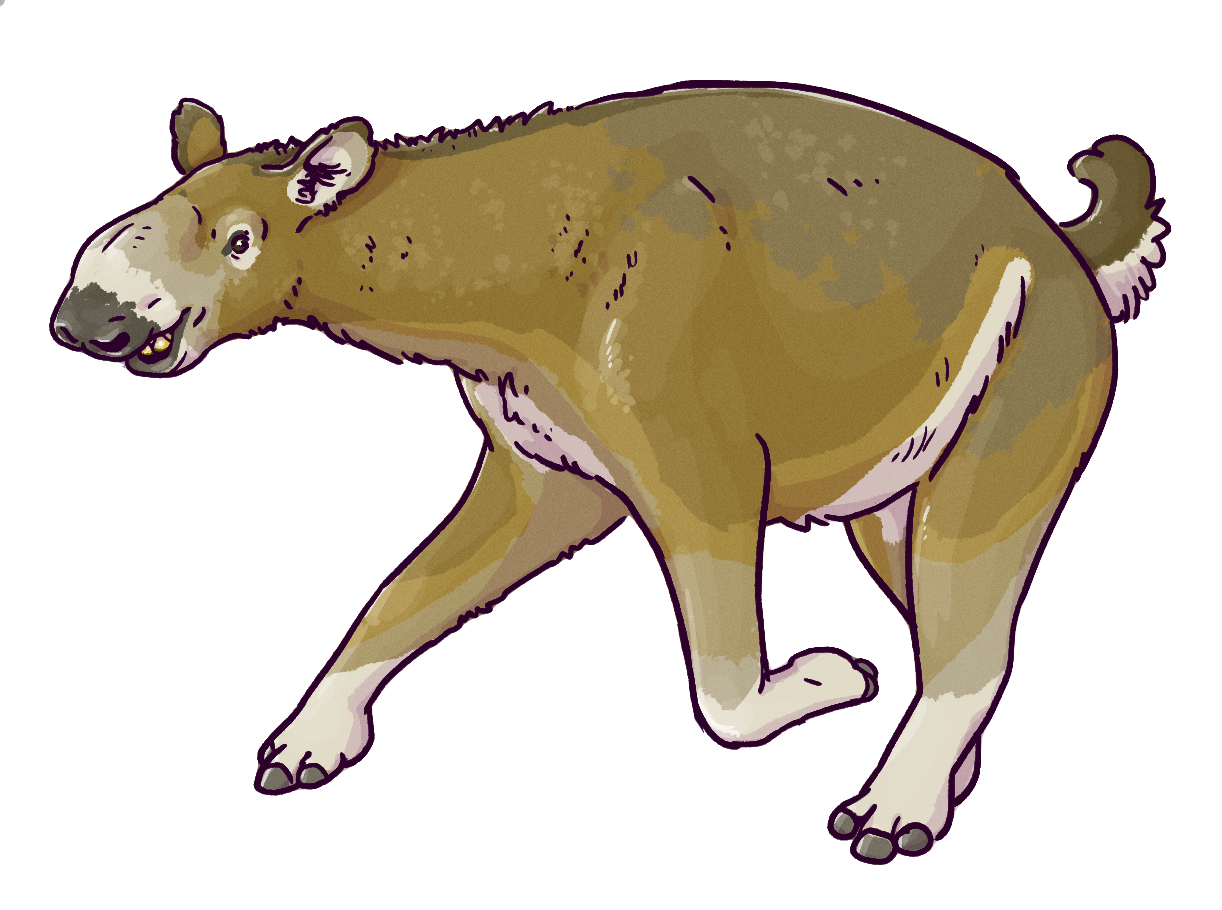
- Macrauchenia patachonica (Litopterna)

Scientific classification
- Kingdom: Animalia
- Phylum: Chordata
- Class: Mammalia
- Mirorder: Euungulata
- Clade: Panperissodactyla; Welker et al, 2015

Subgroups
- [see classification]

Synonyms
- Pan-Perissodactyla (alternative spelling)

= Panperissodactyla =

Panperissodactyla Temporal range: 64–0 Ma

Clade of mammals

Panperissodactyla ("all perissodactyls", alternatively spelled Pan-Perissodactyla) is a clade of ungulates containing living order Perissodactyla (odd-toed ungulates) and all extinct ungulates more closely related to Perissodactyla than to Artiodactyla (even-toed ungulates).

Groups thought to belong to this clade include Anthracobunia (including the families Anthracobunidae and Cambaytheriidae) known from the Paleogene of the Indian subcontinent, as well as the South American native ungulate groups Litopterna and Notoungulata, both of which went extinct approximately 12,000 years ago. Other South American native ungulate groups also possibly belong to the clade, but their placement is uncertain. The enigmatic aquatic Desmostylia have also been suggested to be related to perissodactyls in some studies, though others recover them as members of afrotherian clade Tethytheria. The Northern Hemisphere "condylarth" group Phenacodontidae has been placed as closely related to perissodactyls in some studies, though others recover it as unrelated.

== Classification and phylogeny ==
=== History of phylogeny ===
Panperissodactyla was coined in 2015, to include all mammals more closely related to living perissodactyls than to any other living mammals, following a proteomic study which found Notoungulata and Litopterna to be closely related to Perissodactyla. Panperissodactyla is preferred over the older Mesaxonia which was originally coined by Othniel Charles Marsh in 1884, as equivalent to the modern Perissodactyla. Richard Owen's original definition of Perissodactyla included the modern members in addition to the now known to be unrelated Hyracoidea. The name Mesaxonia was resurrected by Martin S. Fischer in 1989 as a replacement for Perissodactyla. Perissodactylamorpha a clade coined to include Anthracobunia and Perissodactyla, is thought to be a subgroup of Panperissodactyla, as Anthracobunia is suggested to be more closely related to Perissodactyla than Notoungulata and Litopterna are.

=== Taxonomy ===
- Clade: Pan-Perissodactyla Welker et al, 2015 (= Panperissodactyla)
  - Family: †Phenacodontidae [?] Cope, 1881
  - Family: †Hyopsodontidae [?]
  - Clade: †Meridiungulata
    - Order: †Litopterna Ameghino, 1889
    - Order: †Notoungulata Roth, 1903
    - Order: †Xenungulata?
    - Order: †Pyrotheria?
    - Order: †Astrapotheria?
  - Clade: Perissodactylamorpha Rose, et al. 2020
    - Order: Perissodactyla Owen, 1848 (odd-toed ungulates)
    - Clade: †Anthracobunia Ginsburg, 1999
      - Genus: †Radinskya [?] McKenna, 1989
      - Family: †Anthracobunidae Wells & Gingerich, 1983
      - Family: †Cambaytheriidae Bajpai, 2005
      - Order: †Desmostylia [?] Reinhart, 1959
