= Cambaytheriidae =

Cambaytheriidae Temporal range: Early Eocene

Scientific classification
- Domain: Eukaryota
- Kingdom: Animalia
- Phylum: Chordata
- Class: Mammalia
- Clade: †Anthracobunia
- Family: †Cambaytheriidae; Bajpai et al., 2005

Genera
- Cambaytherium Bajpai, Kapur, Das, Tiwari, Saravanan & Sharma, 2005; Kalitherium Bajpai, Kapur, Thewissen, Das & Tiwari, 2006

Extinct family of mammals

Cambaytheriidae is a family of primitive four or five-toed ungulates native to the Indian subcontinent. They lived during the Early Eocene epoch and are distinguished by the presence of bunodont teeth suitable for eating tough vegetation. They are related to, but distinct from, the early perissodactyls, and may also be closely related to the anthracobunids as a sister group to the Perissodactyla.
