= Nakusia =

Nakusia Temporal range: Early Eocene

Scientific classification
- Kingdom: Animalia
- Phylum: Chordata
- Class: Mammalia
- Family: †Cambaytheriidae
- Genus: †Nakusia; Ginsburg et al., 1999

Species
- N. shahrigensis Ginsburg et al., 1999

Nakusia is an extinct genus of ungulate from the early Eocene epoch, described in 1999 in the Ghazij formation of Baluchistan, Pakistan. It was classified as an anthracobunid in 1999 but was suggested in a 2014 cladistic analysis to be more likely to belong to Quettacyonidae or Cambaytheriidae.
