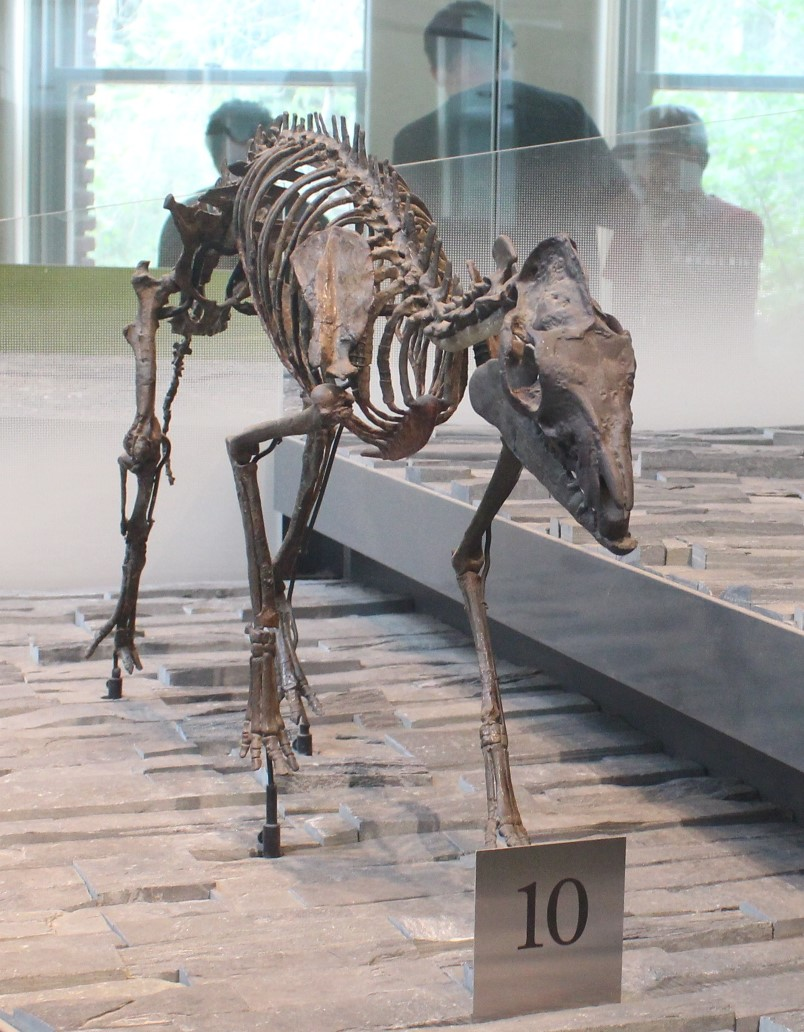
- Skeleton at the Natural History Museum of Los Angeles County

Scientific classification
- Domain: Eukaryota
- Kingdom: Animalia
- Phylum: Chordata
- Class: Mammalia
- Order: Perissodactyla
- Family: Equidae
- Genus: †Sifrhippus; Froehlich, 2002

Species
- S. sandrae (Gingerich, 1989)

Synonyms
- Hyracotherium sandrae

= Sifrhippus =

Sifrhippus Temporal range: Ypresian (Wasatchian), 55.8–50.3 Ma

Extinct genus of mammals

Sifrhippus is an extinct genus of equid containing the species S. sandrae. Sifrhippus is the oldest known equid, living during the early Eocene. Its fossils were discovered in the Bighorn Basin of Wyoming.

== Description ==
Sifrhippus would have looked quite different to modern horses, being more slender and much smaller, with a relatively small head and longer hindlimbs. Its body was built to leap around the forest undergrowth instead of galloping on open grasslands like later equids. Individuals likely weighed between 8.5–12 pounds (3.9–5.4 kg); the size variance, according to one theory, depended on the warmth of the climate.

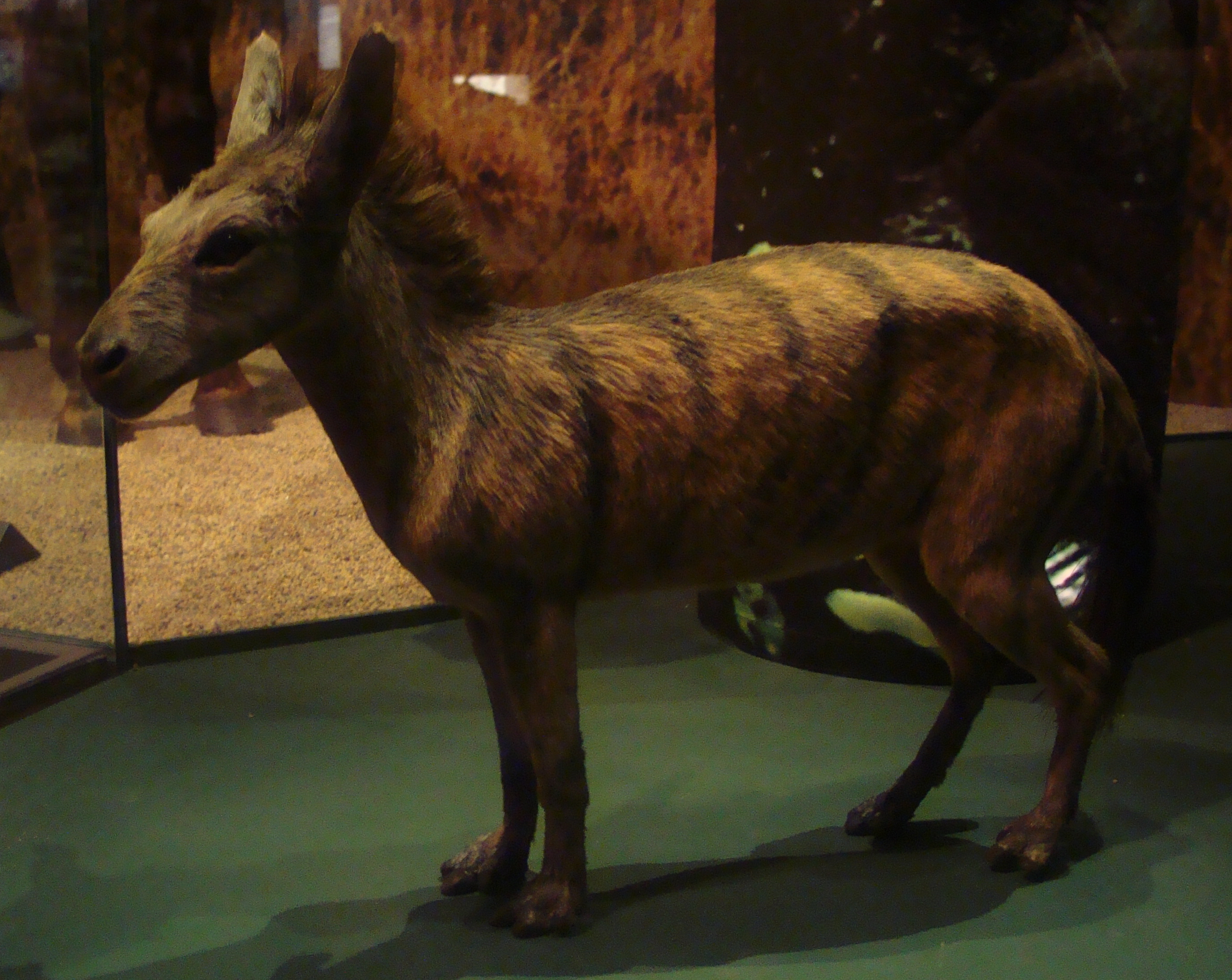
Life restoration in the Swedish Museum of Natural History

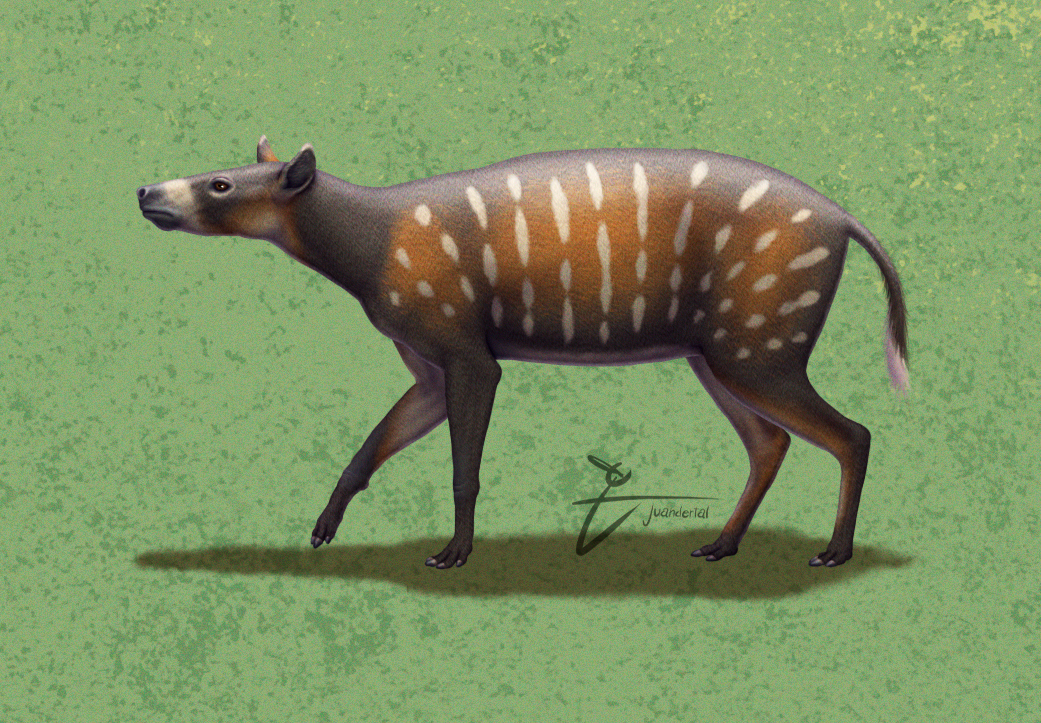
Life reconstruction based on living small-bodied, forest-dwelling ungulates.

== Taxonomy ==
Sifrhippus sandrae is referred to in earlier literature as Hyracotherium sandrae, but Froehlich, arguing that the traditional genus Hyracotherium was not monophyletic, reassigned many of its species to other genera. Froehlich gave H. sandrae the new generic name Sifrhippus, derived from the Arabic صِفْر (ṣifr), "zero", and Greek ἵππος (híppos), "horse".

Since Froehlich's reorganization of Hyracotherium based on the morphological differences between fossil specimens, one further study has suggested that Sifrhippus sandrae and Minippus jicarillai are synonymous, and also that Minippus index, although not seen by the authors of this study, is a synonym for the same taxon, which should then be named Sifrhippus index. It has been argued that the differences in the fossils are more likely caused by individual variation in animals.
