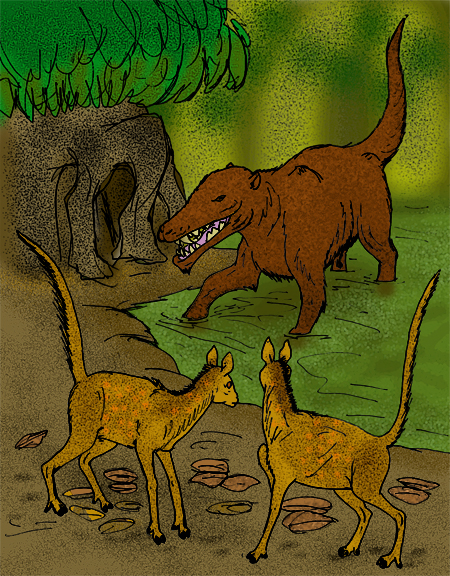
- Gujaratia pakistanensis and Pakicetus inachus

Scientific classification
- Kingdom: Animalia
- Phylum: Chordata
- Class: Mammalia
- Order: Artiodactyla
- Superfamily: †Dichobunoidea
- Family: †Diacodexeidae; Krishtalka & Stucky, 1985

Species
- See text

= Diacodexeidae =

Diacodexeidae Temporal range: Early Eocene (Wasatchian-Bridgerian) ~55.4–46.2 Ma

Extinct family of Artiodactyls

Diacodexeidae is an extinct family of basal artiodactyl mammals from the Eocene of North America, Europe, and Asia. The family includes some of the earliest known artiodactyls, such as Diacodexis. They were small animals with short snouts, and closely related to the dichobunids, with which they were formerly classified.

The following genera are recognised:

† Family Diacodexeidae

- Bunophorus (North America, Europe)
- Diacodexis (North America, Europe)
- Eolantianius (Kyrgyzstan)
- Gujaratia (Pakistan, India)
- Neodiacodexis (Wyoming)
- Simpsonodus (Colorado)
- Tapochoerus (California)
