= Pilgrimella =

Scientific classification
- Kingdom: Animalia
- Phylum: Chordata
- Class: Mammalia
- Family: †Anthracobunidae
- Genus: †Pilgrimella

Species
- P. pilgrimi

Extinct genus of mammals

Pilgrimella is an extinct early Eocene genus of anthracobunid, a group of stem perissodactyls (formerly classified with proboscideans). It was a ground dwelling grazer with massive bilophodont molars (cusps aligned in two transverse ridges.) Dental remains of this animal have been found in Chorlakki, Punjab province, Pakistan, and in the Subathu Formation in North-West India.

The genus is considered by some paleontologists as a synonym of Anthracobune.
