= Radinskya =

Radinskya Temporal range: Paleocene

Scientific classification
- Kingdom: Animalia
- Phylum: Chordata
- Class: Mammalia
- Mirorder: Euungulata
- Genus: †Radinskya; McKenna et al. 1989

Species
- †R. yupingae McKenna et al. 1989

Extinct genus of mammals

Radinskya is an extinct perissodactyl-like mammal from the Paleocene of China (Nongshanian ALMA). It is named after palaeontologist and perissodactyl expert Leonard Radinsky who died prematurely in 1985.

Before the discovery of Radinskya, palaeontologists speculated on an American origin for the tethythere-perissodactyl radiation that took place during the Paleocene-Eocene transition (around 55 million years ago). The primitive Radinskya from China made it clear that this radiation began in Asia during the Paleocene, from where it spread to North America, Europe, and Africa during the Eocene. With its enigmatic position at the base of this radiation, Radinskya is a member of the Chinese Paleocene fauna which includes primitive tethytheres such as Minchenella and the oldest arsinoitheres; it shares many characters with perissodactyls and some with phenacolophids, but is too primitive to be called either a horse, a rhino, or a tapir.

Radinskya is known only from a partial skull and upper dentition, which makes it difficult to assess its relationships to other fossils. Rose 2006 described the upper molars as "quadrate with a rhomboid outline and a weak, π-shaped crown pattern formed by the incipient ectoloph, protoloph, and metaloph (crests on the crowns). This arrangement closely resembles the crown pattern of early perissodactyls, but the strong conules (cusps) and some other characters suggest relationship to phenacolophids" and added that "Radinskya may be the sister taxon of all other Altungulata or may be closer to the origin of Perissodactyla than is any phenacodontid."

Radinskya has also been included into the Embrithopoda, treated as an outgroup to perissodactyls. Other Nongshanian phenacolophids include Yuelophus, Tienshanilophus, Ganolophus and the large form Minchenella.
