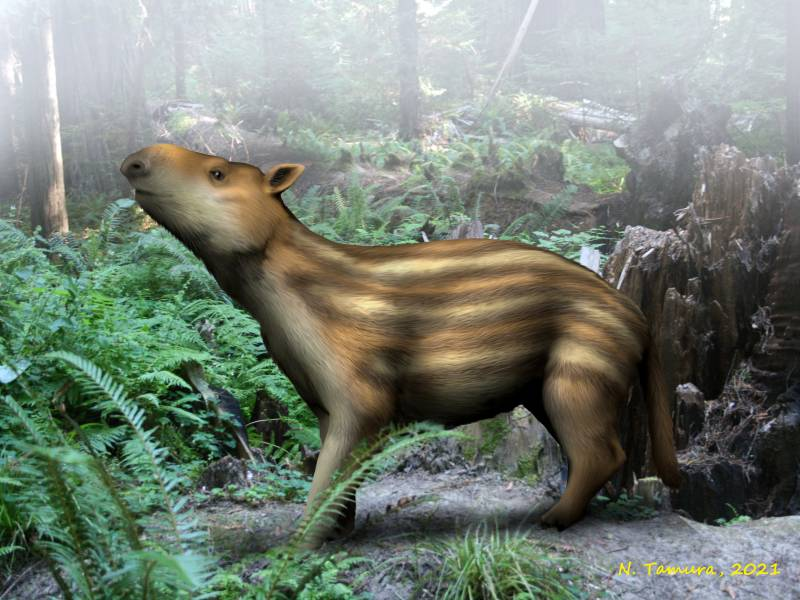
- Life restoration

Scientific classification
- Kingdom: Animalia
- Phylum: Chordata
- Class: Mammalia
- Infraclass: Placentalia
- Family: †Anthracobunidae
- Genus: †Anthracobune; Pilgrim 1940

Species
- A. pinfoldi (type) Pilgrim 1940; A. wardi Dehm and Oettingen-Spielberg, 1958
- The inferred range of Anthracobune

= Anthracobune =

Anthracobune Temporal range: Middle Eocene

Eocene-epoch mammal

Anthracobune ("coal mound") is an extinct genus of stem perissodactyl from the middle Eocene of the Upper Kuldana Formation of Kohat, Punjab, Pakistan.

The size of a small tapir, it lived in a marshy environment and fed on soft aquatic plants. It is the largest-known anthracobunid. This group was formerly classified with proboscideans.
