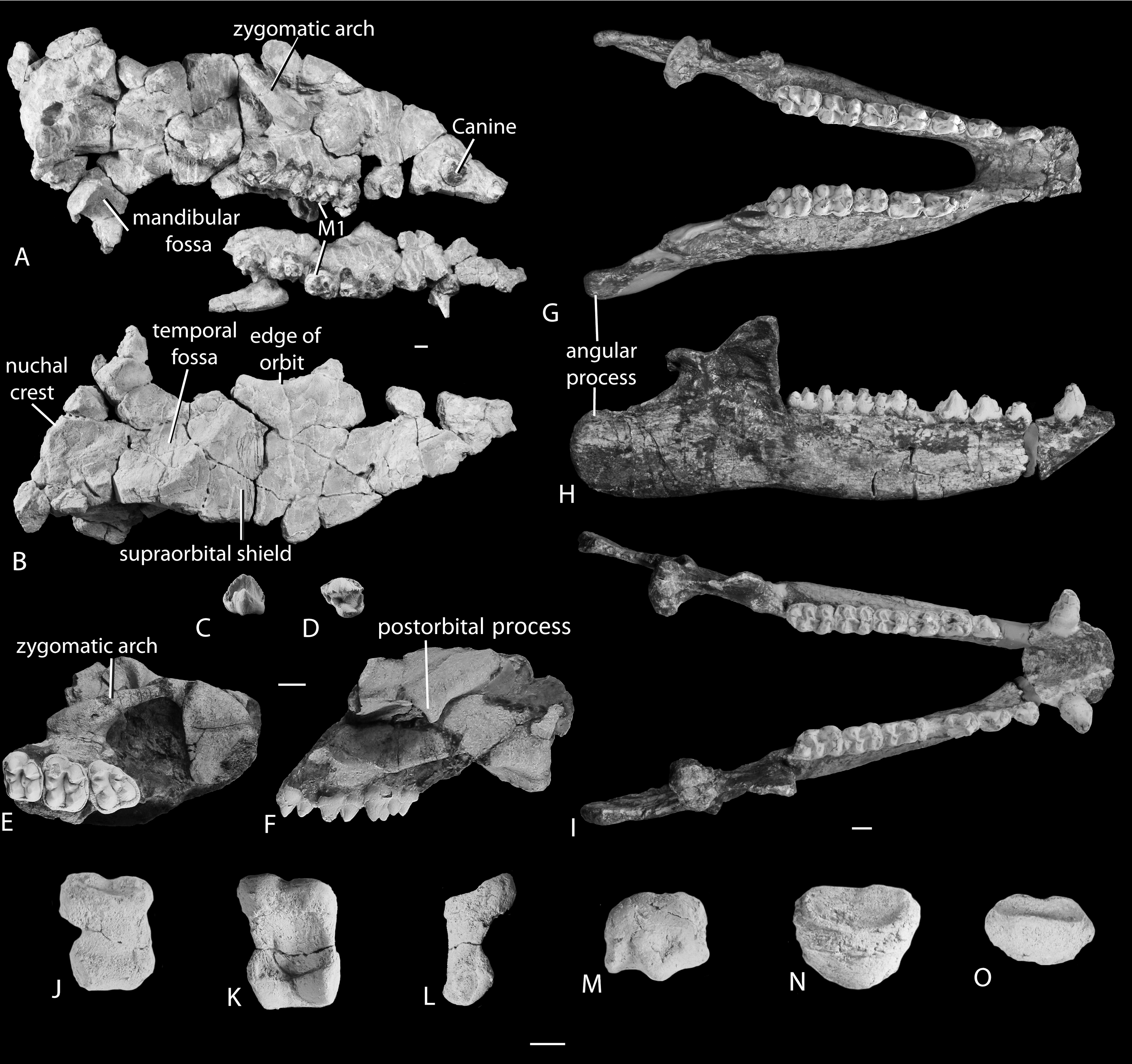
- Cranial elements of anthracobunids

Scientific classification
- Kingdom: Animalia
- Phylum: Chordata
- Class: Mammalia
- Clade: †Anthracobunia
- Family: †Anthracobunidae; Wells and Gingerich, 1983

Genera (Note: Ishatherium, Hsanotherium, Indobune and Nakusia, formerly assigned to Anthracobunidae, have been removed by the authors of a 2014 cladistic analysis, while most specimens formerly referred to Pilgrimella and Lammidhania have been transferred to Anthracobune.)
- †Anthracobune; †Jozaria; †Obergfellia

= Anthracobunidae =

Anthracobunidae Temporal range: Early Eocene–Middle Eocene

Extinct family of mammals

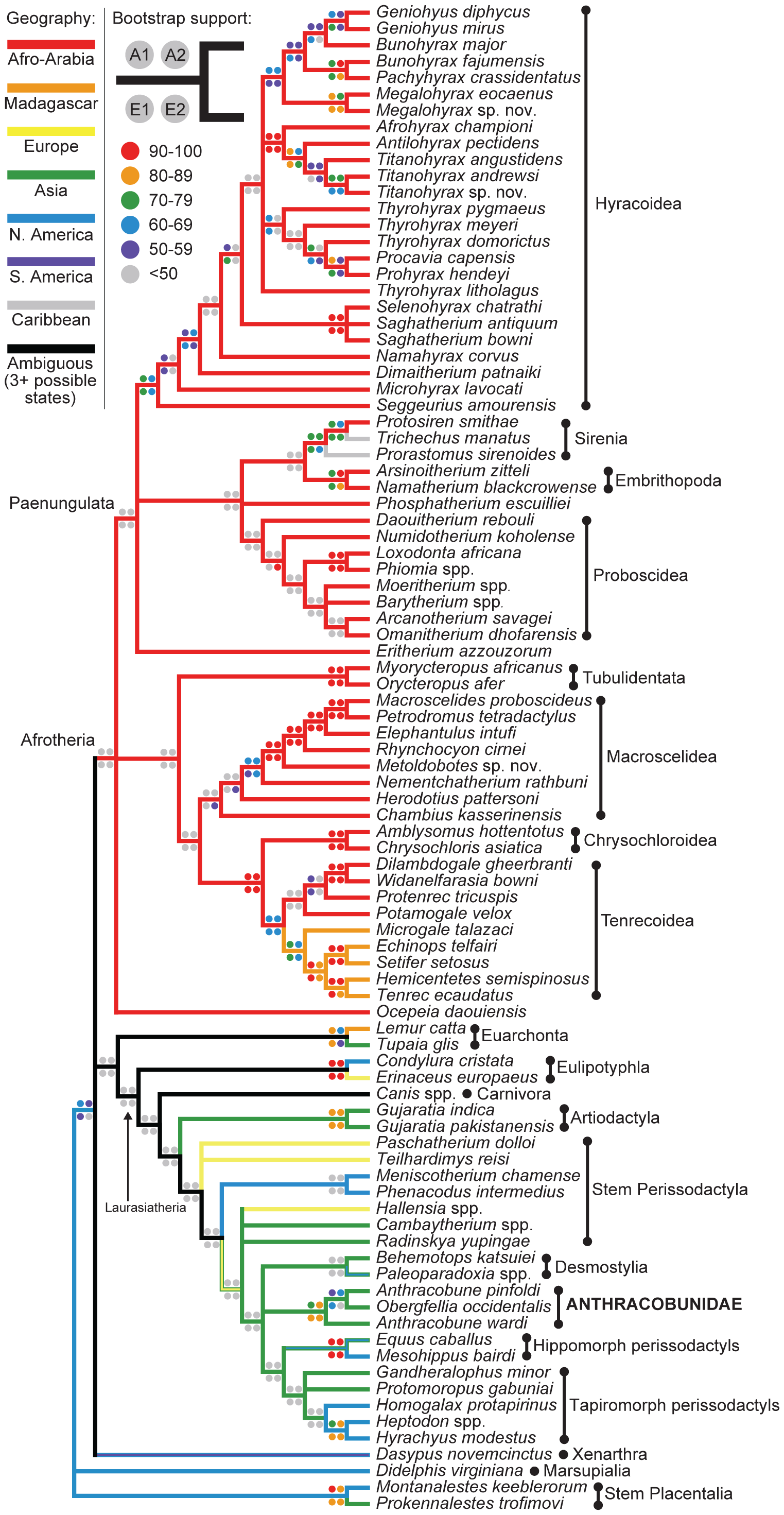
Parsimony analyses consensus tree for phylogeny of anthracobunids from cladistic study by Cooper et al. (2014), showing them (near the bottom) placed within Perissodactyla next to Desmostylia.

Anthracobunidae is an extinct family of stem perissodactyls that lived in the early to middle Eocene period. They were originally considered to be a paraphyletic family of primitive proboscideans possibly ancestral to the Moeritheriidae and the desmostylians. The family has also thought to be ancestral to the Sirenia.

They superficially resemble the Moeritheriidae in both size and cheek tooth morphology, but lack their characteristic tusks. They were relatively small, ranging in size from 1 to 2 m in length. They are known only from fragmentary remains (mainly teeth) from Eocene deposits of the northwestern part of the Indian subcontinent. Recently excavated fossils with well-preserved jaws and teeth demonstrate that these animals were either perissodactyls or else part of a more primitive sister group to the perissodactyls. The anthracobunids were probably amphibious and lived in marshy environments. Analyses of stable isotopes and long bone geometry suggest most anthracobunids fed on terrestrial vegetation, but lived near water. The same cladistic analyses that prompted their new placement also imply that the semiaquatic marine desmostylians, another putative non-African afrotherian group, were closely related to the anthracobunids.
