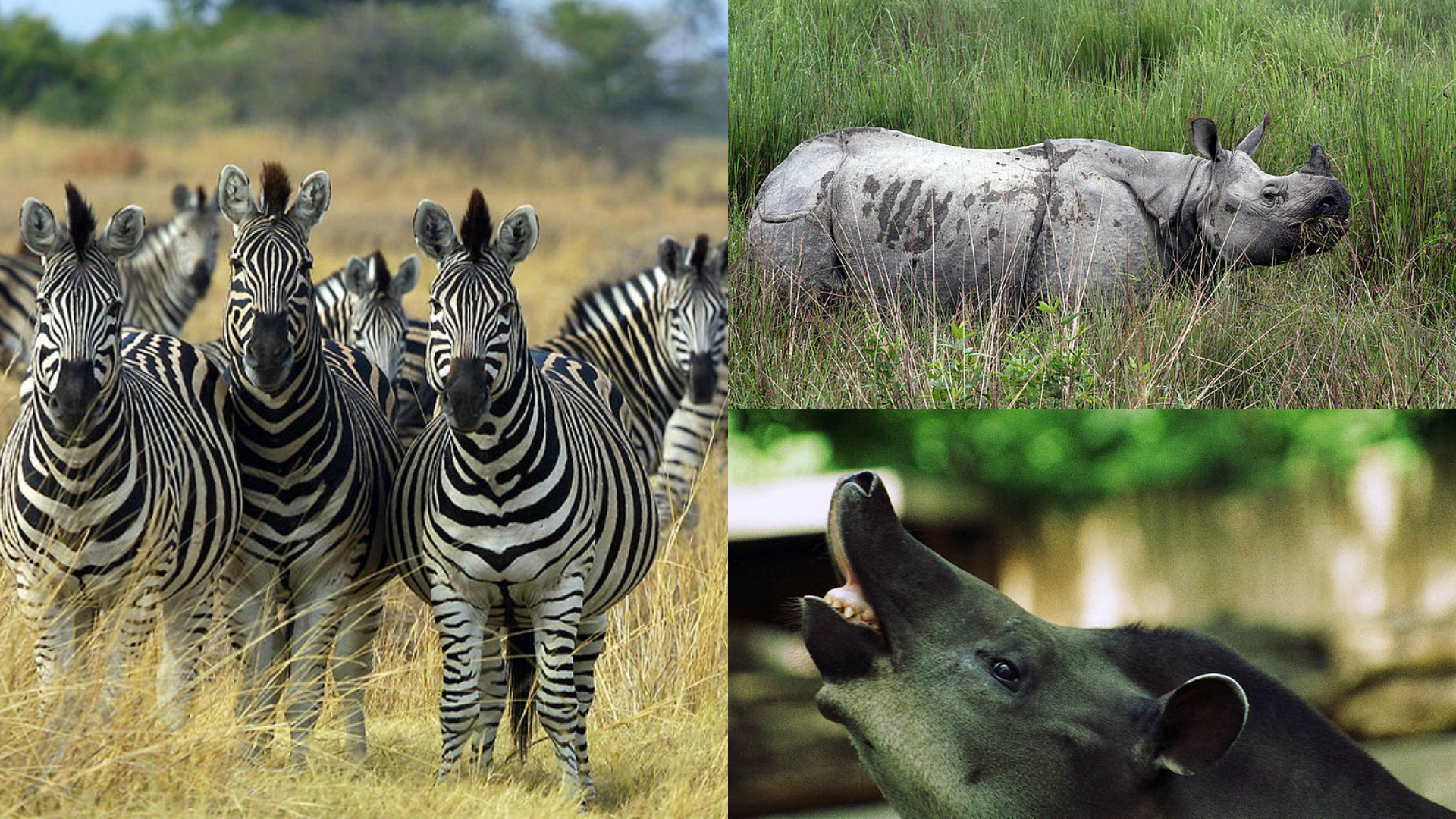
- Clockwise from left: plains zebra (Equus quagga), Indian rhinoceros (Rhinoceros unicornis) and Brazilian tapir (Tapirus terrestris)

Scientific classification
- Kingdom: Animalia
- Phylum: Chordata
- Class: Mammalia
- Clade: Perissodactylamorpha
- Order: Perissodactyla; Owen, 1848

Families
- †Brontotheriidae; †Lambdotheriidae*; Hippomorpha; Equoidea; Equidae; †Palaeotheriidae; Tapiromorpha; †Isectolophidae; †Ancylopoda; †Chalicotherioidea; †Chalicotheriidae; †Eomoropidae; †Lophiodontidae; Ceratomorpha; †Rhodopagidae; Tapiroidea; †Deperetellidae; †Helaletidae; †Lophialetidae; Tapiridae; Rhinocerotoidea; †Amynodontidae; †Hyracodontidae; †Paraceratheriidae; †Eggysodontidae*; †Forstercooperiidae*; Rhinocerotidae; * = family status disputed

= Perissodactyla =

Perissodactyla Temporal range: 56–0 Ma Latest Paleocene–present

Order of hoofed mammals

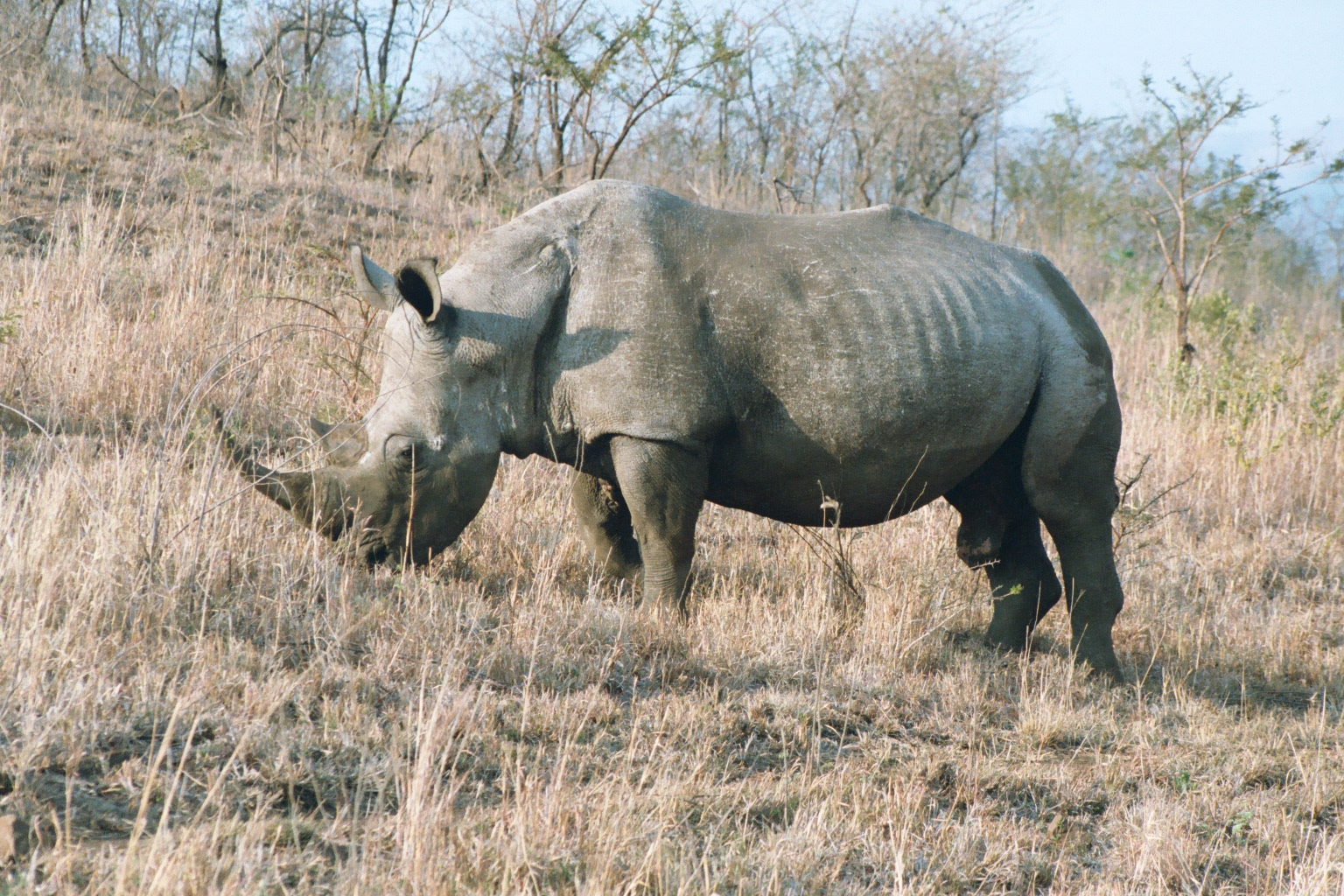
The white rhinoceros is the largest living perissodactyl

Perissodactyla (/pəˌrɪsoʊˈdæktɪlə/, from Ancient Greek περισσός, perissós 'odd' and δάκτυλος, dáktylos 'finger, toe'), or odd-toed ungulates, is an order of ungulates. The order includes about 17 living species divided into three families: Equidae (horses, asses, and zebras), Rhinocerotidae (rhinoceroses), and Tapiridae (tapirs). They typically have reduced the weight-bearing toes to three or one of the five original toes, though tapirs retain four toes on their front feet. The nonweight-bearing toes are either present, absent, vestigial, or positioned posteriorly. By contrast, artiodactyls (even-toed ungulates) bear most of their weight equally on four or two (an even number) of the five toes: their third and fourth toes. Another difference between the two is that perissodactyls digest plant cellulose in their intestines, rather than in one or more stomach chambers as artiodactyls, with the exception of Suina, do.

The order was considerably more diverse in the past, with notable extinct groups including the brontotheres, palaeotheres, chalicotheres, and the paraceratheres, with the paraceratheres including the largest known land mammals to have ever existed.

Despite their very different appearances, they were recognized as related families in the 19th century by the zoologist Richard Owen, who also coined the order's name.

== Anatomy ==
The largest odd-toed ungulates are rhinoceroses, and the extinct Paraceratherium, a hornless rhinocerotoid from the Oligocene, is considered one of the largest land mammals of all time, with P. transouralicum estimated to be 15-20 tonnes at maximum size with estimates as low as 11 tonnes on average. Though an unknown species of the related Dzungariotherium may be slightly larger, being estimated at 20.6 tonnes in weight. At the other extreme, an early member of the order, the prehistoric horse Eohippus, had a withers height of only 30 to 60 cm (12 to 24 in). Apart from dwarf varieties of the domestic horse and donkey, living perissodactyls reach a body length of 180–420 cm (71–165 in) and a weight of 150 to 4,500 kg (330 to 9,920 lb). While rhinos have only sparse hair and exhibit a thick epidermis, tapirs and horses have dense, short coats. Most species are grey or brown, although zebras and young tapirs are striped.

=== Limbs ===
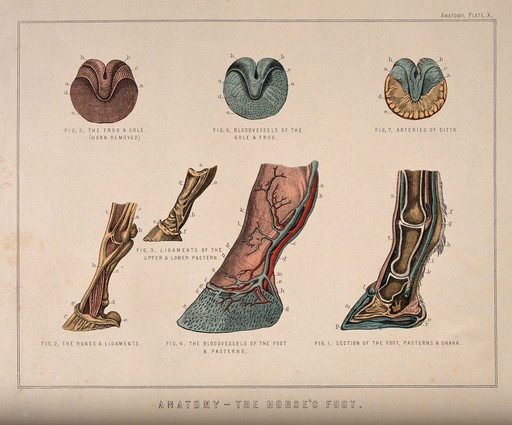
Seven figures showing the bones, blood vessels, ligaments and arteries of the hoof and pastern of the horse.

The main axes of both the front and rear feet pass through the third toe, which is always the largest. The remaining toes have been reduced in size to varying degrees. Tapirs, which are adapted to walking on soft ground, have four toes on their fore feet and three on their hind feet. Living rhinos have three toes on both the front and hind feet. Modern equines possess only a single toe; however, their feet are equipped with hooves, which almost completely cover the toe. Rhinos and tapirs, by contrast, have hooves covering only the leading edge of the toes, with the bottom being soft.

Ungulates have stances that require them to stand on the tips of their toes. Equine ungulates with only one digit or hoof have decreased mobility in their limbs, which allows for faster running speeds and agility. Differences in limb structure and physiology between ungulates and other mammals can be seen in the shape of the humerus. For example, often shorter, thicker, bones belong to the largest and heaviest ungulates like the rhinoceros.

The ulnae and fibulae are reduced in horses. A common feature that clearly distinguishes this group from other mammals is the articulation between the astragalus, the scaphoid and the cuboid, which greatly restricts the mobility of the foot. The thigh is relatively short, and the clavicle is absent.

=== Skull and teeth ===
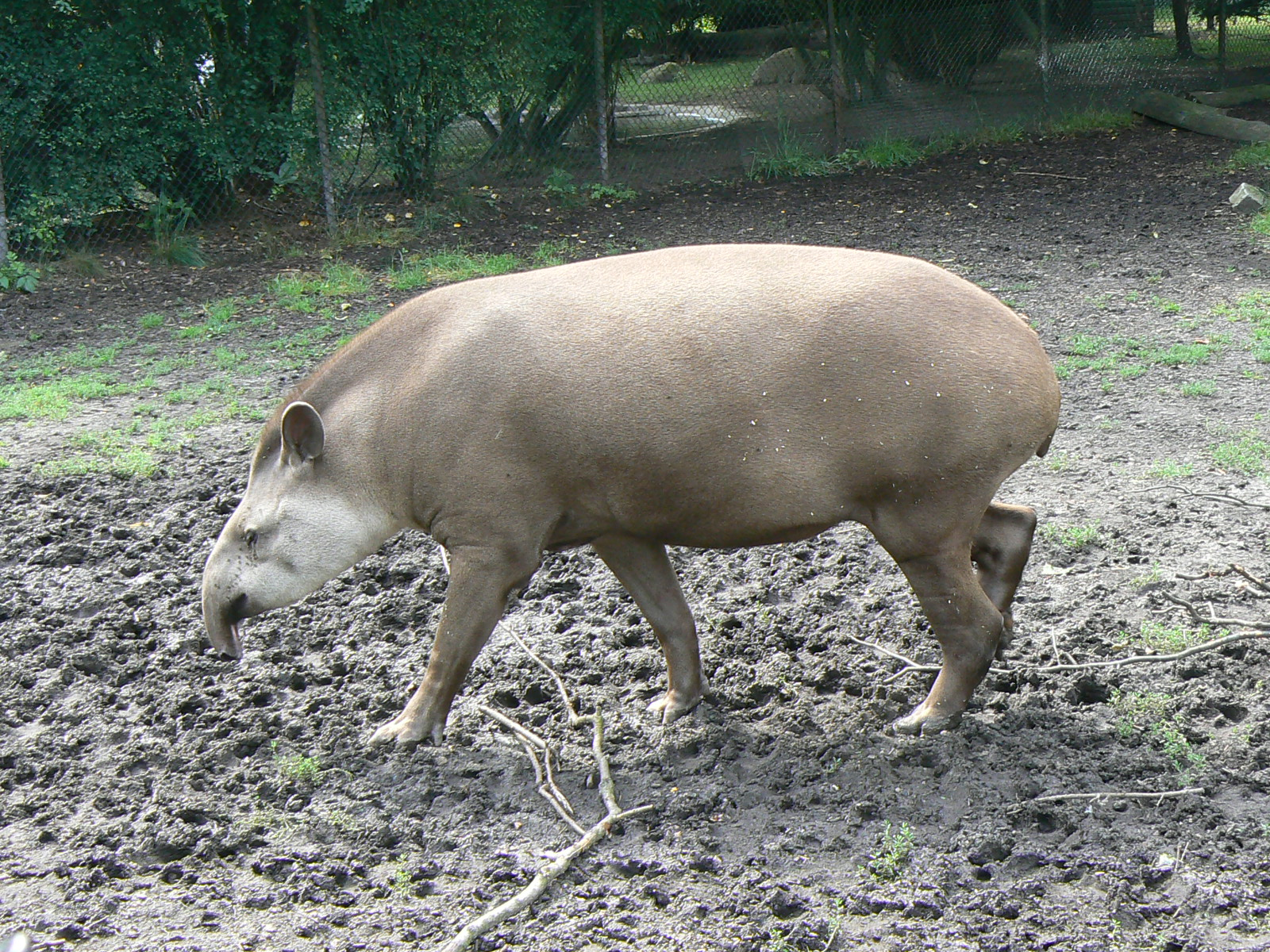
Tapirs are the only extant group of perissodactyls with a trunk.

Odd-toed ungulates have a long upper jaw with an extended diastema between the front and cheek teeth, giving them an elongated head. The various forms of snout between families are due to differences in the form of the premaxilla. The lacrimal bone has projecting cusps in the eye sockets and a wide contact with the nasal bone. The temporomandibular joint is high and the mandible is enlarged.

Rhinos have one or two horns made of agglutinated keratin, unlike the horns of even-toed ungulates (Bovidae and pronghorn), which have a bony core.

The number and form of the teeth vary according to diet. The incisors and canines can be very small or completely absent, as in the two African species of rhinoceros. In horses, usually only the males possess canines. The surface shape and height of the molars is heavily dependent on whether soft leaves or hard grass make up the main component of their diets. Three or four cheek teeth are present on each jaw half, so the dental formula of odd-toed ungulates is: 0-3 . 0-1 . 2-4 . 31-3 . 1 . 2-4 . 3 × 2 = 30-44

The guttural pouch, a small outpocketing of the auditory tube that drains the middle ear, is a characteristic feature of Perissodactyla. The guttural pouch is of particular concern in equine veterinary practice, due to its frequent involvement in some serious infections. Aspergillosis (infection with Aspergillus mould) of the guttural pouch (also called guttural pouch mycosis) can cause serious damage to the tissues of the pouch, as well as surrounding structures including important cranial nerves (nerves IX-XII: glossopharyngeal, vagus, accessory and hypoglossal nerves) and the internal carotid artery. Strangles (Streptococcus equi equi infection) is a highly transmissible respiratory infection of horses that can cause pus to accumulate in the guttural pouch; horses with S. equi equi colonising their guttural pouch can continue to intermittently shed the bacteria for several months, and should be isolated from other horses during this time to prevent transmission. Due to the intermittent nature of S. equi equi shedding, prematurely reintroducing an infected horse may risk exposing other horses to the infection, even though the shedding horse appears well and may have previously returned negative samples. The function of the guttural pouch has been difficult to determine, but it is now believed to play a role in cooling blood in the internal carotid artery before it enters the brain.

=== Gut ===
All perissodactyls are hindgut fermenters. In contrast to ruminants, hindgut fermenters store digested food that has left the stomach in an enlarged cecum, where the food begins digestion by microbes, with the fermentation continuing in the large colon. No gallbladder is present. The stomach of perissodactyls is simply built, while the cecum accommodates up to 90 L (24 US gal) in horses. The small intestine is very long, reaching up to 26 m (85 ft) in horses. Extraction of nutrients from food is relatively inefficient, which probably explains why no odd-toed ungulates are small; nutritional requirements per unit of body weight are lower for large animals, as their surface-area-to-volume ratio is smaller.

=== Lack of carotid rete ===
Unlike artiodactyls, perissodactyls lack a carotid rete, a heat exchange that reduces the dependence of the temperature of the brain on that of the body. As a result, perissodactyls have limited thermoregulatory flexibility compared to artiodactyls which has restricted them to habitats of low seasonality and rich in food and water, such as tropical forests. In contrast, artiodactyls occupy a wide range of habitats ranging from the Arctic Circle to deserts and tropical savannahs.

== Distribution ==
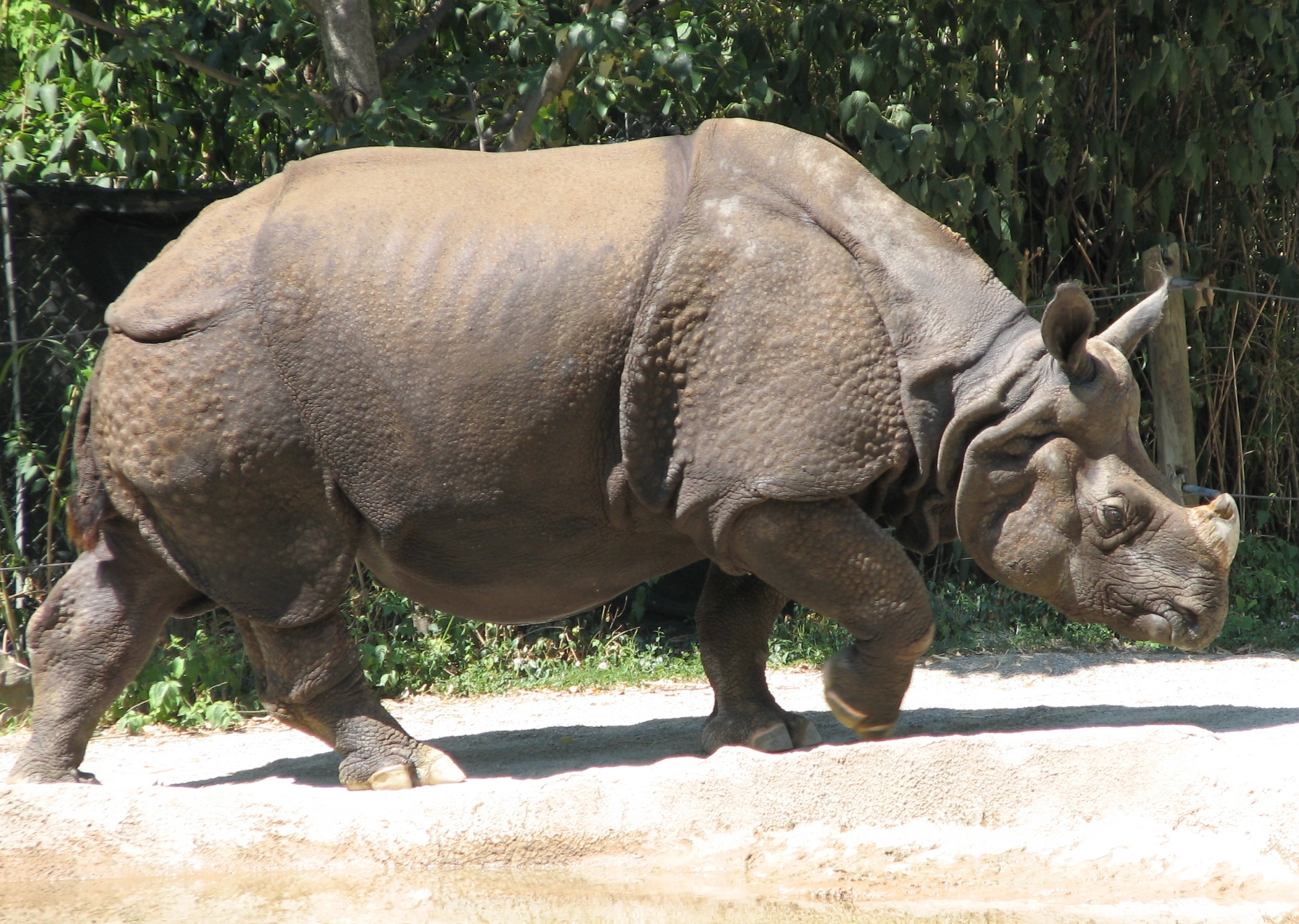
Restriction of their habitat and poaching threaten the survival of most rhino species, including the Indian rhinoceros shown here

Most extant perissodactyl species occupy a small fraction of their original range. Members of this group are now found only in Central and South America, eastern and southern Africa, and central, southern, and southeastern Asia. During the peak of odd-toed ungulate existence, from the Eocene to the Oligocene, perissodactyls were distributed over much of the globe, the major exceptions being Australia and Antarctica. Horses and tapirs arrived in South America after the formation of the Isthmus of Panama around 3 million years ago in the Pliocene. Their North American counterparts died out around 10,000 years ago, leaving only Baird's tapir with a range extending to what is now southern Mexico. The tarpans were pushed to extinction in 19th century Europe. Hunting and habitat destruction have reduced the surviving perissodactyl species to fragmented populations. In contrast, domesticated horses and donkeys have gained a worldwide distribution, and feral animals of both species are now also found in regions outside their original range, such as in Australia.

== Lifestyle and diet ==
Perissodactyls inhabit a number of different habitats, leading to different lifestyles. Tapirs are solitary and inhabit mainly tropical rainforests. In Africa, rhinos tend to live alone in savannas, forests, open woodland bush or scrub. In Asia, rhinos tend to live in wet marsh or forest areas. Horses, asses and zebras (members of the genus Equus) inhabit open areas such as grasslands, steppes, or semi-deserts, and live together in groups. Odd-toed ungulates are exclusively herbivores that feed, to varying degrees, on grass, leaves, and other plant parts. A distinction is often made between primarily grass feeders (white rhinos, equines) and leaf feeders (tapirs, other rhinos).

== Reproduction and development ==
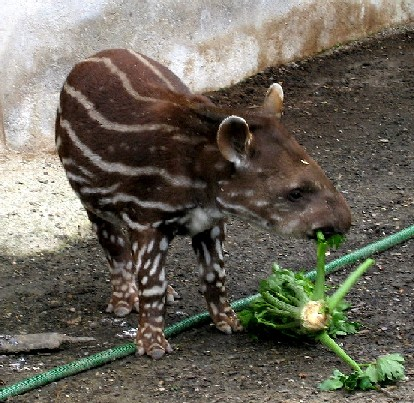
A young Brazilian tapir

Odd-toed ungulates are characterized by a long gestation period and a small litter size, usually delivering a single young. The gestation period is 330–500 days, being longest in rhinos. Newborn perissodactyls are precocial, meaning offspring are born already quite independent: for example, young horses can begin to follow the mother after a few hours. The young are nursed for a relatively long time, often into their second year, with rhinos reaching sexual maturity around eight or ten years old, but horses and tapirs maturing around two to four years old. Perissodactyls are long-lived, with several species, such as rhinos, reaching an age of almost 50 years in captivity.

== Taxonomy ==
=== Outer taxonomy ===
Traditionally, the odd-toed ungulates were classified with other mammals such as artiodactyls, hyraxes, elephants and other "ungulates". A close family relationship with hyraxes was suspected based on similarities in the construction of the ear and the course of the carotid artery.

Molecular genetic studies, however, have shown the ungulates to be polyphyletic, meaning that in some cases the similarities are the result of convergent evolution rather than common ancestry. Elephants and hyraxes are now considered to belong to Afrotheria, so are not closely related to the perissodactyls. These in turn are in the Laurasiatheria, a superorder that had its origin in the former supercontinent Laurasia. Molecular genetic findings suggest that the cloven Artiodactyla (containing the cetaceans as a deeply nested subclade) are the sister taxon of the Perissodactyla; together, the two groups form the Euungulata. More distant are the bats (Chiroptera) and Ferae (a common taxon of carnivorans, Carnivora, and pangolins, Pholidota). In a discredited alternative scenario, a close relationship exists between perissodactyls, carnivorans, and bats, this assembly comprising the Pegasoferae.

Internal taxonomy of the Euungulata after Welker et al. 2015

- Euungulata
  - Artiodactyla (Even-toed ungulates and cetaceans)
  - Panperissodactyla
    - Perissodactyla(Odd-toed ungulates)
    - † Meridiungulata (South American ungulates,
      especially Notoungulata and Litopterna)

According to studies published in March 2015, odd-toed ungulates are in a close family relationship with at least some of the so-called Meridiungulata, a very diverse group of mammals living from the Paleocene to the Pleistocene in South America, whose systematic unity is largely unexplained. Some of these were classified based on their paleogeographic distribution. However, a close relationship can be worked out to perissodactyls by protein sequencing and comparison with fossil collagen from remnants of phylogenetically young members of the Meridiungulata (specifically Macrauchenia from the Litopterna and Toxodon from the Notoungulata). Both kinship groups, the odd-toed ungulates and the Litopterna-Notoungulata, are now in the higher-level taxon of Panperissodactyla. This kinship group is included among the Euungulata, which also contains the even-toed ungulates (Artiodactyla). The separation of the Litopterna-Notoungulata group from the perissodactyls probably took place before the Cretaceous–Paleogene extinction event. "Condylarths" can probably be considered the starting point for the development of the two groups, as they represent a heterogeneous group of primitive ungulates that mainly inhabited the northern hemisphere in the Paleogene.

=== Modern members ===
Odd-toed ungulates comprise three living families with around 17 species—in horses, however, the exact count is still controversial. Rhinos and tapirs are more closely related to each other than to horses. According to molecular genetic analysis, the separation of horses from other perissodactyls took place in the Paleocene some 56 million years ago, while the rhinos and tapirs split off in the lower-middle Eocene, about 47 million years ago.

Internal relationships of extant Perissodactyla

- Perissodactyla
  - - Equidae
      - Equus ferus
      - - Equus asinus
        - - - Equus hemionus
            - Equus kiang
          - - Equus zebra
            - - Equus grevyi
              - Equus quagga
    - - Tapiridae
        - Tapirus indicus
        - - Tapirus bairdii
          - - Tapirus kabomani
            - - Tapirus pinchaque
              - Tapirus terrestris
      - Rhinocerotidae
        - - Ceratotherium simum
          - Diceros bicornis
        - - Dicerorhinus sumatrensis
          - - Rhinoceros sondaicus
            - Rhinoceros unicornis

- Order Perissodactyla
  - Suborder Hippomorpha
    - Family Equidae: horses and allies, seven species in one genus
      - Wild horse, Equus ferus
        - Tarpan, †Equus ferus ferus
        - Przewalski's horse, Equus ferus przewalskii
        - Domestic horse, Equus ferus caballus
      - African wild ass, Equus africanus
        - Nubian wild ass, Equus africanus africanus
        - Somali wild ass, Equus africanus somaliensis
        - Domesticated ass (donkey), Equus africanus asinus
        - Atlas wild ass, †Equus africanus atlanticus
      - Onager or Asiatic wild ass, Equus hemionus
        - Mongolian wild ass, Equus hemionus hemionus
        - Turkmenian kulan, Equus hemionus kulan
        - Persian onager, Equus hemionus onager
        - Indian wild ass, Equus hemionus khur
        - Syrian wild ass, †Equus hemionus hemippus
      - Kiang or Tibetan wild ass, Equus kiang
        - Western kiang, Equus kiang kiang
        - Eastern kiang, Equus kiang holdereri
        - Southern kiang, Equus kiang polyodon
      - Plains zebra, Equus quagga
        - Quagga, †Equus quagga quagga
        - Burchell's zebra, Equus quagga burchellii
        - Grant's zebra, Equus quagga boehmi
        - Maneless zebra, Equus quagga borensis
        - Chapman's zebra, Equus quagga chapmani
        - Crawshay's zebra, Equus quagga crawshayi
        - Selous' zebra, Equus quagga selousi
      - Mountain zebra, Equus zebra
        - Cape mountain zebra, Equus zebra zebra
        - Hartmann's mountain zebra, Equus zebra hartmannae
      - Grévy's zebra, Equus grevyi
  - Suborder Ceratomorpha
    - Family Tapiridae: tapirs, five species in one genus
      - Brazilian tapir, Tapirus terrestris
      - Mountain tapir, Tapirus pinchaque
      - Baird's tapir, Tapirus bairdii
      - Malayan tapir, Tapirus indicus
      - Kabomani tapir, Tapirus kabomani
    - Family Rhinocerotidae: rhinoceroses, five species in four genera
      - Black rhinoceros, Diceros bicornis
        - Southern black rhinoceros, †Diceros bicornis bicornis
        - North-eastern black rhinoceros, †Diceros bicornis brucii
        - Chobe black rhinoceros, Diceros bicornis chobiensis
        - Uganda black rhinoceros, Diceros bicornis ladoensis
        - Western black rhinoceros, †Diceros bicornis longipes
        - Eastern black rhinoceros, Diceros bicornis michaeli
        - South-central black rhinoceros, Diceros bicornis minor
        - South-western black rhinoceros, Diceros bicornis occidentalis
      - White rhinoceros, Ceratotherium simum
        - Southern white rhinoceros, Ceratotherium simum simum
        - Northern white rhinoceros, Ceratotherium simum cottoni
      - Indian rhinoceros, Rhinoceros unicornis
      - Javan rhinoceros, Rhinoceros sondaicus
        - Indonesian Javan rhinoceros, Rhinoceros sondaicus sondaicus
        - Vietnamese Javan rhinoceros, Rhinoceros sondaicus annamiticus
        - Indian Javan rhinoceros, †Rhinoceros sondaicus inermis
      - Sumatran rhinoceros, Dicerorhinus sumatrensis
        - Western Sumatran rhinoceros, Dicerorhinus sumatrensis sumatrensis
        - Eastern Sumatran rhinoceros, Dicerorhinus sumatrensis harrissoni
        - Northern Sumatran rhinoceros, †Dicerorhinus sumatrensis lasiotis

=== Prehistoric members ===
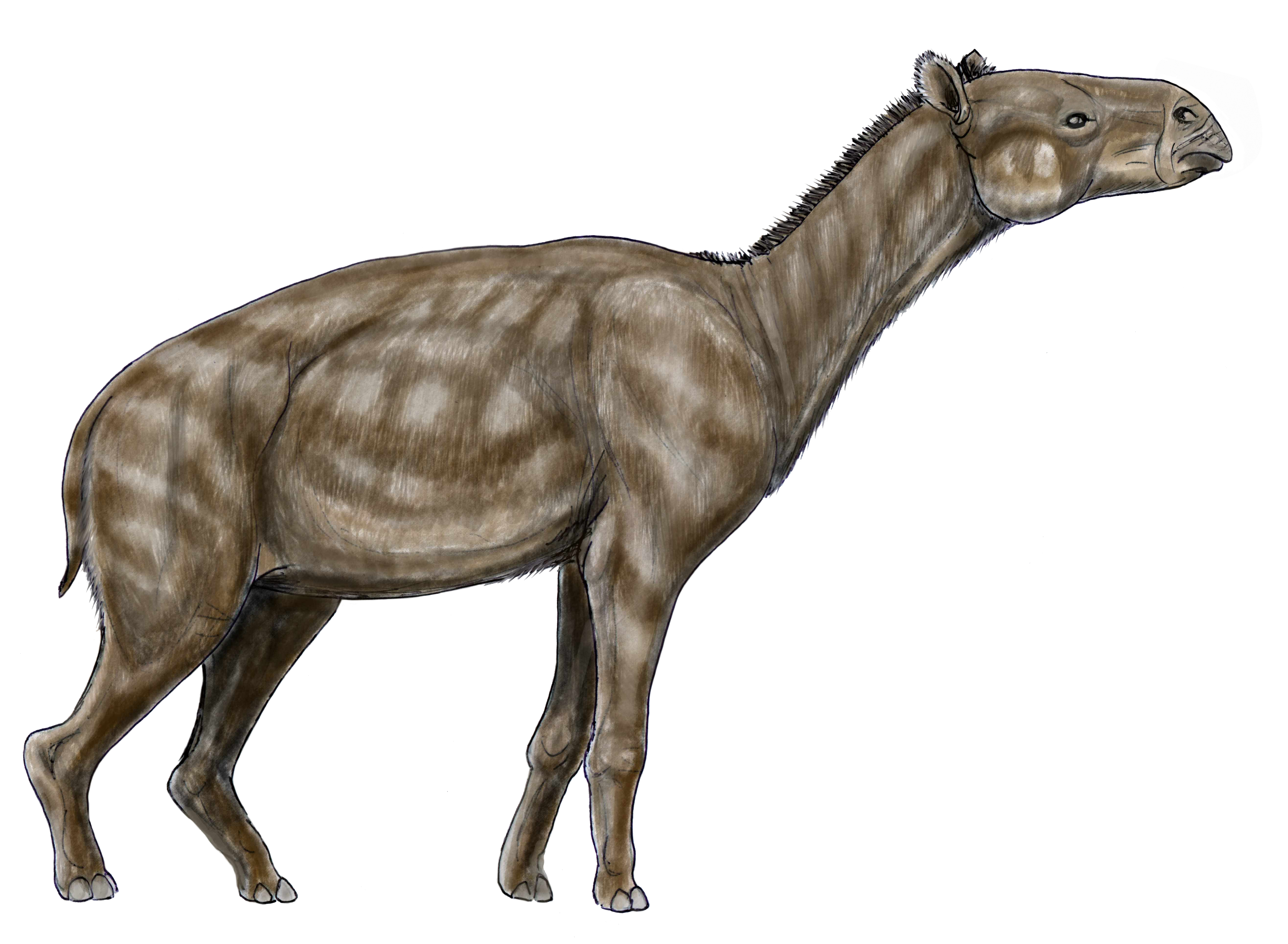
Restoration of Palaeotherium, a palaeothere genus first formally described in 1804

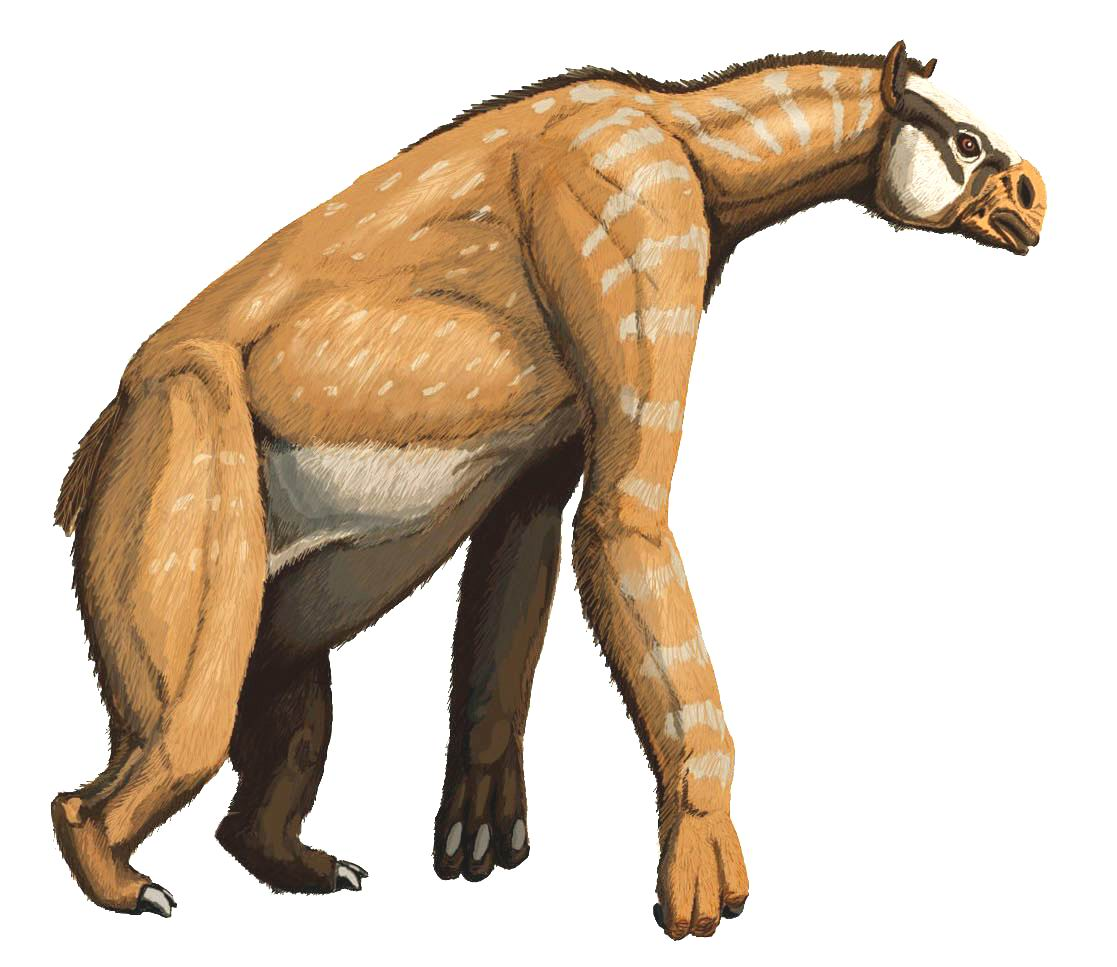
Live reconstruction of chalicothere Anisodon grande (formerly Chalicotherium grande)

There are many perissodactyl fossils of multivariant form. The major lines of development include the following groups:

- Scale diagram of the paraceratheriid Paraceratherium, one of the largest land mammals to have ever existed
  Brontotheriidae were among the earliest known large mammals. They were generally characterized in their late phase (infratribe Brontotheriina) by a bony horn at the transition from the nose to the frontal bone and flat molars suitable for chewing soft plant food. The Brontotheriidae, which were almost exclusively confined to North America and Asia, died out at the beginning of the Upper Eocene.
- Equoidea also developed in the Eocene. Palaeotheriidae are known mainly from Europe. In contrast, the horse family (Equidae) flourished and spread. Over time this group saw a reduction in toe number, extension of the limbs, and the progressive adjustment of the teeth for eating hard grasses.
- Chalicotherioidea represented another characteristic group, consisting of the families Chalicotheriidae and Lophiodontidae. The Chalicotheriidae developed claws instead of hooves and considerable extension of the forelegs. The best-known genera include Chalicotherium and Moropus. Chalicotherioidea died out in the Pleistocene.
- Rhinocerotoidea (rhino relatives) included a large variety of forms from the Eocene up to the Oligocene, including dog-size leaf feeders, semiaquatic animals, and also huge long-necked animals. Only a few had horns on the nose. The Amynodontidae were hippo-like, aquatic animals. Hyracodontidae developed long limbs and long necks that were most pronounced in the Paraceratherium (formerly known as Baluchitherium or Indricotherium), the second largest known land mammal ever to have lived (after Palaeoloxodon namadicus). The rhinos (Rhinocerotidae) emerged in the Middle Eocene; five species survive to the present day.
- Tapiroidea reached their greatest diversity in the Eocene, when several families lived in Eurasia and North America. They retained a primitive physique and were noted for developing a trunk. The extinct families within this group include the Helaletidae.
- Several mammal groups traditionally classified as condylarths, long-understood to be a wastebasket taxon, such as hyopsodontids and phenacodontids, are now understood to be part of the odd-toed ungulate assemblage. Phenacodontids seem to be stem-perissodactyls, while hyopsodontids are closely related to horses and brontotheres, despite their more primitive overall appearance.
- Desmostylia and Anthracobunidae have traditionally been placed among the afrotheres, but they may actually represent stem-perissodactyls. They are an early lineage of mammals that took to the water, spreading across semi-aquatic to fully marine niches in the Tethys Ocean and the northern Pacific. However, later studies have shown that, while anthracobunids are definite perissodactyls, desmostylians have enough mixed characters to suggest that a position among the Afrotheria is not out of the question.
- Order Perissodactyla
  - †Brontotheriidae
  - †Lambdotheriidae (paraphyletic?)
  - Suborder Hippomorpha
    - Superfamily Equoidea
      - †Palaeotheriidae (might be a basal perissodactyl grade instead)
  - Clade Tapiromorpha
    - †Isectolophidae (a basal family of Tapiromorpha; from the Eocene epoch)
    - †Suborder Ancylopoda
      - †Lophiodontidae
      - Superfamily Chalicotherioidea
        - †Eomoropidae (basal grade of chalicotheroids)
        - †Chalicotheriidae
    - Suborder Ceratomorpha
      - †Rhodopagidae
      - Superfamily Rhinocerotoidea
        - †Amynodontidae
        - †Eggysodontidae? (or a subfamily of hyracodonts)
        - †Forstercooperiidae? (or a subfamily of paraceratheres)
        - †Hyracodontidae
        - †Paraceratheriidae
      - Superfamily Tapiroidea
        - †Deperetellidae
        - †Helaletidae
        - †Lophialetidae
  - †Anthracobunidae (a family of stem-perissodactyls; from the Early to Middle Eocene epoch)
  - †Phenacodontidae (a clade of stem-perissodactyls; from the Early Palaeocene to the Middle Eocene epoch)

=== Higher classification of perissodactyls ===
Relationships within the large group of odd-toed ungulates are not fully understood. Initially, after the establishment of "Perissodactyla" by Richard Owen in 1848, the present-day representatives were considered equal in rank. In the first half of the 20th century, a more systematic differentiation of odd-toed ungulates began, based on a consideration of fossil forms, and they were placed in two major suborders: Hippomorpha and Ceratomorpha. The Hippomorpha comprises today's horses and their extinct members (Equoidea); the Ceratomorpha consist of tapirs and rhinos plus their extinct members (Tapiroidea and Rhinocerotoidea). The names Hippomorpha and Ceratomorpha were introduced in 1937 by Horace Elmer Wood, in response to criticism of the name "Solidungula" that he proposed three years previously. It had been based on the grouping of horses and Tridactyla and on the rhinoceros/tapir complex. The extinct brontotheriidae were also classified under Hippomorpha and therefore possess a close relationship to horses. Some researchers accept this assignment because of similar dental features, but there is also the view that a very basal position within the odd-toed ungulates places them rather in the group of Titanotheriomorpha.

Originally, the Chalicotheriidae were seen as members of Hippomorpha, and presented as such in 1941. William Berryman Scott thought that, as claw-bearing perissodactyls, they belong in the new suborder Ancylopoda (where Ceratomorpha and Hippomorpha as odd-toed ungulates were combined in the group of Chelopoda). The term Ancylopoda, coined by Edward Drinker Cope in 1889, had been established for chalicotheres. However, further morphological studies from the 1960s showed a middle position of Ancylopoda between Hippomorpha and Ceratomorpha. Leonard Burton Radinsky saw all three major groups of odd-toed ungulates as peers, based on the extremely long and independent phylogenetic development of the three lines. In the 1980s, Jeremy J. Hooker saw a general similarity between Ancylopoda and Ceratomorpha based on dentition, especially in the earliest members, leading to the unification in 1984 of the two submissions in the interim order, Tapiromorpha. At the same time, he expanded the Ancylopoda to include the Lophiodontidae. The name "Tapiromorpha" goes back to Ernst Haeckel, who coined it in 1873, but it was long considered synonymous to Ceratomorpha because Wood had not considered it in 1937 when Ceratomorpha were named, since the term had been used quite differently in the past. Also in 1984, Robert M. Schoch used the conceptually similar term Moropomorpha, which today applies synonymously to Tapiromorpha. Included within the Tapiromorpha are the now extinct Isectolophidae, a sister group of the Ancylopoda-Ceratomorpha group and thus the most primitive members of this relationship complex.

== Evolutionary history ==
=== Origins ===
The evolutionary development of Perissodactyla is well documented in the fossil record. Numerous finds are evidence of the adaptive radiation of this group, which was once much more varied and widely dispersed. Radinskya from the late Paleocene of East Asia is often considered to be one of the oldest close relatives of the ungulates. Its 8 cm skull must have belonged to a very small and primitive animal with a π-shaped crown pattern on the enamel of its rear molars similar to that of perissodactyls and their relatives, especially the rhinos. Finds of Cambaytherium and Kalitherium in the Cambay shale of western India indicate an origin in Asia dating to the Lower Eocene roughly 54.5 million years ago. Their teeth also show similarities to Radinskya as well as to the Tethytheria clade. The saddle-shaped configuration of the navicular joints and the mesaxonic construction of the front and hind feet also indicates a close relationship to Tethytheria. However, this construction deviates from that of Cambaytherium, indicating that it is actually a member of a sister group. Ancestors of Perissodactyla may have arrived via an island bridge from the Afro-Arab landmass onto the Indian subcontinent as it drifted north towards Asia. A study on Cambaytherium suggests an origin in India prior or near its collision with Asia.

The alignment of hyopsodontids and phenacodontids to Perissodactyla in general suggests an older Laurasian origin and distribution for the clade, dispersed across the northern continents already in the early Paleocene. These forms already show a fairly well-developed molar morphology, with no intermediary forms as evidence of the course of its development. The close relationship between meridiungulate mammals and perissoodactyls in particular is of interest since the latter appeared in South America soon after the K–T event, implying rapid ecological radiation and dispersal after mass extinction.

=== Phylogeny ===
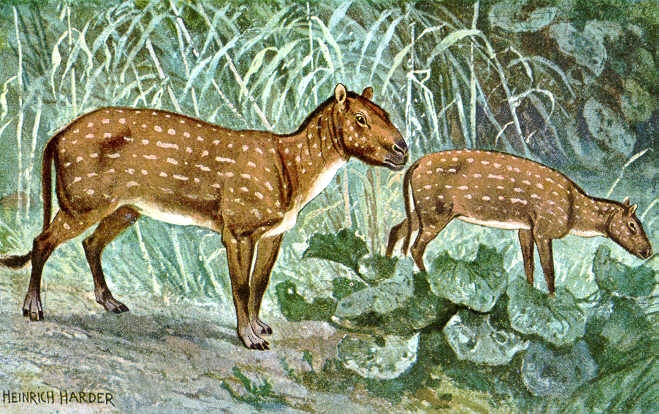
Eohippus, an early relative of the horse, is one of the oldest-known perissodactyls

The Perissodactyla appeared relatively abruptly at the beginning of the Lower Paleocene about 63 million years ago, both in North America and Asia, in the form of phenacodontids and hyopsodontids. The oldest finds from an extant group originate among other sources, from Sifrhippus, an ancestor of the horses from the Willswood lineup in northwestern Wyoming. The distant ancestors of tapirs appeared not too long after that in the Ghazij lineup in Balochistan, such as Ganderalophus, as well as Litolophus from the Chalicotheriidae line, or Eotitanops from the group of brontotheriidae. Initially, the members of the different lineages looked quite similar, with an arched back and generally four toes on the front and three on the hind feet. Eohippus, which is considered a member of the horse family, outwardly resembled Hyrachyus, the first representative of the rhino and tapir line. All were small compared to later forms and lived as fruit and foliage eaters in forests. The first of the megafauna to emerge were the brontotheres, in the Middle and Upper Eocene. Megacerops, known from North America, reached a withers height of 2.5 m (8 ft 2 in) and could have weighed just over 3 metric tons (3.3 short tons). The decline of brontotheres at the end of the Eocene is associated with competition arising from the advent of more successful herbivores.

More successful lines of odd-toed ungulates emerged at the end of the Eocene when dense jungles gave way to steppe, such as the chalicotheriid rhinos, and their immediate relatives; their development also began with very small forms. Paraceratherium, one of the largest mammals ever to walk the earth, evolved during this era. They weighed up to 20 metric tons (22 short tons) and lived throughout the Oligocene in Eurasia. About 20 million years ago, at the onset of the Miocene, the perissodactyls first reached Africa when it became connected to Eurasia because of the closing of the Tethys Ocean. For the same reason, however, new animals such as the mammoths also entered the ancient settlement areas of odd-toed ungulates, creating competition that led to the extinction of some of their lines. The rise of ruminants, which occupied similar ecological niches and had a much more efficient digestive system, is also associated with the decline in diversity of odd-toed ungulates. A significant cause for the decline of perissodactyls was climate change during the Miocene, leading to a cooler and drier climate accompanied by the spread of open landscapes. However, some lines flourished, such as the horses and rhinos; anatomical adaptations made it possible for them to consume tougher grass food. This led to open land forms that dominated newly created landscapes. With the emergence of the Isthmus of Panama in the Pliocene, perissodactyls and other megafauna were given access to one of their last habitable continents: South America. However, many perissodactyls became extinct at the end of the ice ages, including American horses and the Elasmotherium. Whether over-hunting by humans (overkill hypothesis), climatic change, or a combination of both factors was responsible for the extinction of ice age mega-fauna, remains controversial.

== Research history ==
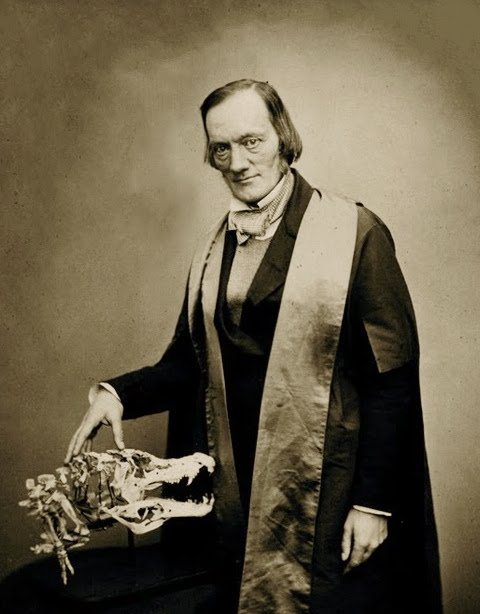
Richard Owen, 1856

In 1758, in his seminal work Systema Naturae, Linnaeus (1707–1778) classified horses (Equus) together with hippos (Hippopotamus). At that time, this category also included the tapirs (Tapirus), more precisely the lowland or South American tapir (Tapirus terrestus), the only tapir then known in Europe. Linnaeus classified this tapir as Hippopotamus terrestris and put both genera in the group of the Belluae ("beasts"). He combined the rhinos with the Glires, a group now consisting of the lagomorphs and rodents. Mathurin Jacques Brisson (1723–1806) first separated the tapirs and hippos in 1762 with the introduction of the concept le tapir. He also separated the rhinos from the rodents, but did not combine the three families now known as the odd-toed ungulates. In the transition to the 19th century, the individual perissodactyl genera were associated with various other groups, such as the proboscidean and even-toed ungulates. In 1795, Étienne Geoffroy Saint-Hilaire (1772–1844) and Georges Cuvier (1769–1832) introduced the term "pachyderm" (Pachydermata), including in it not only the rhinos and elephants, but also the hippos, pigs, peccaries, tapirs and hyrax. The horses were still generally regarded as a group separate from other mammals and were often classified under the name Solidungula or Solipèdes, meaning "one-hoof animal".

In 1861, Henri Marie Ducrotay de Blainville (1777–1850) classified ungulates by the structure of their feet, differentiating those with an even number of toes from those with an odd number. He moved the horses as solidungulate over to the tapirs and rhinos as multungulate animals and referred to all of them together as onguligrades à doigts impairs, coming close to the concept of the odd-toed ungulate as a systematic unit. Richard Owen (1804–1892) quoted Blainville in his study on fossil mammals of the Isle of Wight and introduced the name Perissodactyla.

In 1884, Othniel Charles Marsh (1831–1899) came up with the concept Mesaxonia, which he used for what are today called the odd-toed ungulates, including their extinct relatives, but explicitly excluding the hyrax. Mesaxonia is now considered a synonym of Perissodactyla, but it was sometimes also used for the true odd-toed ungulates as a subcategory (rhinos, horses, tapirs), while Perissodactyla stood for the entire order, including the hyrax. The assumption that hyraxes were Perissodactyla was held well into the 20th century. Only with the advent of molecular genetic research methods had it been recognized that the hyrax was not closely related to perissodactyls but rather to elephants and manatees.

== Interactions with humans ==
The domestic horse and the donkey play an important role in human history, particularly as transport, work and pack animals. The domestication of both species began several millennia BCE. Due to the motorisation of agriculture and the spread of automobile traffic, such use has declined sharply in Western industrial countries; riding is usually undertaken more as a hobby or sport. In less developed regions of the world, traditional uses for these animals are, however, still widespread. To a lesser extent, horses and donkeys are also kept for their meat and their milk.

In contrast, the existence in the wild of almost all other odd-toed ungulates species has declined dramatically because of hunting and habitat destruction. The quagga is extinct and Przewalski's horse was once eradicated in the wild.

Threat levels, according to the International Union for Conservation of Nature as of 2026:

- Four species are considered critically endangered: the Javan rhinoceros, the Sumatran rhinoceros, the black rhinoceros and the African wild ass.
- Five species are endangered: the mountain tapir, the Central American tapir, the Malayan tapir, the Przewalski's horse and Grévy's zebra.
- Three species are considered vulnerable: the Indian rhinoceros, the South American tapir and the mountain zebra.
- The onager, the plains zebra and the white rhinoceros are near-threatened; however, the northern subspecies, Ceratotherium simum cottoni (northern white rhinoceros) is close to extinction.
- The kiang is not considered at risk (least concern).

=== Conservation ===
Hunting and habitat loss due to land conversion and human encroachment are the most significant threats to the three endangered species of tapir. The Malayan tapir's inland forest habitat is of particular concern, as this land is being deforested rapidly and converted into palm oil plantations. Climate change is shifting the suitable range of mountain tapirs further up the Andes Mountains, reducing their available habitat. Hunting of mountain and Baird's tapirs in Central and South America for their meat is common and is made easier by climate change, as population densities are forcibly increased. Although hunting is illegal in protected areas throughout this region, regulations are often ignored or unenforced. Conservation efforts for tapirs primarily consist of legal protections from hunting and international trade, though proposals of habitat protection and restoration at the local level are underway in all affected countries.
