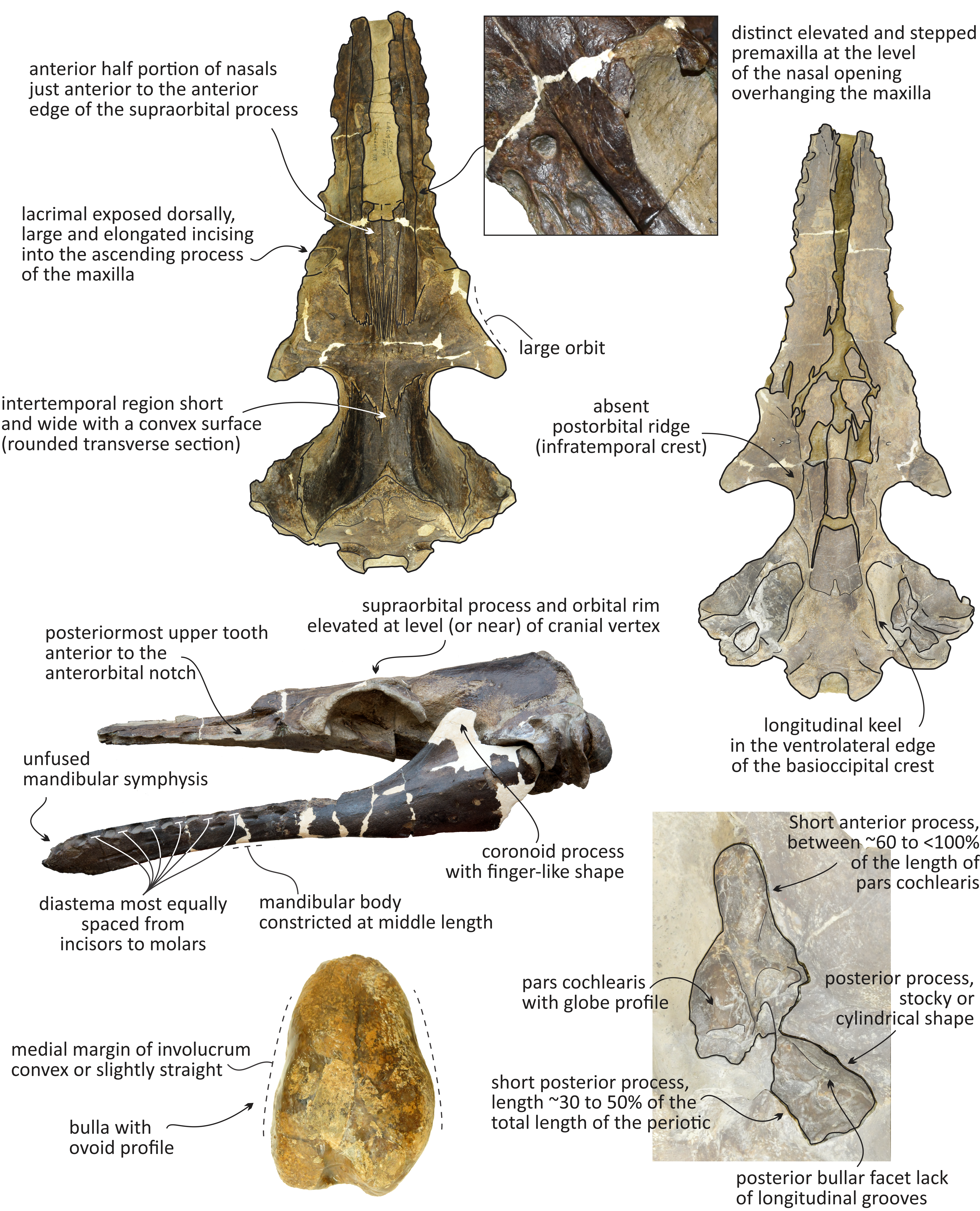
- Holotype skull of F. goedertorum

Scientific classification
- Kingdom: Animalia
- Phylum: Chordata
- Class: Mammalia
- Infraclass: Placentalia
- Order: Artiodactyla
- Infraorder: Cetacea
- Family: †Aetiocetidae
- Genus: †Fucaia; Marx, Tsai, and Fordyce, 2015

Type species
- †Fucaia buelli

Species
- †F. buelli; †F. goedertorum; †F. humilis

= Fucaia =

Fucaia Temporal range: Oligocene

Extinct genus of whale

Fucaia is an extinct genus of primitive baleen whale belonging to the family Aetiocetidae that is known from Oligocene and latest Eocene marine deposits on Vancouver Island, Canada, the Olympic Peninsula, Washington State, and Oregon.

== Taxonomy ==
Three species are now recognized; F. buelli, F. goedertorum (Barnes et al. 1995), and F. humilis. Fucaia humilis is latest Eocene in age and thus the oldest mysticete in the Northern Hemisphere, F. buelli is of early Oligocene (Rupelian) age, while F. goedertorum is younger. The latter was originally described as a species of Chonecetus before it was recognized as more closely related to buelli than to the Chonecetus type species.

== Palaeobiology ==
The tooth structure of Fucaia indicates that it was capable of both raptorial feeding and suction-feeding, like other aetiocetids. Analysis of the cranium and postcranium of F. goedertorum has confirmed that the species was a suction-assisted raptorial feeder.

== Sister taxa ==
- Aetiocetus
- Ashorocetus
- Chonecetus
- Morawanocetus
- Willungacetus
