= Morawan Formation =

- Stratigraphic range: Chattian
- Type: Formation
- Unit of: Kawakami Group
- Sub-units: unnamed, Kamirawan, Lower Hard Shale, Middle Hard Shales, Upper tuffaceous silstone
- Underlies: Kiroro Formation
- Overlies: Hombetsuzawa Formation
- Thickness: 500 m (1,600 ft)

Location
- Region: Hokkaido
- Country: Japan

The Morawan Formation is a Chattian age siliceous marine geological formation of the Oligo-Miocene Japanese Kawakami Group of eastern Hokkaido prefecture. The formation is fossil rich and contains source units where toothed baleen whales (Aetiocetidae) and Desmostylians have been discovered.

The Morawan Formation is a very siliceous unit containing hard platy shales interbedded with tuffaceous mudstones and sandstones, and some pumice. The unnamed lower member is a hard platy shale alternating with beds of tuffaceous mudstones and sandstones, the Kamirawan member is a tuffaceous sandstone with pumice, the Lower Hard Shale is a very siliceous hard shale with tuffaceous sandstones and mudstones, and the Middle Hard Shales and the Upper tuffaceous siltstone are similar.

Fossil species from the Morawan Formation include:

- Ashoroa laticosta
- Ashorocetus eguchii
- Behemotops katsuiei
- Morawanocetus yabukii
- Aetiocetus tomitai
- A. polydentatus
