= Salishicetus =

Salishicetus Temporal range: Late Oligocene-Early Miocene Chattian–Aquitanian

Scientific classification
- Kingdom: Animalia
- Phylum: Chordata
- Class: Mammalia
- Infraclass: Placentalia
- Order: Artiodactyla
- Infraorder: Cetacea
- Family: †Aetiocetidae
- Genus: †Salishicetus; Peredo and Pyenson, 2018
- Species: †S. meadi

Binomial name
- †Salishicetus meadi Peredo and Pyenson, 2018

Extinct genus of whales

Salishicetus is an extinct genus of aetiocetid baleen whale from the Late Oligocene discovered in Washington state with one species: S. meadi as well as partial material described as cf. S. sp. from the Late Oligocene or Early Miocene strata of the Vaqueros Formation in California. Like other ancient baleen whales, Salishicetus had teeth, and used these for either suction feeding or to catch large prey. The name refers to the Salish Sea, which it was found near, which itself honors the Salish tribes of the Pacific Northwest region.
