= Willungacetus =

Willungacetus Temporal range: Oligocene

Scientific classification
- Kingdom: Animalia
- Phylum: Chordata
- Class: Mammalia
- Order: Artiodactyla
- Infraorder: Cetacea
- Family: †Aetiocetidae (?)
- Genus: †Willungacetus; Pledge 2005

Species
- †W. aldingensis Pledge 2005

Extinct genus of mammals

Willungacetus is an extinct genus of primitive baleen whale of the family Aetiocetidae known from the Oligocene of Australia (at Port Willunga, 35.3°S 138.5°E, paleocoordinates 52.9°S 133.7°E). It is the oldest-known whale from Australia, and the only aetiocetid whale currently known from the Southern Hemisphere.

Neville S. Pledge first visited the type locality in 1983 and collected two boulders. These two rocks, however, were forgotten until 2001 when a partial vertebra were discovered within. The site was subsequently revisited and another specimen, a partial cranium, was discovered. Pledge referred a radius, collected from the same cliff in 1994, to his newly named species.

Pledge provisionally assigned Willungacetus to Aetiocetidae, but this assignment still needs to be confirmed.

== Sister taxa ==
- Aetiocetus
- Ashorocetus
- Chonecetus
- Morawanocetus
