= Isocetus =

Isocetus Temporal range: Langhian–Serravallian

Scientific classification
- Domain: Eukaryota
- Kingdom: Animalia
- Phylum: Chordata
- Class: Mammalia
- Order: Artiodactyla
- Infraorder: Cetacea
- Parvorder: Mysticeti
- Clade: †Thalassotherii
- Genus: †Isocetus van Beneden, 1880

Species
- I. depauwi van Beneden, 1880 (type)

Extinct genus of whales

Isocetus is an extinct genus of baleen whale belonging to the clade Thalassotherii. Remains have been found in middle Miocene marine deposits in Belgium.

== Description ==
Isocetus was considered a nomen dubium by Steeman (2010) but was treated as a distinct species by Bisconti et al. (2013) based on characters of the mandibular condyle and dentary. A complete thalassothere specimen from Belgium previously assigned to Isocetus depauwi by Abel (1938) is now the holotype of the species Parietobalaena campiniana.
