= Kaaucetus =

Kaaucetus Temporal range: Late Oligocene

Scientific classification
- Domain: Eukaryota
- Kingdom: Animalia
- Phylum: Chordata
- Class: Mammalia
- Order: Artiodactyla
- Suborder: Whippomorpha
- Infraorder: Cetacea
- Family: †Aetiocetidae
- Genus: †Kaaucetus
- Species: †K. thesaurus

Binomial name
- †Kaaucetus thesaurus Hernández-Cisneros, 2022

Extinct genus of cetaceans

Kaaucetus is an extinct genus of aetiocetid that inhabited what is now the coast of Mexico during the Chattian stage of the Oligocene epoch. It contains a single species, K. thesaurus.
