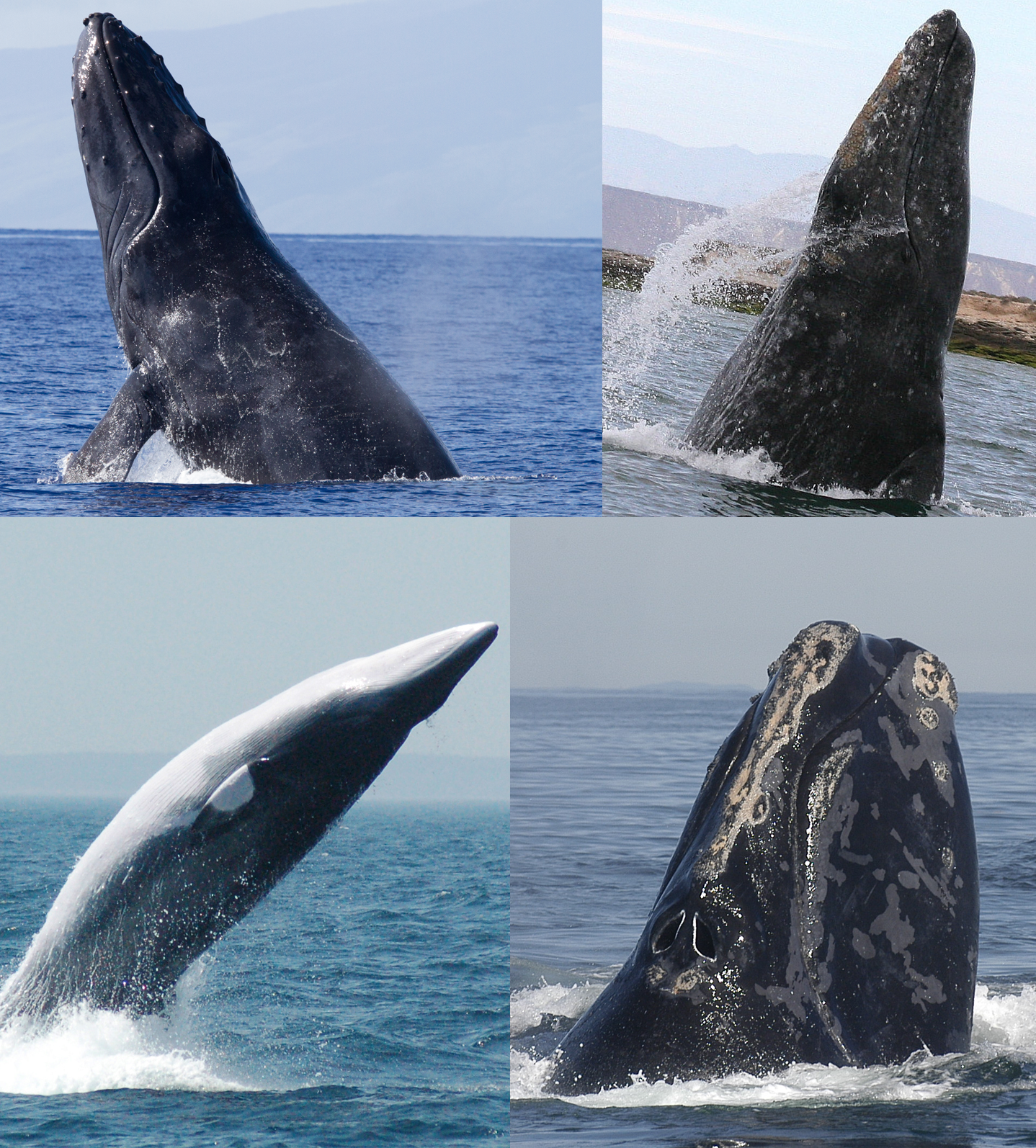
- Clockwise from top left: humpback whale, gray whale, North Atlantic right whale, and common minke whale

Scientific classification
- Kingdom: Animalia
- Phylum: Chordata
- Class: Mammalia
- Order: Artiodactyla
- Infraorder: Cetacea
- Parvorder: Mysticeti; Cope 1891

Subtaxa
- †Coronodon; †Llanocetidae; †Mammalodontidae; Kinetomenta Gatesy et al., 2022; †Aetiocetidae; Chaeomysticeti Mitchell, 1989; †Atlanticetus; †Calafiacetus; †Horopeta; †Maiabalaena; †Sitsqwayk; †Tlaxcallicetus; †Toipahautea; †Whakakai; †Eomysticetoidea; †Aglaocetus; †Cetotheriopsis; †Eomysticetidae; Balaenomorpha; Balaenoidea; Balaenidae; Thalassotherii Bisconti et al., 2013; †Diorocetidae; †Pelocetidae; Plicogulae Geisler et al., 2011; Cetotheriidae; Balaenopteridae; Eschrichtiidae

Diversity
- 16 species

Synonyms
- Mystacoceti

= Baleen whale =

Baleen whale Temporal range: late Eocene–Present

Parvorder of mammal

Baleen whales (/bəˈliːn/), also known as whalebone whales, are marine mammals of the parvorder Mysticeti in the infraorder Cetacea (whales, dolphins and porpoises), which use baleen plates (or "whalebone") in their mouths to sieve plankton from the water. Mysticeti comprises the families Balaenidae (right and bowhead whales), Balaenopteridae (rorquals), Eschrichtiidae (the gray whale) and Cetotheriidae (the pygmy right whale). There are 16 species of baleen whales. While cetaceans were historically thought to have descended from mesonychians, molecular evidence instead supports them as a clade of even-toed ungulates (Artiodactyla). Baleen whales split from toothed whales (Odontoceti) around 34 million years ago.

Baleen whales range in size from the 6 m (20 ft) and 3,000 kg (6,600 lb) pygmy right whale to the 31 m (102 ft) and 190 t (210 short tons) blue whale, the largest known animal to ever exist. They are sexually dimorphic. Baleen whales can have streamlined or large bodies, depending on the feeding behavior, and two limbs that are modified into flippers. The fin whale is the fastest baleen whale, recorded swimming at 10 m/s (36 km/h; 22 mph). Baleen whales use their baleen plates to filter out food from the water by either lunge-feeding or skim-feeding. Baleen whales have fused neck vertebrae, and are unable to turn their heads at all. Baleen whales have two blowholes. Some species are well adapted for diving to great depths. They have a layer of fat, or blubber, under the skin to keep warm in the cold water.

Although baleen whales are widespread, most species prefer the colder waters of the Arctic and Antarctic. Gray whales are specialized for feeding on bottom-dwelling crustaceans. Rorquals are specialized at lunge-feeding, and have a streamlined body to reduce drag while accelerating. Right whales skim-feed, meaning they use their enlarged head to effectively take in a large amount of water and sieve the slow-moving prey. Males typically mate with more than one female (polygyny), although the degree of polygyny varies with the species. Male strategies for reproductive success vary between performing ritual displays (whale song) or lek mating. Calves are typically born in the winter and spring months and females bear all the responsibility for raising them. Mothers fast for a relatively long period of time over the period of migration, which varies between species. Baleen whales produce a number of infrasonic vocalizations, notably the songs of the humpback whale.

The meat, blubber, baleen, and oil of baleen whales have traditionally been used by the indigenous peoples of the Arctic. Once relentlessly hunted by commercial industries for these products, cetaceans are now protected by international law. These protections have allowed their numbers to recover. However, the North Atlantic right whale is ranked critically endangered by the International Union for Conservation of Nature. Besides hunting, baleen whales also face threats from marine pollution and ocean acidification. It has been speculated that man-made sonar results in strandings. They have rarely been kept in captivity, and this has only been attempted with juveniles or members of one of the smallest species.

== Taxonomy ==
Baleen whales are cetaceans classified under the parvorder Mysticeti, and consist of four extant families: Balaenidae (right whales), Balaenopteridae (rorquals), Eschrichtiidae (gray whale) and Cetotheriidae (pygmy right whale). Balaenids are distinguished by their enlarged head and thick blubber, while rorquals and gray whales generally have a flat head, long throat pleats, and are more streamlined than Balaenids. Rorquals also tend to be longer than the latter. Cetaceans (whales, dolphins, and porpoises) and artiodactyls are now classified under the order Cetartiodactyla, often still referred to as Artiodactyla (given that the cetaceans are deeply nested with the artiodactyls). The closest living relatives to baleen whales are toothed whales both from the infraorder Cetacea.

=== Classification ===
- Mysticeti
  - - Balaenidae
      - Bowhead whale
      - - Southern right whale
        - - North Atlantic right whale
          - North Pacific right whale
    - - Cetotheriidae
        Pygmy right whale
      - Balaenopteroidea
        - - Common minke whale
          - Southern minke whale
        - - Gray whale
          - - - Humpback whale
              - Fin whale
            - - Blue whale
              - Bryde's whale complex
                - Omura's whale
                - - - Eden's whale
                    - Rice's whale
                  - Sei whale
                  - Bryde's whale

Phylogeny of baleen whales according to a 2019 analysis by McGowen and colleagues, with the Bryde's whale complex expanded following Rosel et al (2021).

Balaenidae consists of two genera: Eubalaena (right whales) and Balaena (the bowhead whale, B. mysticetus). Balaenidae was thought to have consisted of only one genus until studies done through the early 2000s reported that bowhead whales and right whales are morphologically (different skull shape) and phylogenically different. According to a study done by H. C. Rosenbaum (of the American Museum of Natural History) and colleagues, the North Pacific (E. japonica) and Southern right (E. australis) whales are more closely related to each other than to the North Atlantic right whale (E. glacialis).

Cetotheriidae consists of only one living member: the pygmy right whale (Caperea marginata). The first descriptions date back to the 1840s of bones and baleen plates resembling a smaller version of the right whale, and was named Balaena marginata. In 1864, it was moved into the genus Caperea after a skull of another specimen was discovered. Six years later, the pygmy right whale was classified under the family Neobalaenidae. Despite its name, the pygmy right whale is more genetically similar to rorquals and gray whales than to right whales. A study published in 2012, based on bone structure, moved the pygmy right whale from the family Neobalaenidae to the family Cetotheriidae, making it a living fossil; Neobalaenidae was demoted to subfamily level as Neobalaeninae.

Rorquals consist of three genera (Balaenoptera, Megaptera, and Eschrichtius) and 11 species: the fin whale (B. physalus), the Sei whale (B. borealis), Bryde's whale (B. brydei), Eden's whale (B. edeni), Rice's whale (B. ricei), the blue whale (B. musculus), the common minke whale (B. acutorostrata), the Antarctic minke whale (B. bonaerensis), Omura's whale (B. omurai), the humpback whale (M. novaeangliae), and the gray whale (E. robustus). In a 2012 review of cetacean taxonomy, Alexandre Hassanin (of the Muséum National d'Histoire Naturelle) and colleagues suggested that, based on phylogenic criteria, there are four extant genera of rorquals. They recommend that the genus Balaenoptera be limited to the fin whale, have minke whales fall under the genus Pterobalaena, and have Rorqualus contain the Sei whale, Bryde's whale, Eden's whale (and by extension Rice's whale), the blue whale, and Omura's whale. The gray whale was formerly classified in its own family. The two populations, one in the Sea of Okhotsk and Sea of Japan and the other in eastern Pacific are thought to be genetically and physiologically dissimilar. However, there is some discussion as to whether the gray whale should be classified into its own family, or as a rorqual, with recent studies favoring the latter.

=== Etymology ===
The taxonomic name "Mysticeti" (/ˌmɪstɪˈsiːtaɪ/) apparently derives from a translation error in early copies of Aristotle's Historia Animalium (in Ancient Greek), in which "ὁ μῦς τὸ κῆτος" (ho mus to kētos, "the mouse, the whale so called") was mistakenly translated as "ὁ μυστικῆτος" (ho mustikētos, "the Mysticetus"), which D. W. Rice (of the Society for Marine Mammalogy) in Rice 1998 assumed was an ironic reference to the animals' great size. An alternate name for the parvorder is "Mystacoceti" (from Greek μύσταξ "mustache" + κῆτος "whale"), which, although obviously more appropriate and occasionally used in the past, has been superseded by "Mysticeti" (junior synonym).

Mysticetes are also known as baleen whales for their baleen, which they use to sieve plankton and other small organisms from the water. The term "baleen" (Middle English baleyn, ballayne, ballien, bellane, etc.) is an archaic word for "whale", which came from Old French baleine, derived from the Latin word balæna, derived itself from the Ancient Greek φάλλαινα (phállaina).

Right whales got their name because of whalers preferring them over other species; they were essentially the "right whale" to catch.

=== Differences between families ===
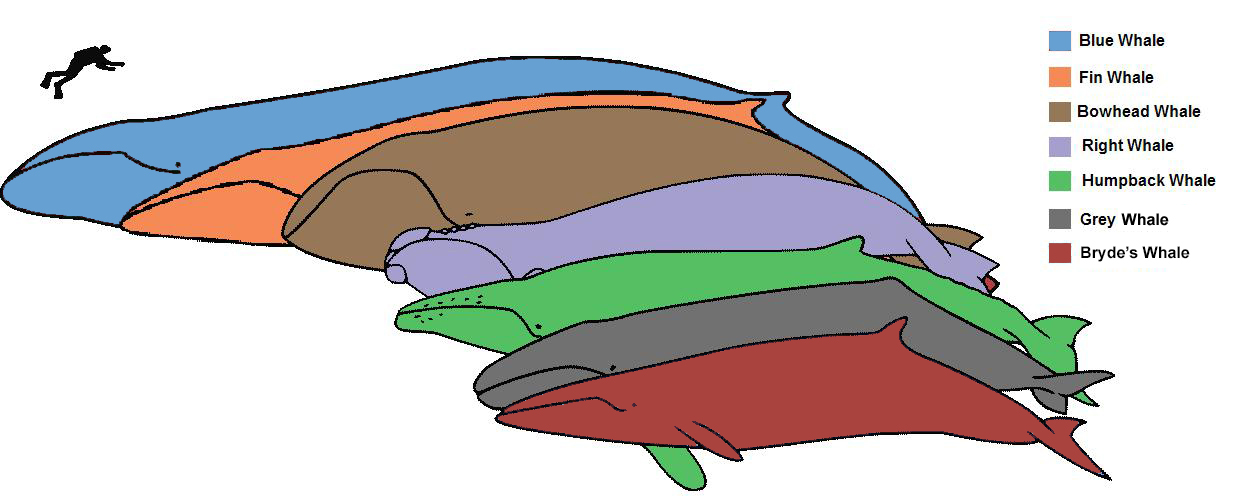
Baleen whales vary considerably in size and shape, depending on their feeding behavior.

Rorquals use throat pleats to expand their mouths, which allow them to feed more effectively. However, rorquals need to build up water pressure in order to expand their mouths, leading to a lunge-feeding behavior. Lunge-feeding is where a whale rams a bait ball (a swarm of small fish) at high speed. Rorquals generally have streamlined physiques to reduce drag in the water while doing this. Balaenids rely on their huge heads, as opposed to the rorquals' throat pleats, to feed effectively. This feeding behavior allows them to grow very big and bulky, without the necessity for a streamlined body. They have callosities, unlike other whales, with the exception of the bowhead whale. Rorquals have a higher proportion of muscle tissue and tend to be negatively buoyant, whereas right whales have a higher proportion of blubber and are positively buoyant. Gray whales are easily distinguished from the other rorquals by their sleet-gray color, dorsal ridges (knuckles on the back), and their gray-white scars left from parasites. As with the other rorquals, their throat pleats increase the capacity of their throats, allowing them to filter larger volumes of water at once. Gray whales are bottom-feeders, meaning they sift through sand to get their food. They usually turn on their sides, scoop up sediment into their mouths and filter out benthic creatures like amphipods, which leave noticeable marks on their heads. The pygmy right whale is easily confused with minke whales because of their similar characteristics, such as their small size, dark gray tops, light gray bottoms, and light eye patches.

The three baleen whale families

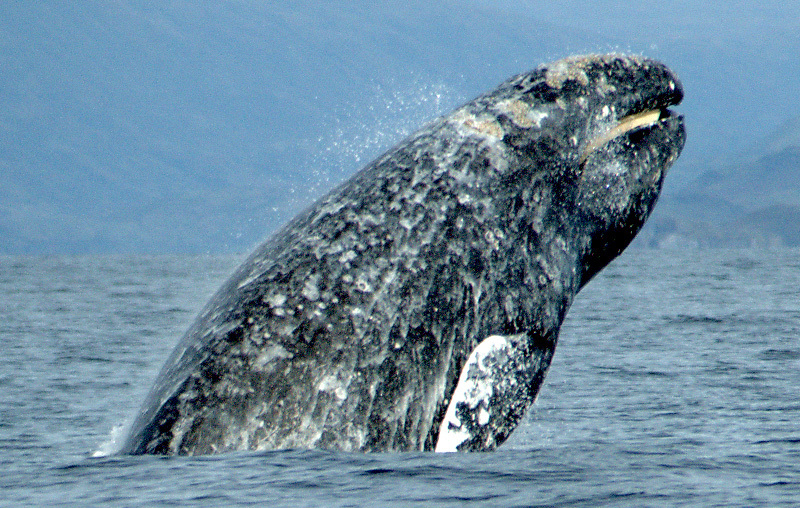
Eschrichtius, Balaenopteridae

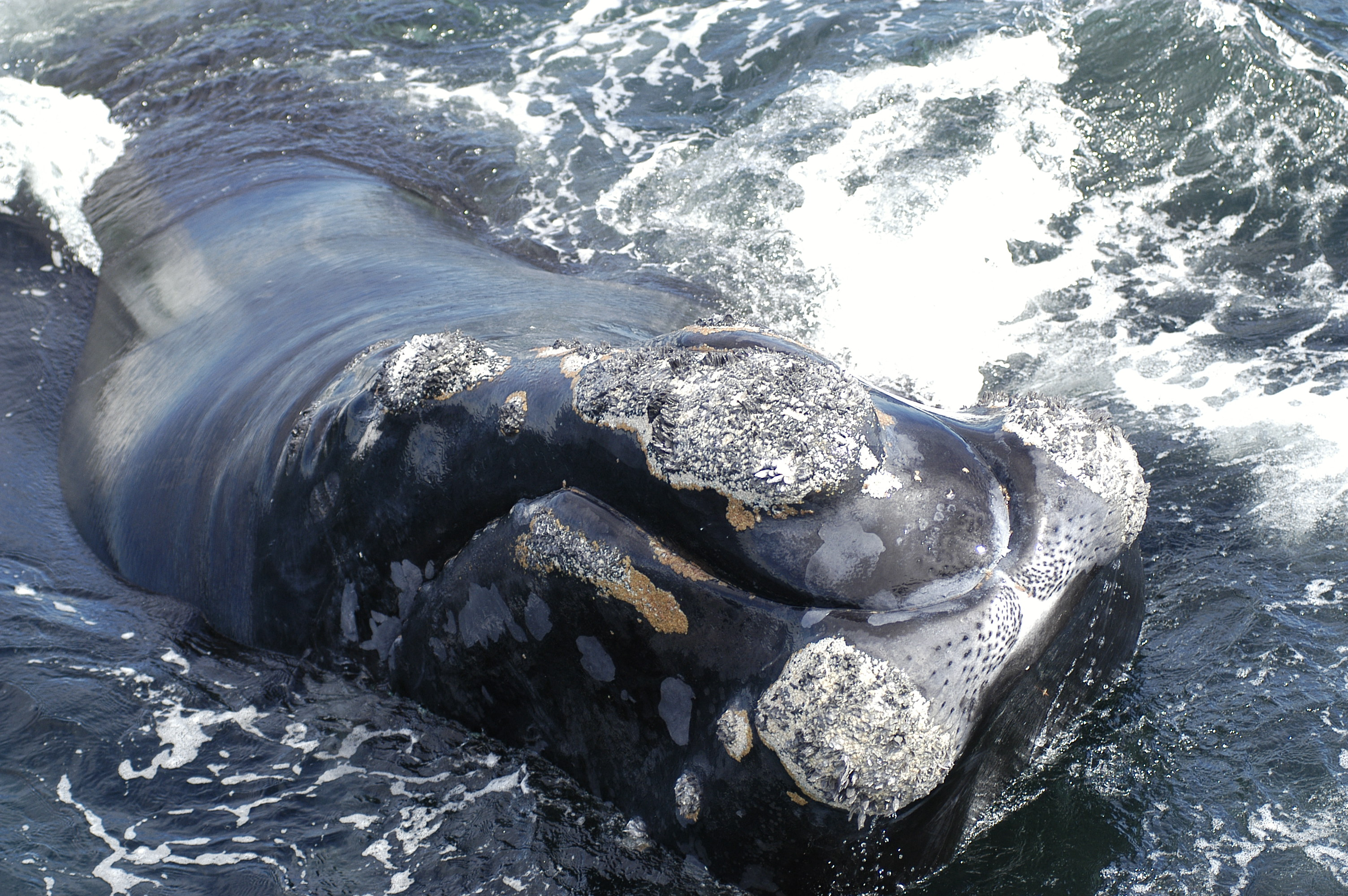
Eubalaena, Balaenidae

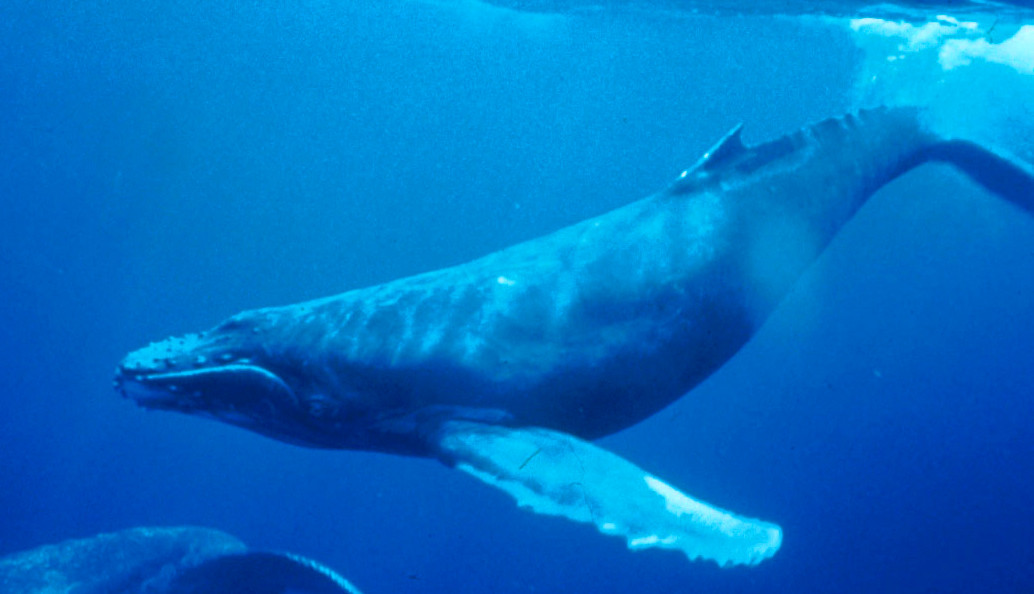
Megaptera, Balaenopteridae

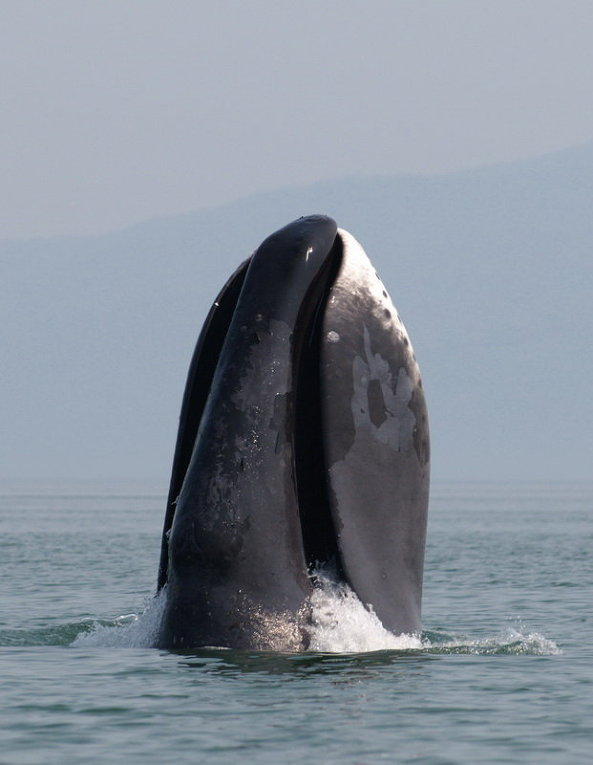
Balaena, Balaenidae

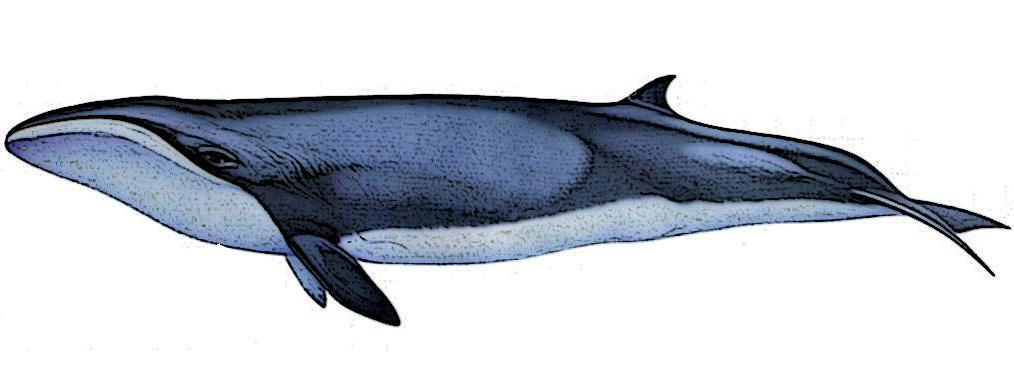
Cetotheriidae

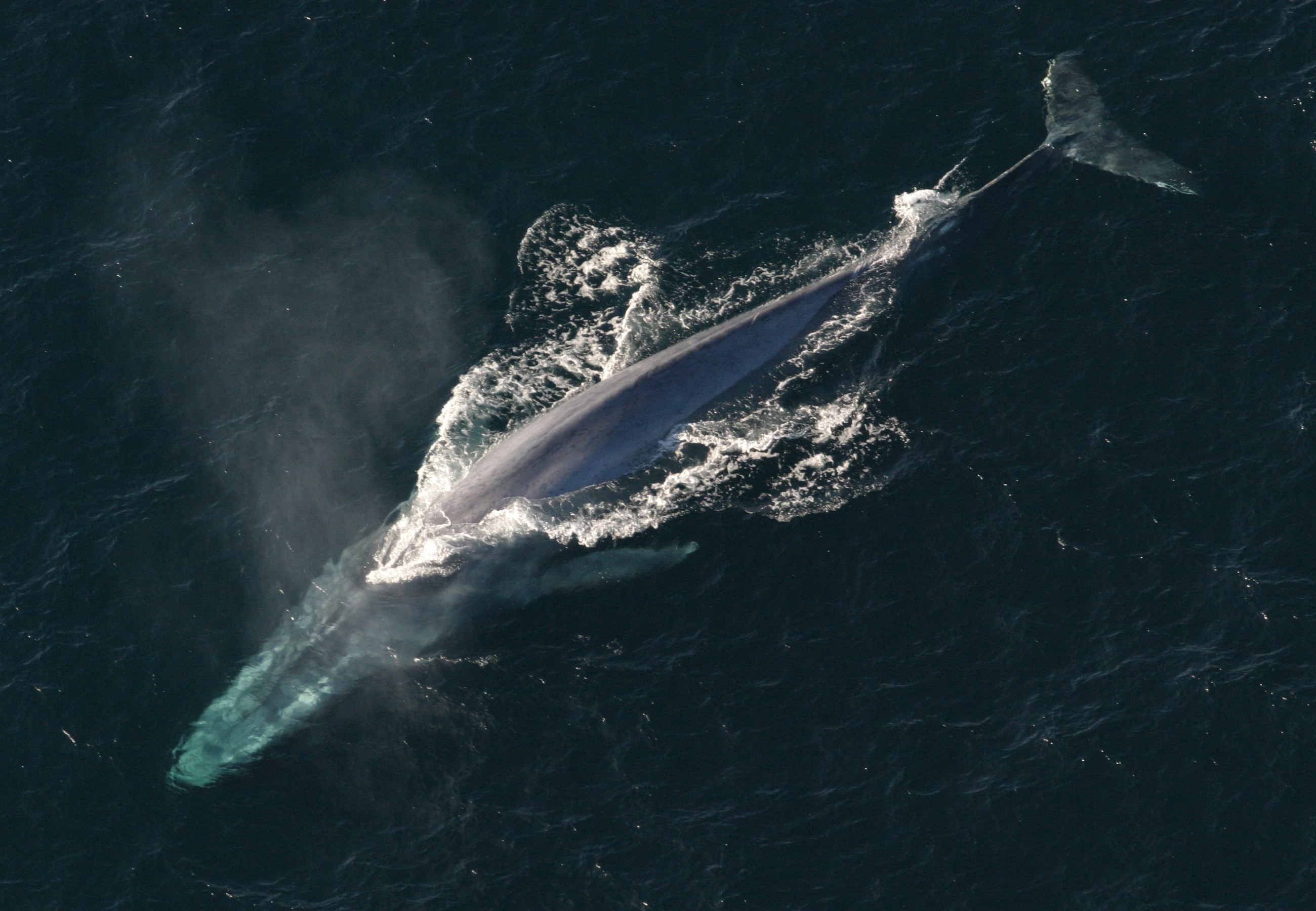
Balaenoptera, Balaenopteridae

List of mysticetes
- The "†" signs denote extinct families and genera.
  - Parvorder Mysticeti: baleen whales
    - †Coronodon
    - Family †Aetiocetidae
      - †Aetiocetus
      - †Ashorocetus
      - †Chonecetus
      - †Fucaia
      - †Morawanocetus
      - †Willungacetus
    - †Family Llanocetidae
      - †Llanocetus
    - †Family Mammalodontidae
      - †Janjucetus
      - †Mammalodon
    - †Family Mystacodontidae
      - †Mystacodon
    - Clade Chaeomysticeti
      - †Horopeta
      - †Sitsqwayk
      - †Whakakai
      - Superfamily Eomysticetoidea
        - †Family Cetotheriopsidae
          - †Cetotheriopsis
        - †Family Eomysticetidae
          - †Eomysticetus
          - †Micromysticetus
          - †Tohoraata
          - †Tokarahia
          - †Waharoa
          - †Yamatocetus
      - Clade Balaenomorpha
        - Superfamily Balaenoidea
          - Family Balaenidae: right whales and bowhead whale
            - Balaena – bowhead whales
            - †Balaenella
            - †Balaenotus
            - †Balaenula
            - Eubalaena – right whales
            - †Idiocetus
            - †Morenocetus
            - †Peripolocetus
        - Clade Thalassotherii
          - †Hibacetus
          - †Isocetus
          - †Parietobalaena
          - †Isanacetus
          - †Mauicetus
          - †Pinocetus
          - †Taikicetus
          - †Tiphyocetus
          - †Uranocetus
          - Family †Aglaocetidae
            - † Aglaocetus
          - †Family Diorocetidae
            - †Amphicetus
            - †Diorocetus
            - †Plesiocetopsis
            - †Thinocetus
          - †Family Pelocetidae
            - †Cophocetus
            - †Pelocetus
          - †Family Tranatocetidae
            - †Mesocetus
            - †Mixocetus
            - †Tranatocetus
          - Family Cetotheriidae
            - †Brandtocetus
            - Caperea, pygmy right whale
            - †Cephalotropis
            - †Cetotherium
            - †Eucetotherium
            - †Herentalia
            - †Herpetocetus
            - †Joumocetus
            - †Kurdalagonus
            - †Metopocetus
            - †Mithridatocetus
            - †Miocaperea
            - †Nannocetus
            - †Otradnocetus
            - †Palaeobalaena?
            - †Piscobalaena
            - †Titanocetus?
            - †Tiucetus
            - †Vampalus
            - †Zygiocetus
        - Superfamily Balaenopteroidea
          - †Eobalaenoptera
          - Family Balaenopteridae: rorquals
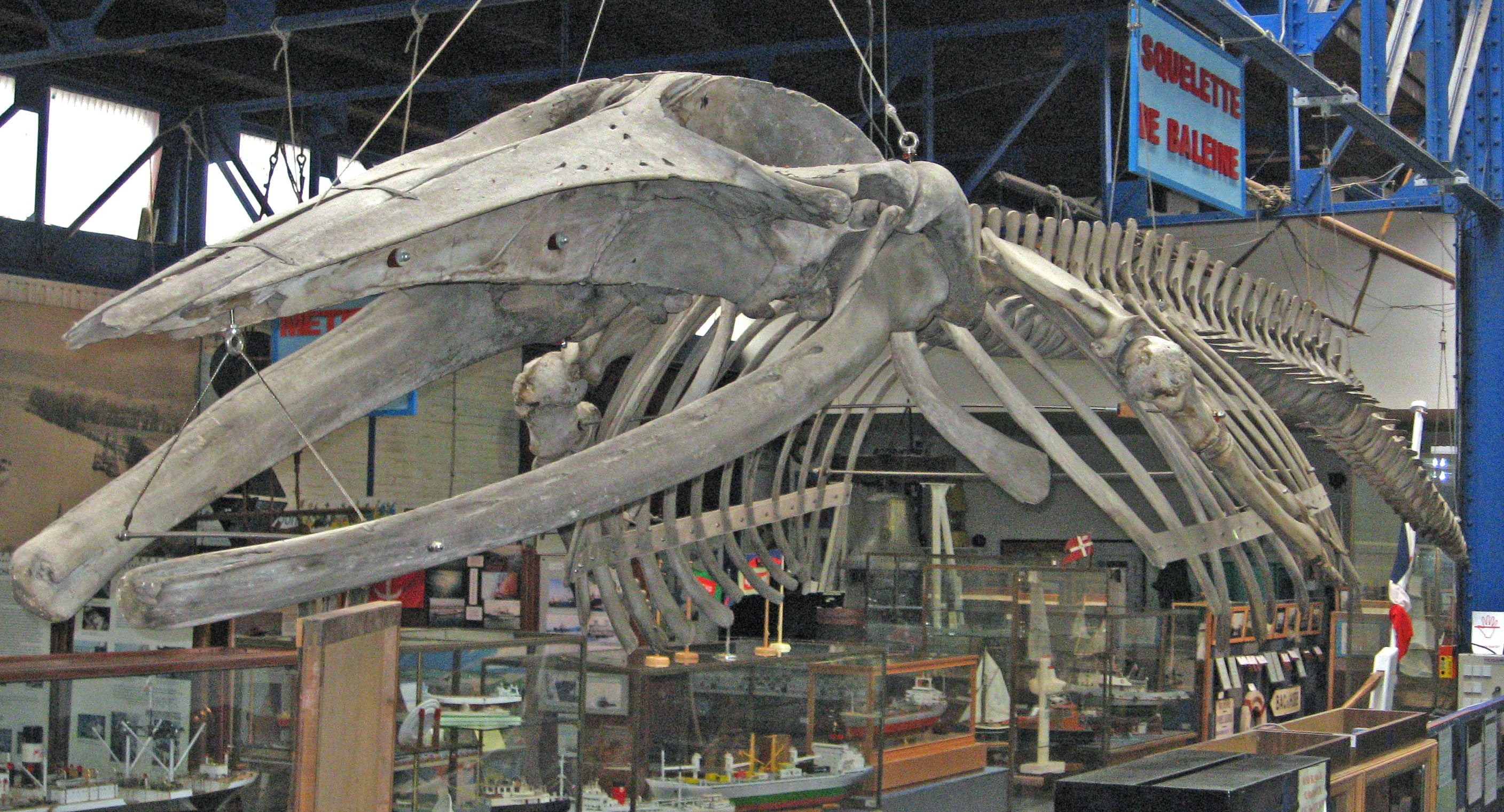
            Rorqual skeleton with unfused mandibular symphysis (split jaw) clearly visible
            - †Archaebalaenoptera
            - †Archaeschrichtius
            - Balaenoptera
            - †Burtinopsis (nomen dubium)
            - †Cetotheriophanes
            - †Diunatans
            - †Eschrichtioides
            - Eschrichtius – gray whales
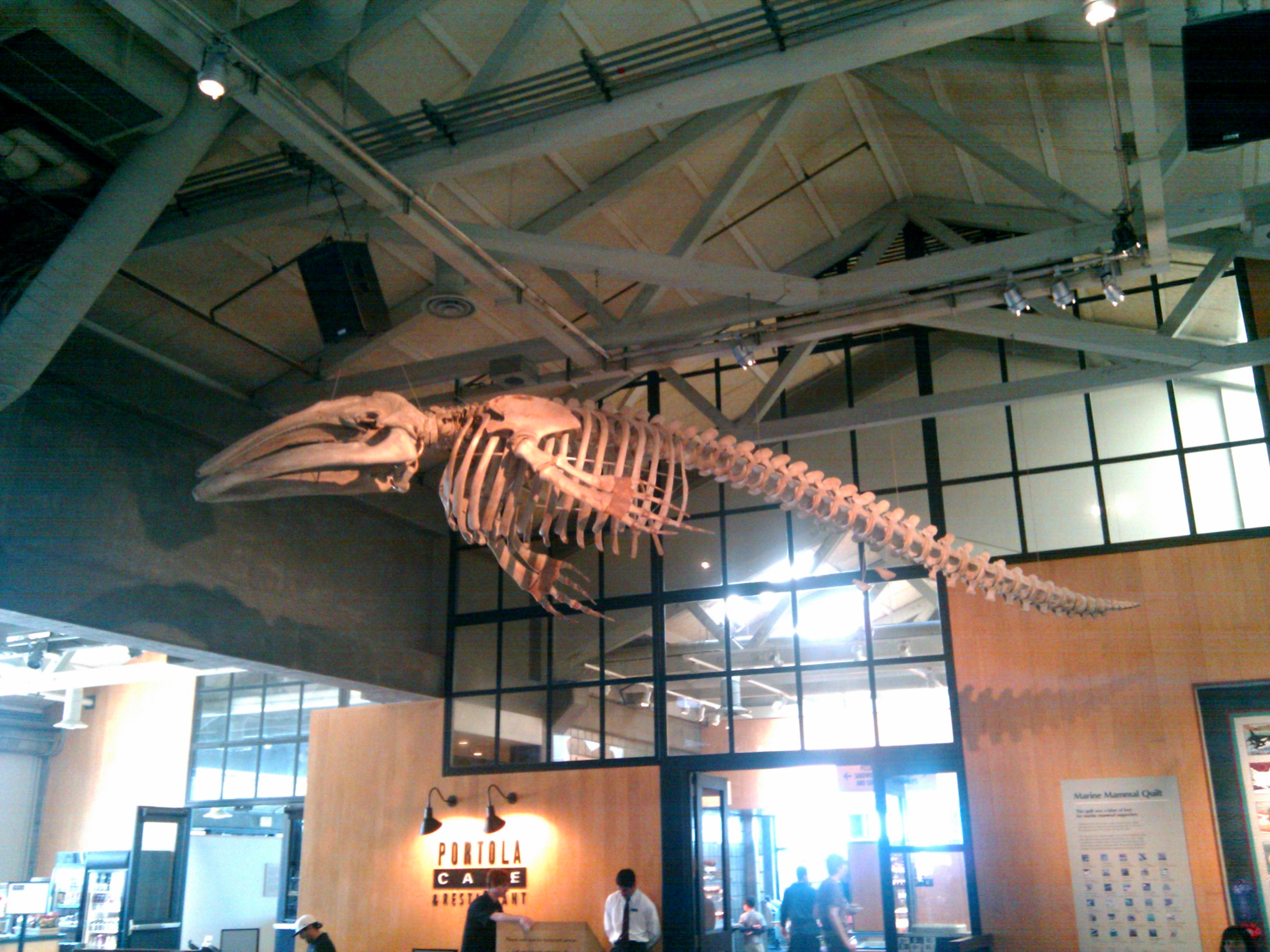
              Gray whale skeleton
            - †Gricetoides
            - Megaptera – humpback whale
            - †Megapteropsis (nomen dubium)
            - †Notiocetus
            - †Parabalaenoptera
            - †Plesiobalaenoptera
            - †Plesiocetus
            - †Praemegaptera
            - †Protororqualus
    - incertae sedis
      - Amphiptera (existence unconfirmed)
      - †Halicetus
      - †Imerocetus
      - †Mioceta (nomen dubium)
      - †Piscocetus
      - †Siphonocetus (nomen dubium)
      - †Tretulias (nomen dubium)
      - †Ulias (nomen dubium)

=== Evolutionary history ===
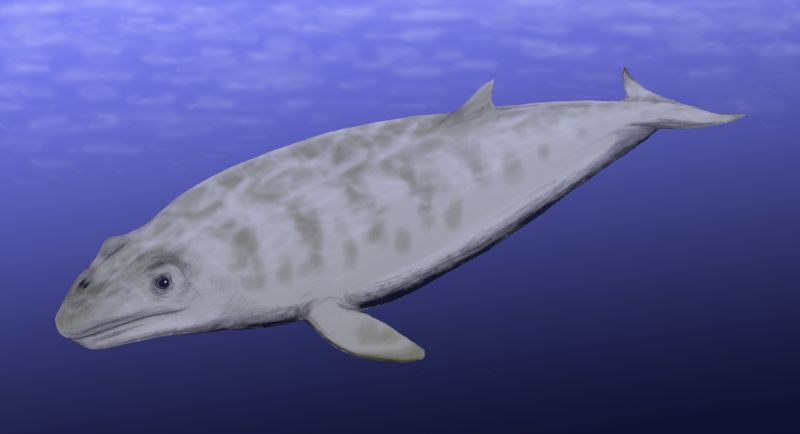
Restoration of Janjucetus hunderi

Molecular phylogeny suggests Mysticeti split from Odontoceti (toothed whales) between 26 and 17 million years ago (the late Oligocene to middle Miocene) but the earliest Mysticeti fossils date to at least 34 million years ago. Their evolutionary link to archaic toothed cetaceans (Archaeoceti) remained unknown until the extinct Janjucetus hunderi was discovered in the early 1990s in Victoria, Australia. While, unlike a modern baleen whale, Janjucetus lacked baleen in its jaw, the anatomy shows sufficient similarity to baleen whales. It appears to have had very limited apparent biosonar capabilities. Its jaw contained teeth, with incisors and canines built for stabbing and molars and premolars built for tearing. These early mysticetes were exceedingly small compared to modern baleen whales, with species like Mammalodon measuring no greater than 3 meters (10 ft). It is thought that their size increased with their dependence on baleen. However, the discovery of a skull of the toothed Llanocetus, the second-oldest mysticete, yielded a total length of 8 meters (26 ft), indicating filter feeding was not a driving feature in mysticete evolution. The discovery of Janjucetus and others like it suggests that baleen evolution went through several transitional phases. Species like Mammalodon colliveri had little to no baleen, while later species like Aetiocetus weltoni had both baleen and teeth, suggesting they had limited filter feeding capabilities; later genera like Cetotherium had no teeth in their mouth, meaning they were fully dependent on baleen and could only filter feed. However, the 2018 discovery of the toothless Maiabalaena indicates some lineages evolved toothlessness before baleen.

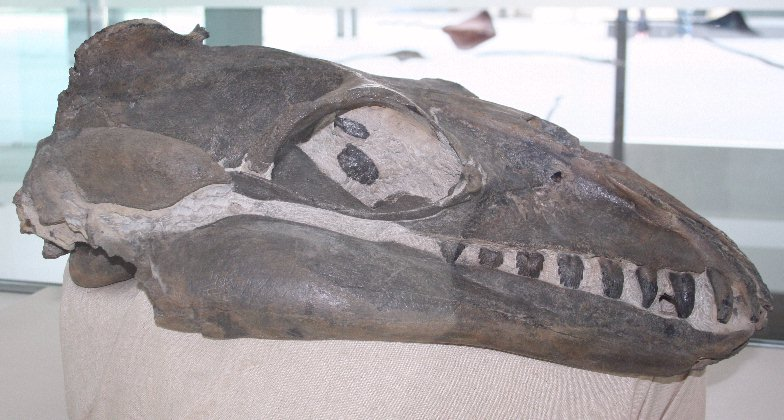
Archaeomysticetes, like Janjucetus, had teeth.

Mystacodon selenensis is the earliest mysticete, dating back to 37 to 33 million years ago (mya) in the Late Eocene, and, like other early toothed mysticetes, or "archaeomysticetes", M. selenensis had heterodont dentition used for suction feeding. Archaeomysticetes from the Oligocene are the Mammalodontidae (Mammalodon and Janjucetus) from Australia. They were small with shortened rostra, and a primitive dental formula (3.1.4.33.1.4.3). In baleen whales, it is thought that enlarged mouths adapted for suction feeding evolved before specializations for bulk filter feeding. In the toothed Oligocene mammalodontid Janjucetus, the symphysis is short and the mouth enlarged, the rostrum is wide, and the edges of the maxillae are thin, indicating an adaptation for suction feeding. The aetiocetid Chonecetus still had teeth, but the presence of a groove on the interior side of each mandible indicates the symphysis was elastic, which would have enabled rotation of each mandible, an initial adaptation for bulk feeding like in modern mysticetes. By the Early Oligocene, stem group mysticetes had evolved fully unfused, mobile mandibles.

The first toothless ancestors of baleen whales appeared before the first radiation in the Late Oligocene. Eomysticetus and others like it showed no evidence in the skull of echolocation abilities, suggesting they mainly relied on their eyesight for navigation. The eomysticetes had long, flat rostra that lacked teeth and had blowholes located halfway up the dorsal side of the snout. Though the palate is not well-preserved in these specimens, they are thought to have had baleen and been filter feeders. Miocene baleen whales were preyed upon by larger predators like killer sperm whales and megalodon.

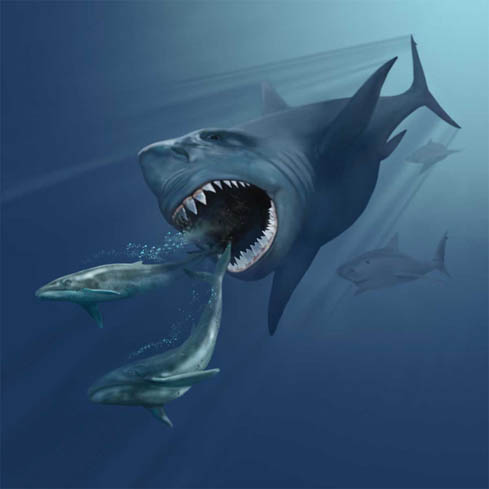
Megalodon hunted Miocene baleen whales

The lineages of rorquals and right whales split almost 20 mya. It is unknown where this occurred, but it is generally believed that they, like their descendants, followed plankton migrations. These primitive baleen whales had lost their dentition in favor of baleen, and are believed to have lived on a specialized benthic, plankton, or copepod diet like modern baleen whales. Baleen whales experienced their first radiation in the mid-Miocene. It is thought this radiation was caused by global climate change and major tectonic activity when Antarctica and Australia separated from each other, creating the Antarctic Circumpolar Current. Balaenopterids grew bigger during this time, with species like Balaenoptera sibbaldina perhaps rivaling the blue whale in terms of size, though other studies disagree that any baleen whale grew that large in the Miocene.

The increase in size is likely due to climate change which caused seasonally shifting accumulations of plankton in various parts of the world, necessitating travel over long distances, as well as the ability to feed on large baitballs to make such trips worthwhile. A 2017 analysis of body size based on data from the fossil record and modern baleen whales indicates that the evolution of gigantism in baleen whales occurred rather recently, within the last 3 million years. Before 4.5 million years ago, few baleen whales exceeded 10 meters (33 ft) in length; the two largest Miocene species were less than 13 m (43 ft) in length. The initial evolution of baleen and filter feeding long preceded the evolution of gigantic body size, indicating the evolution of novel feeding mechanisms did not cause the evolution of gigantism. The formation of the Antarctic circumpolar current and its effects on global climate patterns is excluded as being causal for the same reason. Gigantism also was preceded by divergence of different mysticete lineages, meaning multiple lineages arrived at large size independently. It is possible the Plio-Pleistocene increase in seasonally intense upwellings, causing high-prey-density zones, led to gigantism.

== Anatomy ==
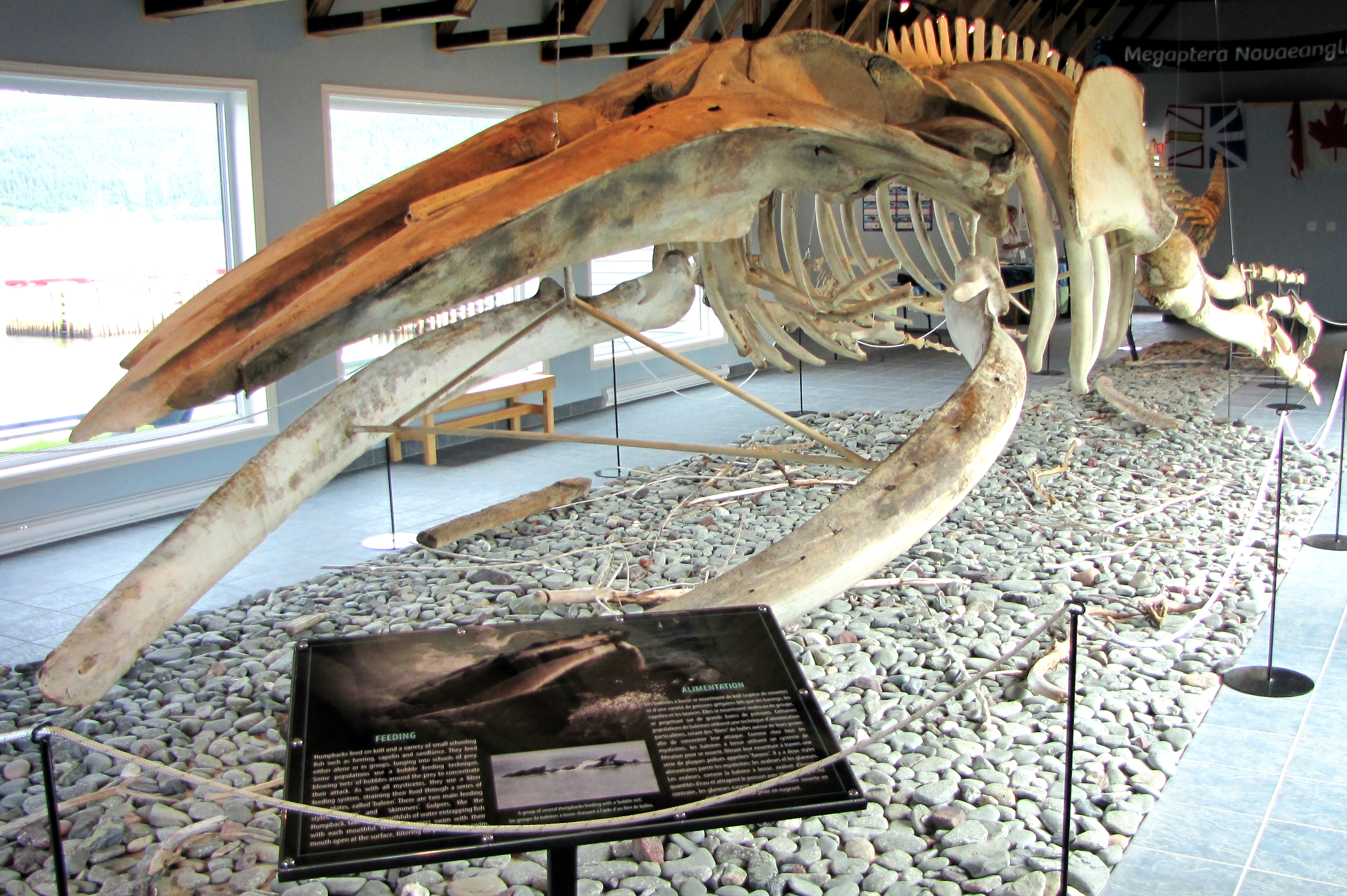
A humpback whale skeleton. Notice how the jaw is split into two.

=== Motion ===
When swimming, baleen whales rely on their flippers for locomotion in a wing-like manner similar to penguins and sea turtles. Flipper movement is continuous. While doing this, baleen whales use their tail fluke to propel themselves forward through vertical motion while using their flippers for steering, much like an otter. Some species leap out of the water, which may allow them to travel faster. Because of their great size, right whales are not flexible or agile like dolphins, and none can move their neck because of the fused cervical vertebrae; this sacrifices speed for stability in the water. The hind legs are enclosed inside the body, and are thought to be vestigial organs. However, a 2014 study suggests that the pelvic bone serves as support for whale genitalia.

Rorquals, needing to build speed to feed, have several adaptions for reducing drag, including a streamlined body; a small dorsal fin, relative to its size; and lack of external ears or long hair. The fin whale is the fastest among baleen whales, having been recorded travelling as fast as 10 m/s (36 km/h; 22 mph), and sustaining a speed of 2.5 m/s (9.0 km/h; 5.6 mph) for an extended period. While feeding, the rorqual jaw expands to a volume that can be bigger than the whale itself; to do this, the mouth inflates. The inflation of the mouth causes the cavum ventrale, the throat pleats on the underside stretching to the navel, to expand, increasing the amount of water that the mouth can store. The mandible is connected to the skull by dense fibers and cartilage (fibrocartilage), allowing the jaw to swing open at almost a 90° angle. The mandibular symphysis is also fibrocartilaginous, allowing the jaw to bend which lets in more water. To prevent stretching the mouth too far, rorquals have a sensory organ located in the middle of the jaw to regulate these functions.

=== External anatomy ===
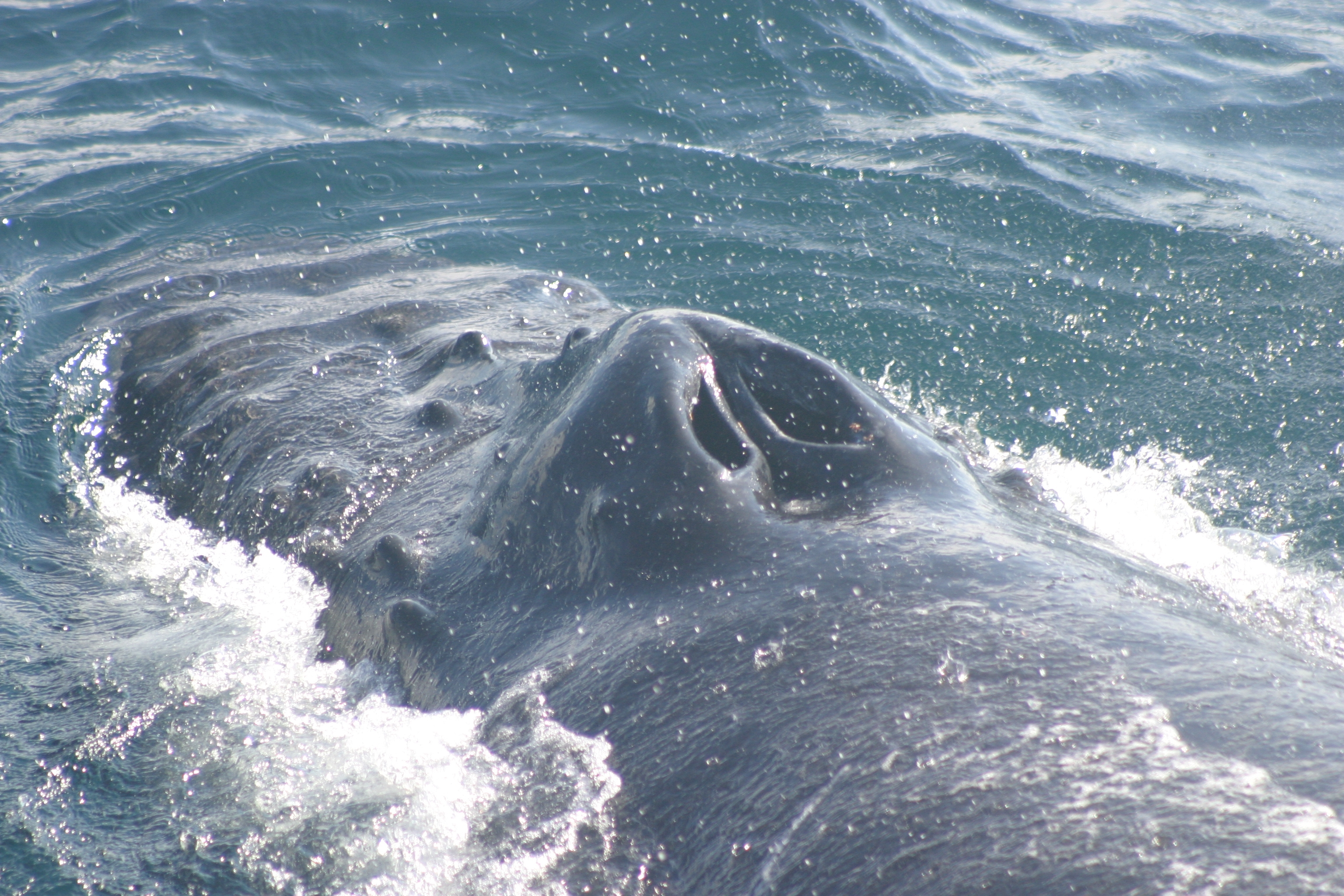
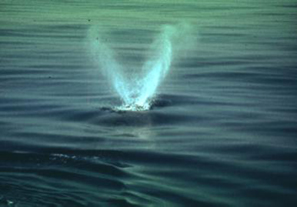
Paired blowholes of a humpback and the V-shaped blow of a right whale

Baleen whales have two flippers on the front, near the head. Like all mammals, baleen whales breathe air and must surface periodically to do so. Their nostrils, or blowholes, are situated at the top of the cranium. Baleen whales have two blowholes, as opposed to toothed whales which have one. These paired blowholes are longitudinal slits that converge anteriorly and widen posteriorly, which causes a V-shaped blow. They are surrounded by a fleshy ridge that keeps water away while the whale breathes. The septum that separates the blowholes has two plugs attached to it, making the blowholes water-tight while the whale dives.

Like other mammals, the skin of baleen whales has an epidermis, a dermis, a hypodermis, and connective tissue. The epidermis, the pigmented layer, is 5 millimeters (0.2 in) thick, along with connective tissue. The epidermis itself is only 1 millimeter (0.04 in) thick. The dermis, the layer underneath the epidermis, is also thin. The hypodermis, containing blubber, is the thickest part of the skin and functions as a means to conserve heat. Right whales have the thickest hypodermis of any cetacean, averaging 51 centimeters (20 in), though, as in all whales, it is thinner around openings (such as the blowhole) and limbs. Blubber may also be used to store energy during times of fasting. The connective tissue between the hypodermis and muscles allows only limited movement to occur between them. Unlike toothed whales, baleen whales have small hairs on the top of their head, stretching from the tip of the rostrum to the blowhole, and, in right whales, on the chin. Like other marine mammals, they lack sebaceous and sweat glands.

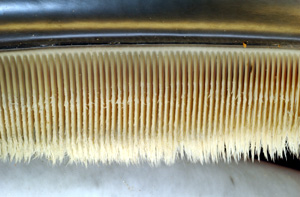
Accessory baleen plates taper off into small hairs

The baleen of baleen whales are keratinous plates. They are made of a calcified, hard α-keratin material, a fiber-reinforced structure made of intermediate filaments (proteins). The degree of calcification varies between species, with the sei whale having 14.5% hydroxyapatite, a mineral that coats teeth and bones, whereas minke whales have 1–4% hydroxyapatite. In most mammals, keratin structures, such as wool, air-dry, but aquatic whales rely on calcium salts to form on the plates to stiffen them. Baleen plates are attached to the upper jaw and are absent in the mid-jaw, forming two separate combs of baleen. The plates decrease in size as they go further back into the jaw; the largest ones are called the "main baleen plates" and the smallest ones are called the "accessory plates". Accessory plates taper off into small hairs.

Unlike other whales (and most other mammals), the females are larger than the males. Sexual dimorphism normally dictates larger males, but the females of all baleen whales are usually five percent larger than males. Sexual dimorphism is also displayed through whale song, notably in humpback whales where the males of the species sing elaborate songs. Male right whales have bigger callosities than female right whales. The males are generally more scarred than females which is thought to be because of aggression during mating season.

=== Internal systems ===
The unique lungs of baleen whales are built to collapse under the pressure instead of resisting the pressure which would damage the lungs, enabling some, like the fin whale, to dive to a depth of −470 meters (−1,540 ft). Lung volume is relatively low compared to terrestrial mammals because of the inability of the respiratory tract to hold gas while diving. Doing so may cause serious complications such as embolism. Unlike other mammals, the lungs of baleen whales lack lobes and are more sacculated. Like in humans, the left lung is smaller than the right to make room for the heart. To conserve oxygen, blood is rerouted from pressure-tolerant-tissue to internal organs, and they have a high concentration of myoglobin which allows them to hold their breath longer.

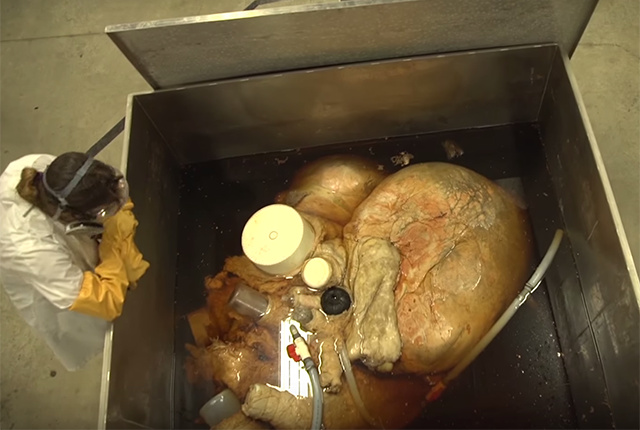
The heart of a blue whale with a person standing next to it

The heart of baleen whales functions similarly to other mammals, with the major difference being the size. The heart can reach 454 kilograms (1,000 lb), but is still proportional to the whale's size. The muscular wall of the ventricle, which is responsible for pumping blood out of the heart, can be 7.6 to 12.7 centimeters (3 to 5 in) thick. The aorta, an artery, can be 1.9 centimeters (.75 in) thick. Their resting heart rate is 60 to 140 beats per minute (bpm), as opposed to the 60 to 100 bpm in humans. When diving, their heart rate will drop to 4 to 15 bpm to conserve oxygen. Like toothed whales, they have a dense network of blood vessels (rete mirabile) which prevents heat-loss. Like in most mammals, heat is lost in their extremities, so, in baleen whales, warm blood in the arteries is surrounded by veins to prevent heat loss during transport. As well as this, heat inevitably given off by the arteries warms blood in the surrounding veins as it travels back into the core. This is otherwise known as countercurrent exchange. To counteract overheating while in warmer waters, baleen whales reroute blood to the skin to accelerate heat-loss. They have the largest blood corpuscles (red and white blood cells) of any mammal, measuring 10 micrometers (4.1×10^{−4} in) in diameter, as opposed to human's 7.1-micrometer (2.8×10^{−4} in) blood corpuscles.

When sieved from the water, food is swallowed and travels through the esophagus where it enters a three-chambered stomach. The first compartment is known as the fore-stomach; this is where food gets ground up into an acidic liquid, which is then squirted into the main stomach. Like in humans, the food is mixed with hydrochloric acid and protein-digesting enzymes. Then, the partly digested food is moved into the third stomach, where it meets fat-digesting enzymes, and is then mixed with an alkaline liquid to neutralize the acid from the fore-stomach to prevent damage to the intestinal tract. Their intestinal tract is highly adapted to absorb the most nutrients from food; the walls are folded and contain copious blood vessels, allowing for a greater surface area over which digested food and water can be absorbed. Baleen whales get the water they need from their food; however, the salt content of most of their prey (invertebrates) is similar to that of seawater, whereas the salt content of a whale's blood is considerably lower (three times lower) than that of seawater. The whale kidney is adapted to excreting excess salt; however, while producing urine more concentrated than seawater, it wastes a lot of water which must be replaced.

Baleen whales have a relatively small brain compared to their body mass. Like other mammals, their brain has a large, folded cerebrum, the part of the brain responsible for memory and processing sensory information. Their cerebrum only makes up about 68% of their brain's weight, as opposed to human's 83%. The cerebellum, the part of the brain responsible for balance and coordination, makes up 18% of their brain's weight, compared to 10% in humans, which is probably due to the great degree of control necessary for constantly swimming. Necropsies on the brains of gray whales revealed iron oxide particles, which may allow them to find magnetic north like a compass.

Unlike most animals, whales are conscious breathers. All mammals sleep, but whales cannot afford to become unconscious for long because they may drown. They are believed to exhibit unihemispheric slow-wave sleep, in which they sleep with half of the brain while the other half remains active. This behavior was only documented in toothed whales until footage of a humpback whale sleeping (vertically) was shot in 2014.

It is largely unknown how baleen whales produce sound because of the lack of a melon and vocal cords. Research has found that the larynx had U-shaped folds which are thought to be similar to vocal cords. They are positioned parallel to air flow, as opposed to the perpendicular vocal cords of terrestrial mammals. These may control air flow and cause vibrations. The walls of the larynx are able to contract which may generate sound with support from the arytenoid cartilages. The muscles surrounding the larynx may expel air rapidly or maintain a constant volume while diving.

=== Senses ===
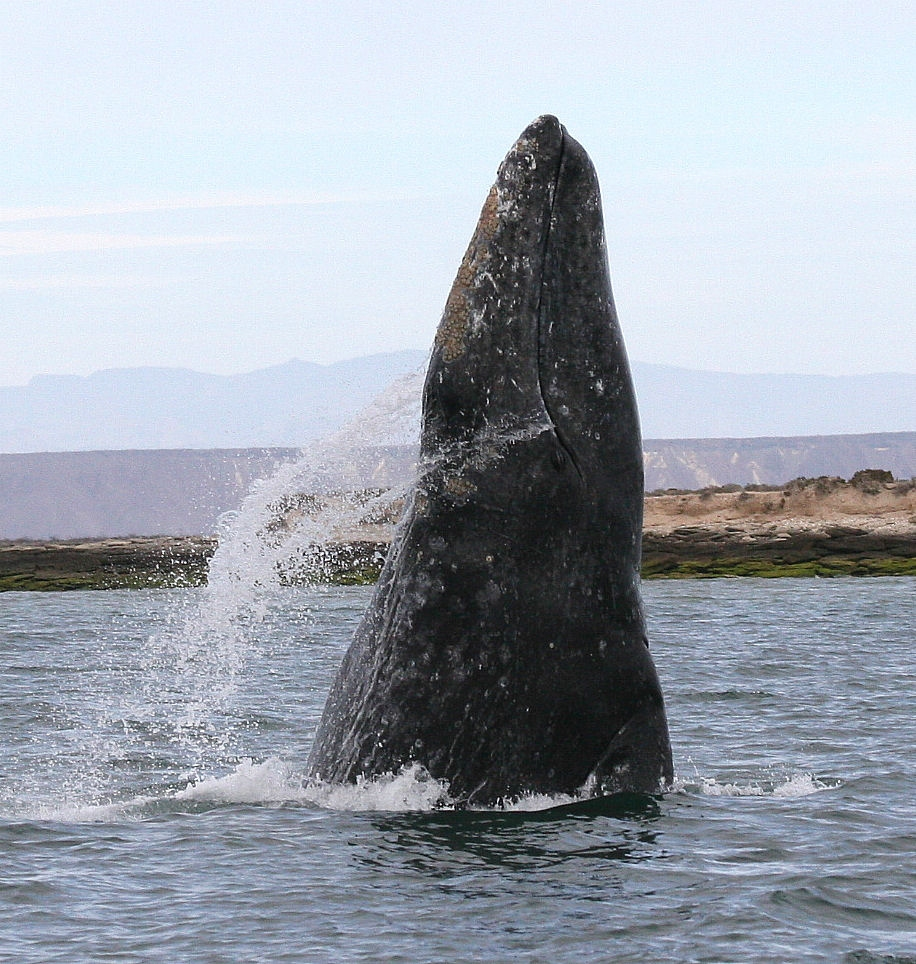
Their eyes are relatively small for their size.

The eyes of baleen whales are relatively small for their size and are positioned near the end of the mouth. This is probably because they feed on slow or immobile prey, combined with the fact that most sunlight does not pass 9.1 meters (30 ft), and hence they do not need acute vision. A whale's eye is adapted for seeing both in the euphotic and aphotic zones by increasing or decreasing the pupil's size to prevent damage to the eye. As opposed to land mammals which have a flattened lens, whales have a spherical lens. The retina is surrounded by a reflective layer of cells (tapetum lucidum), which bounces light back at the retina, enhancing eyesight in dark areas. However, light is bent more near the surface of the eye when in air as opposed to water; consequently, they can see much better in the water than in the air. The eyeballs are protected by a thick outer layer to prevent abrasions and an oily fluid (instead of tears) on the surface of the eye. Baleen whales appear to have limited color vision, as they lack S-cones.

The mysticete ear is adapted for hearing underwater, where it can hear sound frequencies as low as 7 Hz and as high as 22 kHz, distinct from odontocetes whose hearing is optimized for ultrasonic frequencies. It is largely unknown how sound is received by baleen whales. Unlike in toothed whales, sound does not pass through the lower jaw. The auditory meatus is blocked by connective tissue and an ear plug, which connects to the eardrum. The inner-ear bones are contained in the tympanic bulla, a bony capsule. However, this is attached to the skull, suggesting that vibrations passing through the bone is important. Sinuses may reflect vibrations towards the cochlea. It is known that when the fluid inside the cochlea is disturbed by vibrations, it triggers sensory hairs which send electric current to the brain, where vibrations are processed into sound.

Baleen whales have a small, yet functional, vomeronasal organ. This allows baleen whales to detect chemicals and pheromones released by their prey. It is thought that 'tasting' the water is important for finding prey and tracking down other whales. They are believed to have an impaired sense of smell due to the lack of the olfactory bulb, but they do have an olfactory tract. Baleen whales have few if any taste buds, suggesting they have lost their sense of taste. They do retain salt-receptor taste-buds suggesting that they can taste saltiness.

== Behavior ==
=== Migration ===
Most species of baleen whale migrate long distances from high latitude waters during spring and summer months to more tropical waters during winter months. This migration cycle is repeated annually. The gray whale has the longest recorded migration of any mammal, with one traveling 23,000 kilometers (14,000 mi) from the Sea of Okhotsk to the Baja Peninsula.

It is thought that plankton blooms dictate where whales migrate. Many baleen whales feed on the massive plankton blooms that occur in the cold, nutrient-rich waters of polar regions during the sunny spring and summer months. Baleen whales generally then migrate to calving grounds in tropical waters during the winter months when plankton populations are low. Migration is hypothesized to benefit calves in a number of ways. Newborns, born with underdeveloped blubber, would likely otherwise be killed by the cold polar temperatures. Migration to warmer waters may also reduce the risk of calves being predated on by killer whales.

Migratory movements may also reflect seasonally shifting patterns of productivity. California blue whales are hypothesized to migrate between dense patches of prey, moving from central California in the summer and fall, to the Gulf of California in the winter, to the central Baja California Pacific coast in spring.

=== Foraging ===
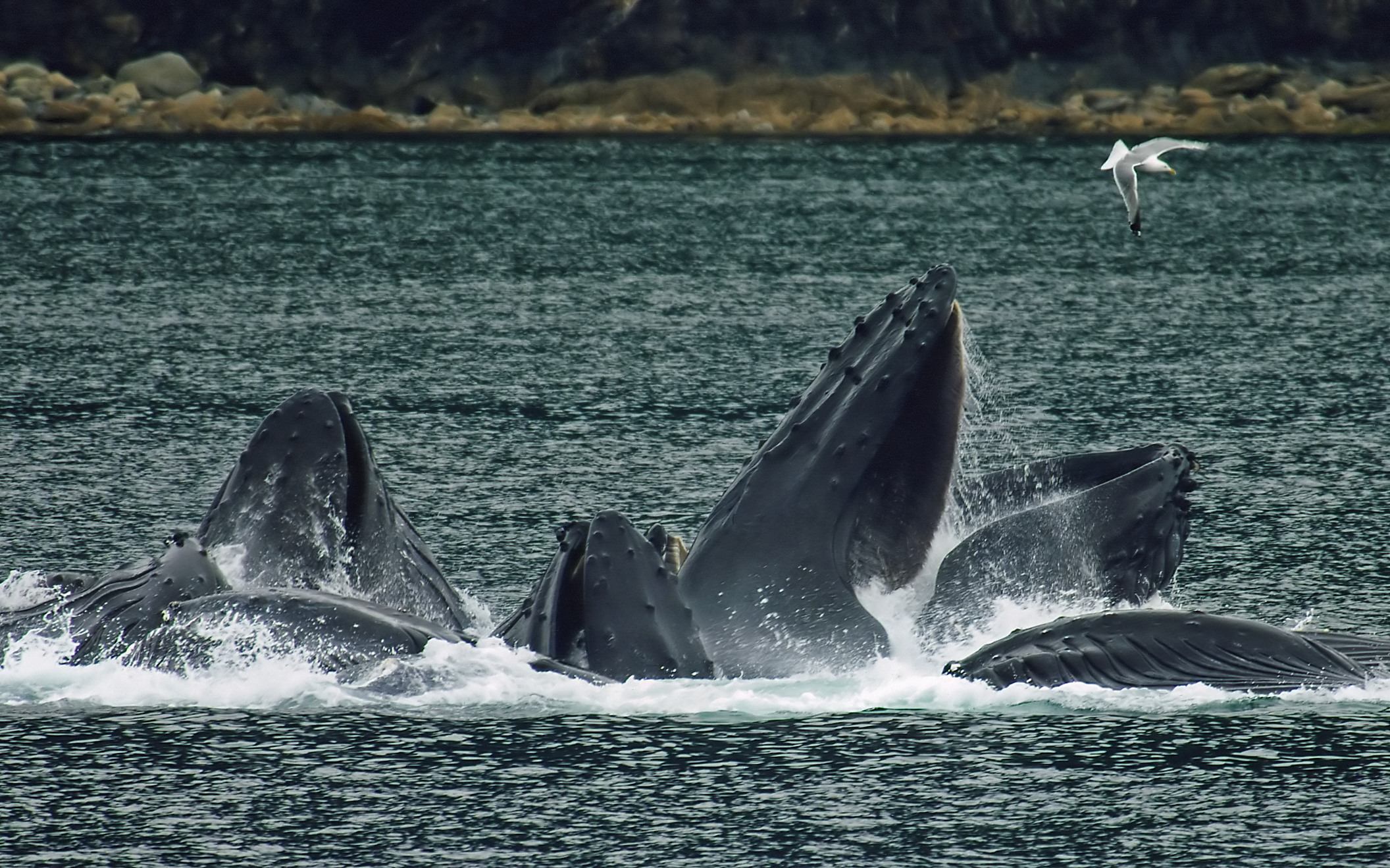
Humpback whales lunge-feeding in the course of bubble net fishing

All modern mysticetes are obligate filter feeders, using their baleen to strain small prey items (including small fish, krill, copepods, and zooplankton) from seawater. Despite their carnivorous diet, a 2015 study revealed they house gut flora similar to that of terrestrial herbivores. Different kinds of prey are found in different abundances depending on location, and each type of whale is adapted to a specialized way of foraging.

There are two types of feeding behaviors: skim-feeding and lunge-feeding, but some species do both depending on the type and amount of food. Lunge-feeders feed primarily on euphausiids (krill), though some lunge feeders also prey on schools of fish. Skim-feeders, like bowhead whales, feed upon primarily smaller plankton such as copepods. They feed alone or in small groups. Baleen whales get the water they need from their food, and their kidneys excrete excess salt.

The lunge-feeders are the rorquals. To feed, lunge-feeders expand the volume of their jaw to a volume bigger than the original volume of the whale itself. To do this, the mouth inflates, which causes the throat pleats to expand, increasing the amount of water that the mouth can store. Just before they ram the baitball, the jaw swings open at almost a 90° angle and bends which lets in more water. To prevent stretching the mouth too far, rorquals have a sensory organ located in the middle of the jaw to regulate these functions. Then they must decelerate. This process takes a lot of mechanical work and is only energy-effective when used against a large baitball. Lunge feeding is more energy-intensive than skim-feeding due to the acceleration and deceleration required.

The skim-feeders are right whales, gray whales, pygmy right whales, and sei whales (which also lunge feed). To feed, skim-feeders swim with an open mouth, filling it with water and prey. Prey must occur in sufficient numbers to trigger the whale's interest, be within a certain size range so that the baleen plates can filter it, and be slow enough so that it cannot escape. The "skimming" may take place on the surface, underwater, or even at the ocean's bottom, indicated by mud occasionally observed on right whales' bodies. Gray whales feed primarily on the ocean's bottom, feeding on benthic creatures.

Foraging efficiency for both lunge feeding and continuous ram filter feeding is highly dependent upon prey density. The efficiency of a blue whale lunge is approximately 30 times higher at krill densities of 4.5 kg/m^{3} (0.28 lb/cu ft) than at low krill densities of 0.15 kg/m^{3} (0.0094 lb/cu ft). Baleen whale have been observed seeking out highly specific areas within the local environment in order to forage at the highest density prey aggregations.

=== Predation and parasitism ===
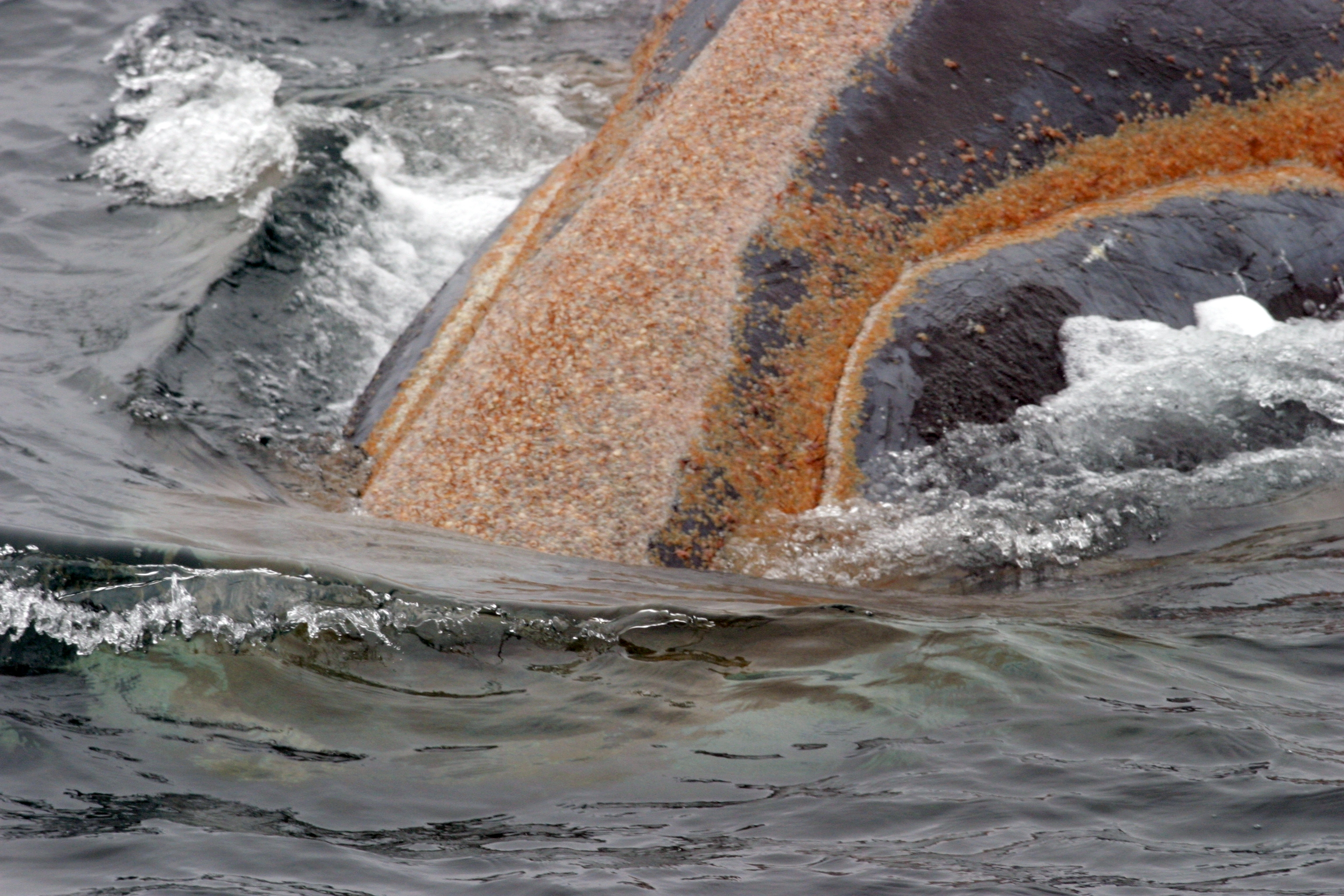
Orange whale lice on a right whale

Baleen whales, primarily juveniles and calves, are preyed on by killer whales. It is thought that annual whale migration occurs to protect the calves from the killer whales. There have also been reports of a pod of killer whales attacking and killing an adult bowhead whale, by holding down its flippers, covering the blowhole, and ramming and biting until death. Generally, a mother and calf pair, when faced with the threat of a killer whale pod, will either fight or flee. Fleeing only occurs in species that can swim away quickly, the rorquals. Slower whales must fight the pod alone or with a small family group. There has been one report of a shark attacking and killing a whale calf. This occurred in 2014 during the sardine run when a shiver of dusky sharks attacked a humpback whale calf. Usually, the only shark that will attack a whale is the cookiecutter shark, which leaves a small, non-fatal bite mark.

Many parasites and epibiotics latch onto whales, notably whale lice and whale barnacles. Almost all species of whale lice are specialized towards a certain species of whale, and there can be more than one species per whale. Whale lice eat dead skin, resulting in minor wounds in the skin. Whale louse infestations are especially evident in right whales, where colonies propagate on their callosities. Though not a parasite, whale barnacles latch onto the skin of a whale during their larval stage. However, in doing so it does not harm nor benefit the whale, so their relationship is often labeled as an example of commensalism. Some baleen whales will deliberately rub themselves on substrate to dislodge parasites. Some species of barnacle, such as Conchoderma auritum and whale barnacles, attach to the baleen plates, though this seldom occurs. A species of copepod, Balaenophilus unisetus, inhabits baleen plates of whales. A species of Antarctic diatom, Cocconeis ceticola, forms a film on the skin, which takes a month to develop; this film causes minor damage to the skin. They are also plagued by internal parasites such as stomach worms, cestodes, nematodes, liver flukes, and acanthocephalans.

=== Reproduction and development ===
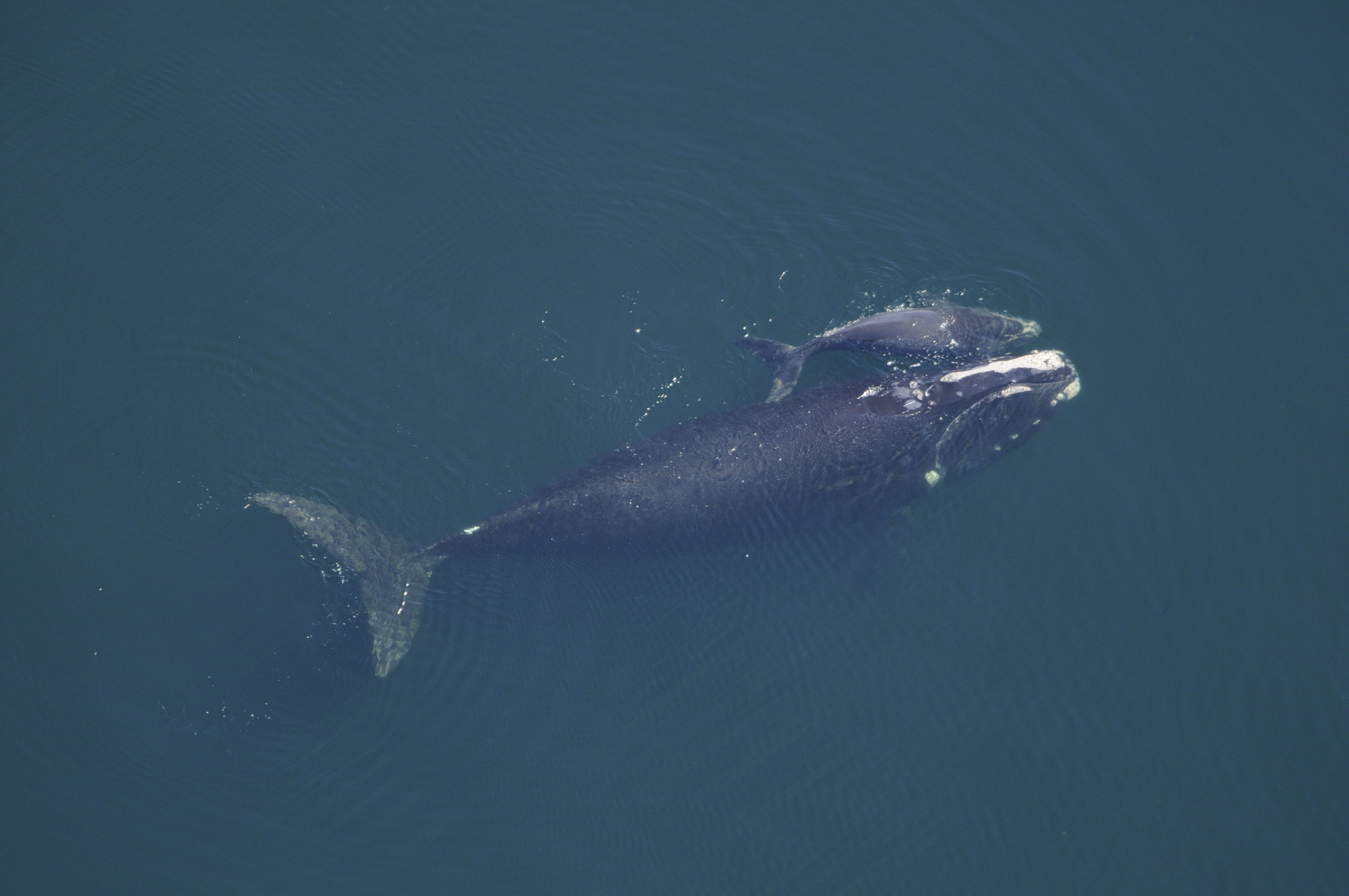
Female right whale with calf

Before reaching adulthood, baleen whales grow at an extraordinary rate. In the blue whale, the largest species, the fetus grows by some 100 kg (220 lb) per day just before delivery, and by 80 kg (180 lb) per day during suckling. Before weaning, the calf increases its body weight by 17 t (17 long tons; 19 short tons) and grows from 7 to 8 m (23 to 26 ft) at birth to 13 to 16 m (43 to 52 ft) long. When it reaches sexual maturity after 5–10 years, it will be 20 to 24 m (66 to 79 ft) long and possibly live as long as 80–90 years. Calves are born precocial, needing to be able to swim to the surface at the moment of their birth.

Most rorquals mate in warm waters in winter to give birth almost a year later. A 7-to-11 month lactation period is normally followed by a year of rest before mating starts again. Adults normally start reproducing when 5–10 years old and reach their full length after 20–30 years. In the smallest rorqual, the minke whale, 3 m (10 ft) calves are born after a 10-month pregnancy and weaning lasts until it has reached about 5 to 5.5 m (16 to 18 ft) after 6–7 months. Unusual for a baleen whale, female minkes (and humpbacks) can become pregnant immediately after giving birth; in most species, there is a two-to-three-year calving period. In right whales, the calving interval is usually three years. They grow very rapidly during their first year, after which they hardly increase in size for several years. They reach sexual maturity when 13 to 14 m (43 to 46 ft) long. Baleen whales are K-strategists, meaning they raise one calf at a time, have a long life-expectancy, and a low infant mortality rate. Some 19th century harpoons found in harvested bowheads indicate this species can live more than 100 years. Baleen whales are promiscuous, with none showing pair bonds. They are polygynous, in that a male may mate with more than one female. The scars on male whales suggest they fight for the right to mate with females during breeding season, somewhat similar to lek mating.

Baleen whales have fibroelastic (connective tissue) penises, similar to those of artiodactyls. The tip of the penis, which tapers toward the end, is called the pars intrapraeputialis or terminal cone. The blue whale has the largest penis of any organism on the planet, typically measuring 2.4–3.0 metres (8–10 ft). Accurate measurements of the blue whale are difficult to take because the whale's erect length can only be observed during mating. The penis on a right whale can be up to 2.7 m (8.9 ft) – the testes, at up to 2 m (6.6 ft) in length, 78 cm (2.56 ft) in diameter, and weighing up to 238 kg (525 lb), are also the largest of any animal on Earth.

=== Whale song ===
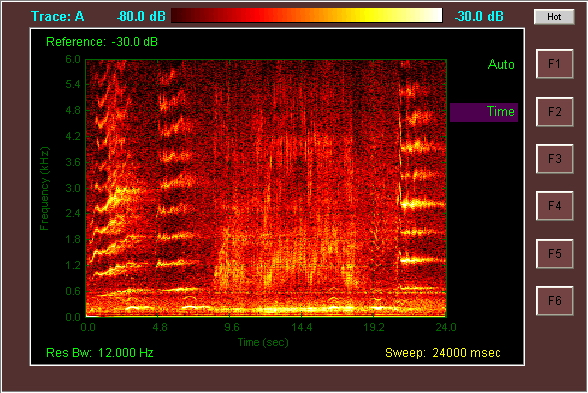
Spectrogram of humpback whale vocalizations: detail is shown for the first 24 seconds of the 37-second recording "Singing Humpbacks". The whale songs are heard before and after a set of echolocation clicks in the middle.

All baleen whales use sound for communication and are known to "sing", especially during the breeding season. Blue whales produce the loudest sustained sounds of any animals: their low-frequency (infrasonic, under 20 Hz) moans can last for half a minute, reach almost 190 decibels, and be heard hundreds of kilometers away. Adult male humpbacks produce the longest and most complex songs; sequences of moans, groans, roars, sighs, and chirps sometimes lasting more than ten minutes are repeated for hours. Typically, all humpback males in a population sing the same song over a breeding season, but the songs change slightly between seasons, and males in one population have been observed adapting the song from males of a neighboring population over a few breeding seasons.

=== Intelligence ===
Unlike their toothed whale counterparts, baleen whales are hard to study because of their immense size. Intelligence tests such as the mirror test cannot be done because their bulk and lack of body language make a reaction impossible to be definitive. However, studies on the brains of humpback whales revealed spindle cells, which, in humans, control theory of mind. Because of this, it is thought that baleen whales, or at least humpback whales, have consciousness.

== Relationship with humans ==
=== History of whaling ===
World population graph of blue whales

Whaling by humans has existed since the Stone Age. Ancient whalers used harpoons to spear the bigger animals from boats out at sea. People from Norway started hunting whales around 4,000 years ago, and people from Japan began hunting whales in the Pacific at least as early as that. Whales are typically hunted for their meat and blubber by aboriginal groups; they used baleen for baskets or roofing, and made tools and masks out of bones. The Inuit hunt whales in the Arctic Ocean. The Basques started whaling as early as the 11th century, sailing as far as Newfoundland in the 16th century in search of right whales. 18th and 19th century whalers hunted down whales mainly for their oil, which was used as lamp fuel and a lubricant, and baleen (or whalebone), which was used for items such as corsets and skirt hoops. The most successful whaling nations at this time were the Netherlands, Japan, and the United States.

Commercial whaling was historically important as an industry well throughout the 19th and 20th centuries. Whaling was at that time a sizable European industry with ships from Britain, France, Spain, Denmark, the Netherlands, and Germany, sometimes collaborating to hunt whales in the Arctic. By the early 1790s, whalers, namely the British (Australian) and Americans, started to focus efforts in the South Pacific; in the mid-1900s, over 50,000 humpback whale were taken from the South Pacific. At its height in the 1880s, U.S. profits turned to USD10,000,000, equivalent to US$225,000,000 in 2000. Commonly exploited species included arctic whales such as the gray whale, right whale, and bowhead whale because they were close to the main whaling ports, like New Bedford. After those stocks were depleted, rorquals in the South Pacific were targeted by nearly all whaling organizations; however, they often out-swam whaling vessels. Whaling rorquals was not effective until the harpoon cannon was invented in the late 1860s. Whaling basically stopped when stocks of all species were depleted to a point that they could not be harvested on a commercial scale. Whaling was controlled in 1982 when the International Whaling Commission (IWC) placed a moratorium setting catch limits to protect species from dying out from over-exploitation, and eventually banned it:

Notwithstanding the other provisions of paragraph 10, catch limits for the killing for commercial purposes of whales from all stocks for the 1986 coastal and the 1985/86 pelagic seasons and thereafter shall be zero. This provision will be kept under review, based upon the best scientific advice, and by 1990 at the latest the Commission will undertake a comprehensive assessment of the effects of this decision on whale stocks and consider modification of this provision and the establishment of other catch limits.

=== Conservation and management ===
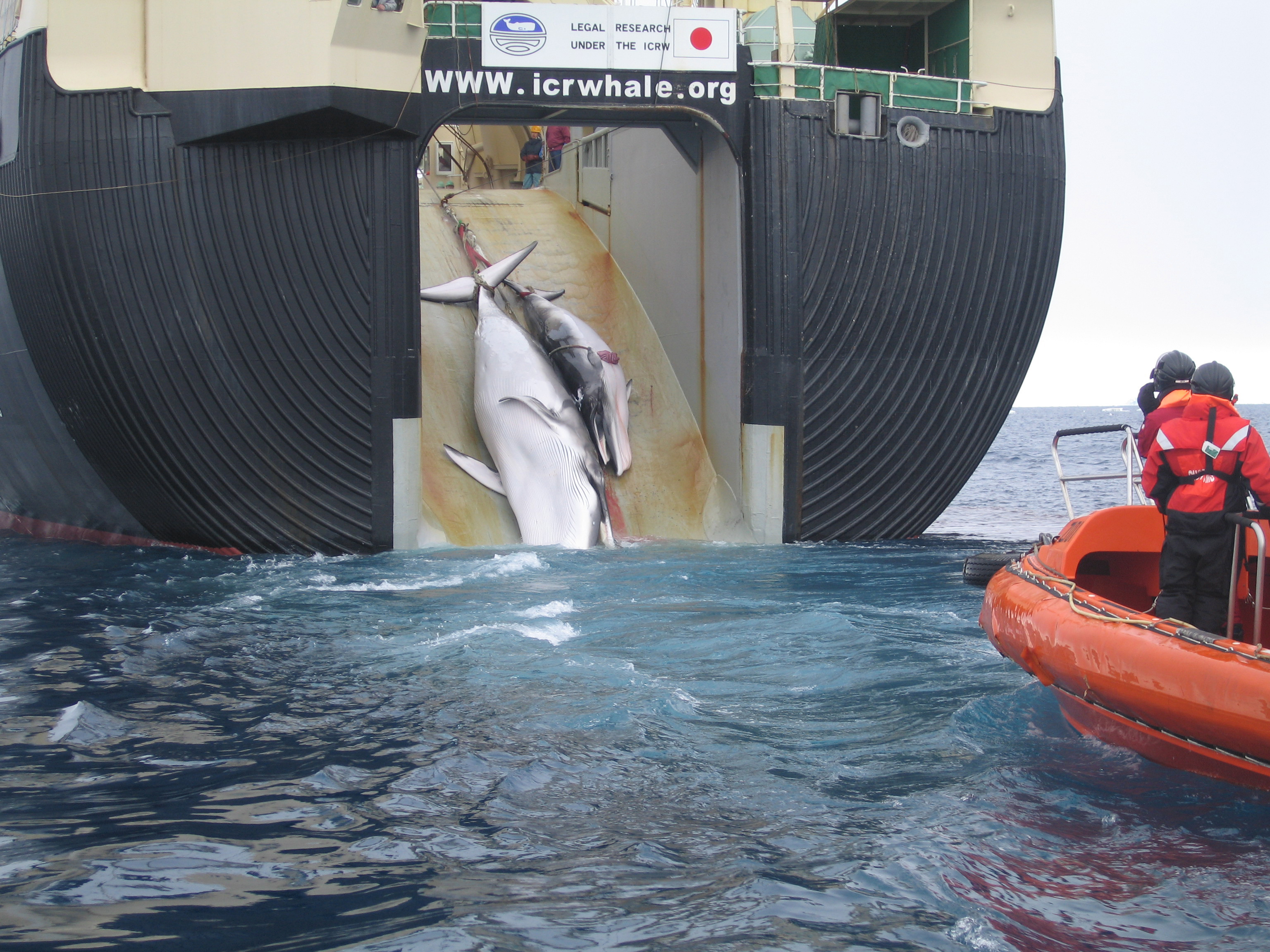
Japanese scientific whaling on a pair of Antarctic minke whales

As of 2021, the International Union for Conservation of Nature (IUCN) recognizes 15 mysticete species (not yet officially recognizing Rice's whale as a species, it still gives it a distinct population segment). Two species—the North Atlantic right whale (with only around 366 left) and Rice's whale (less than 100 remain)—are considered critically endangered. Three more are classified as endangered (the North Pacific right whale, the blue whale, and the sei whale), one as vulnerable (the fin whale), one as near-threatened (Antarctic minke whale), and one as data deficient (Omura's whale). Species that live in polar habitats are vulnerable to ongoing climate change, particularly declines in sea ice, as well as ocean acidification.

The whale-watching industry and anti-whaling advocates argue that whaling catches "friendly" whales that are curious about boats, and are the easiest to catch. This analysis claims that once the economic benefits of hotels, restaurants and other tourist amenities are considered, hunting whales is a net economic loss. This argument is particularly contentious in Iceland, as it has among the most-developed whale-watching operations in the world and the hunting of minke whales resumed in August 2003. Brazil, Argentina and South Africa argue that whale watching is a growing billion-dollar industry that provides more revenue than commercial whaling would provide. Peru, Uruguay, Australia, and New Zealand also support proposals to permanently forbid whaling south of the Equator, as Solor (an island of Indonesia) is the only place of the Southern Hemisphere that takes whales. Anti-whaling groups, such as the International Fund for Animal Welfare (IFAW), claim that countries which support a pro-whaling stance are damaging their economies by driving away anti-whaling tourists.

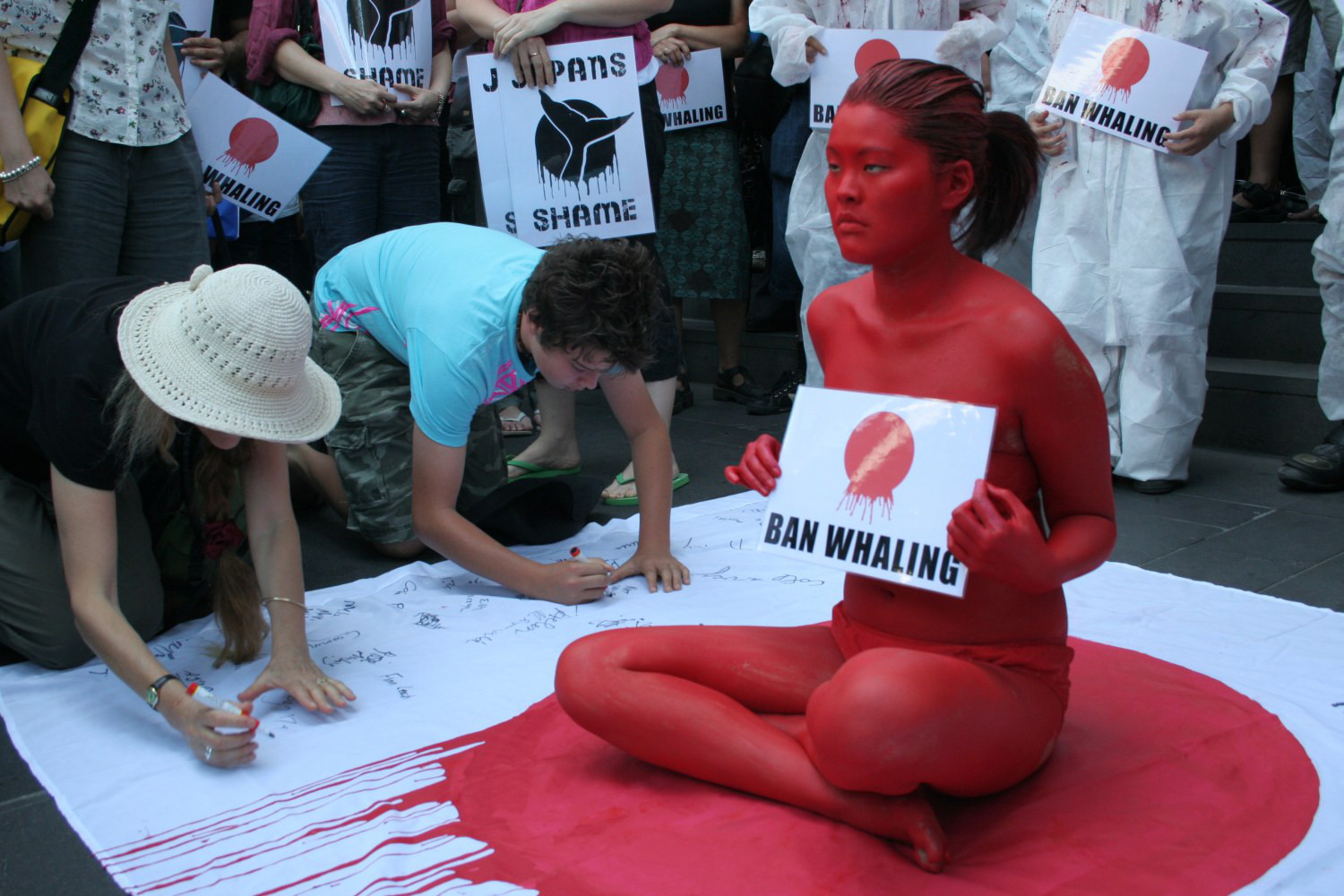
A protest against Japan's scientific whaling

Commercial whaling was historically important for the world economy. All species were exploited, and as one type's stock depleted, another type was targeted. The scale of whale harvesting decreased substantially through the 1960s as all whale stocks had been depleted, and practically stopped in 1988 after the International Whaling Commission placed a moratorium which banned whaling for commercial use. Several species that were commercially exploited have rebounded; for example, gray whales may be as numerous as they were prior to whaling, making it the first marine mammal to be taken off the endangered species list. The Southern right whale was hunted to near extinction in the mid-to-late 20th century, with only a small (unknown) population around Antarctica. Because of international protection, the Southern right whale's population has been growing 7% annually since 1970. Conversely, the eastern stock of North Atlantic right whale was extirpated from much of its former range, which stretched from the coast of North Africa to the North Sea and Iceland; it is thought that the entire stock consists of only ten individuals, making the eastern stock functionally extinct.

Baleen whales continue to be harvested. Only three nations take whales: Iceland, Norway, and Japan. All these nations are part of the IWC, with Norway and Iceland rejecting the moratorium and continuing commercial whaling. Japan, being part of the IWC, whales under the Scientific Permit stated in Article VIII in the Convention for the Regulation of Whaling, which allows the taking of whales for scientific research. Japan has had two main research programs: the Joint Aquatic Resources Permit Application (JARPA) and the Japanese Research Program in the North (JARPN). JARPN is focused in the North Pacific and JARPA around the Antarctic. JARPA mainly caught Antarctic minke whales, catching nearly 7,000; to a far lesser extent, they also caught fin whales. Animal-rights activist groups, such as the Greenpeace, object to Japan's scientific whaling, with some calling it a substitute for commercial whaling. In 2014, the International Court of Justice (the UN judicial branch) banned the taking of whales for any purpose in the Southern Ocean Whale Sanctuary; however, Japan refuses to stop whaling and has only promised to cut their annual catches by a third (around 300 whales per year).

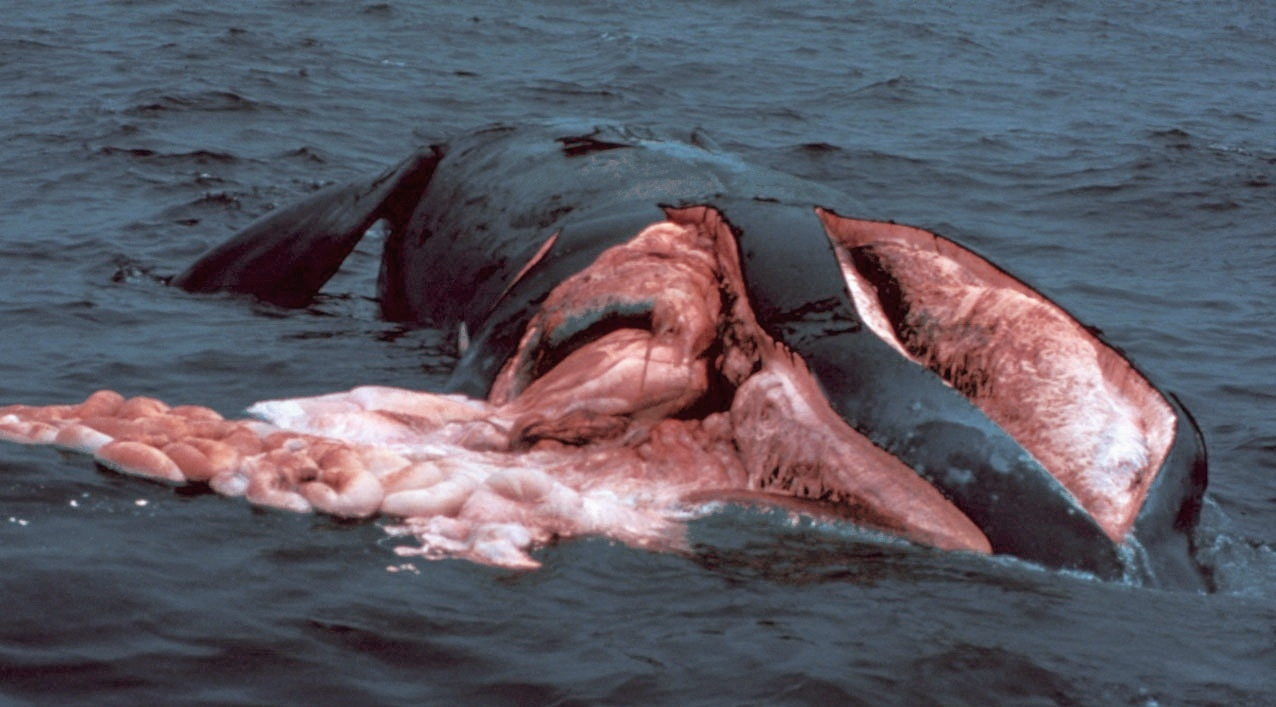
The remains of a North Atlantic right whale after it collided with a ship propeller

Baleen whales can also be affected by humans in more indirect ways. For species like the North Atlantic right whale, which migrates through some of the world's busiest shipping lanes, the biggest threat is from being struck by ships. The Lloyd's mirror effect results in low frequency propeller sounds not being discernible near the surface, where most accidents occur. Combined with spreading and acoustic shadowing effects, the result is that the whale is unable to hear an approaching vessel before it has been run over or entrapped by the hydrodynamic forces of the vessel's passage. A 2014 study noted that a lower vessel speed correlated with lower collision rates. The ever-increasing amount of ocean noise, including sonar, masks the vocalizations produced by whales, notably in the blue whale which produces the loudest vocalization, which makes it harder for them to communicate. Blue whales stop producing foraging D calls once a mid-frequency sonar is activated, even though the sonar frequency range (1–8 kHz) far exceeds their sound production range (25–100 Hz).

Poisoning from toxic substances such as polychlorinated biphenyl (PCB) is generally low because of their low trophic level. However, oil spills can be a significant threat, especially to small populations; the already endangered Rice's whale was likely devastated by the Deepwater Horizon oil spill, with some estimates indicating a decline of up to 22% in the species.

Some baleen whales can become victims of bycatch, which is especially serious for North Atlantic right whales considering their small number. Right whales feed with a wide-open mouth, risking entanglement in any rope or net fixed in the water column. The rope wraps around their upper jaw, flippers and tail. Some are able to escape, but others remain entangled. If observers notice, they can be successfully disentangled, but others die over a period of months. Other whales, such as humpback whales, can also be entangled.

=== In captivity ===
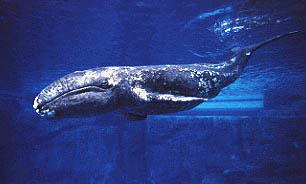
A gray whale in captivity

Baleen whales have rarely been kept captive. Their large size and appetite make them expensive to maintain. Pools of proper size would also be very expensive to build. For example, a single gray whale calf would need 215 kilograms (475 lb) of fish per day, and the pool would have to accommodate the 4-meter (13 ft) calf, along with ample room to swim. Only gray whales have survived captivity for over a year. The first gray whale, which was captured in Scammon's Lagoon, Baja California Sur, in 1965, was named Gigi and died two months later from an infection. The second gray whale, which was captured in 1971 from the same lagoon, was named Gigi II and was released a year later after becoming too big. In 1997, the last gray whale, J.J., beached itself in Marina del Rey, California, where it was rushed to SeaWorld San Diego and, after 14 months, was released because it got too big to take care of. Reaching 8,700 kilograms (19,200 lb) and 9.4 meters (31 ft), J.J. was the largest creature to be kept in captivity.

The Mito Aquarium in Numazu, Shizuoka, Japan, housed three minke whales in the nearby bay enclosed by nets. One survived for three months, another (a calf) survived for two weeks, and the third was kept for over a month before breaking through the nets.
