= Morawanocetus =

Morawanocetus Temporal range: Chattian

Scientific classification
- Kingdom: Animalia
- Phylum: Chordata
- Class: Mammalia
- Order: Artiodactyla
- Infraorder: Cetacea
- Family: †Aetiocetidae
- Genus: †Morawanocetus; Barnes et al. 1995

Species
- †M. yabukii (type) Barnes et al. 1995

Extinct genus of mammals

Morawanocetus is a genus of extinct primitive baleen whale from the family Aetiocetidae that existed during the Chattian stage of the Oligocene epoch.

Its fossils have been found in the North Pacific.

Morawanocetus was named by Barnes et al. in 1995, who described the species, M. yabukii. Three new species, dating from 17 to 19 million years ago, were unearthed between 2000 and 2005 in a road-widening project in California. These three new specimens of Morawanocetus, a genus thought to have gone extinct some five million years earlier, were discovered next to a fourth specimen, still under preparation, which clearly has archaeocete dentition.

Morawanocetus was divergent, with wide crania, elaborate cheek, tooth crowns, and short necks. The first fossils of Morawanocetus were found in the Chattian-aged Morawan Formation of Upper Oligocene Hokkaido. The more recent findings are the first Morawanocetus fossils found in California, a genus more commonly known to Japan.

Morawanocetus is a sister taxon to Aetiocetus, Ashorocetus, Chonecetus, and Willungacetus.
