= Ashorocetus =

Ashorocetus Temporal range: Oligocene, Chattian

Scientific classification
- Kingdom: Animalia
- Phylum: Chordata
- Class: Mammalia
- Order: Artiodactyla
- Infraorder: Cetacea
- Family: †Aetiocetidae
- Genus: †Ashorocetus; Barnes et al. 1995

Species
- †A. eguchii (type); Barnes et al. 1995

Extinct genus of mammals

Ashorocetus is a monotypic genus of an extinct primitive baleen whale of the family Aetiocetidae. It was named by Barnes et al. 1995, and contains one species, A. eguchii. Fossils of this whale are found from the Chattian Morawan formation, near Ashoro, of upper Oligocene (28.4 to 23.03 million years ago) Hokkaido, Japan (43.3°N 143.8°E, paleocoordinates 44.6°N 141.4°E). Ashorocetus eguchii was described based on a partial skull and is named after the type locality and Kenichiro Eguchi of the Ashoro Museum of Paleontology.

== Description ==
Barnes et al. 1995 described four new aetiocetid species, of whom Ashorocetus eguchii was the most primitive. It has a neatly telescoped skull and is closely related to Chonecetus, another primitive aetiocetid. Barnes et al. also described Morawanocetus yabukii, a more derived species with a foreshortened braincase, intermediate between Chonecetus and Aetiocetus; Aetiocetus tomitai, the most primitive Aetiocetus discovered; and Aetiocetus polydentatus, the most derived Aetiocetus with a highly telescoped cranium and both homodont and polydont dentition. Barnes et al. also proposed three subfamilies for Aetiocetidae (Chonecetinae, Morawanocetinae, and Aetiocetinae) to reflect this proposed evolution within the family. The placement of A. polydentatus in Aetiocetus has, however, been questioned, as has the monophyly (and therefore the proposed subfamilies) of Aetiocetidae.

== Sister taxa ==
- Aetiocetus
- Chonecetus
- Morawanocetus
- Willungacetus
