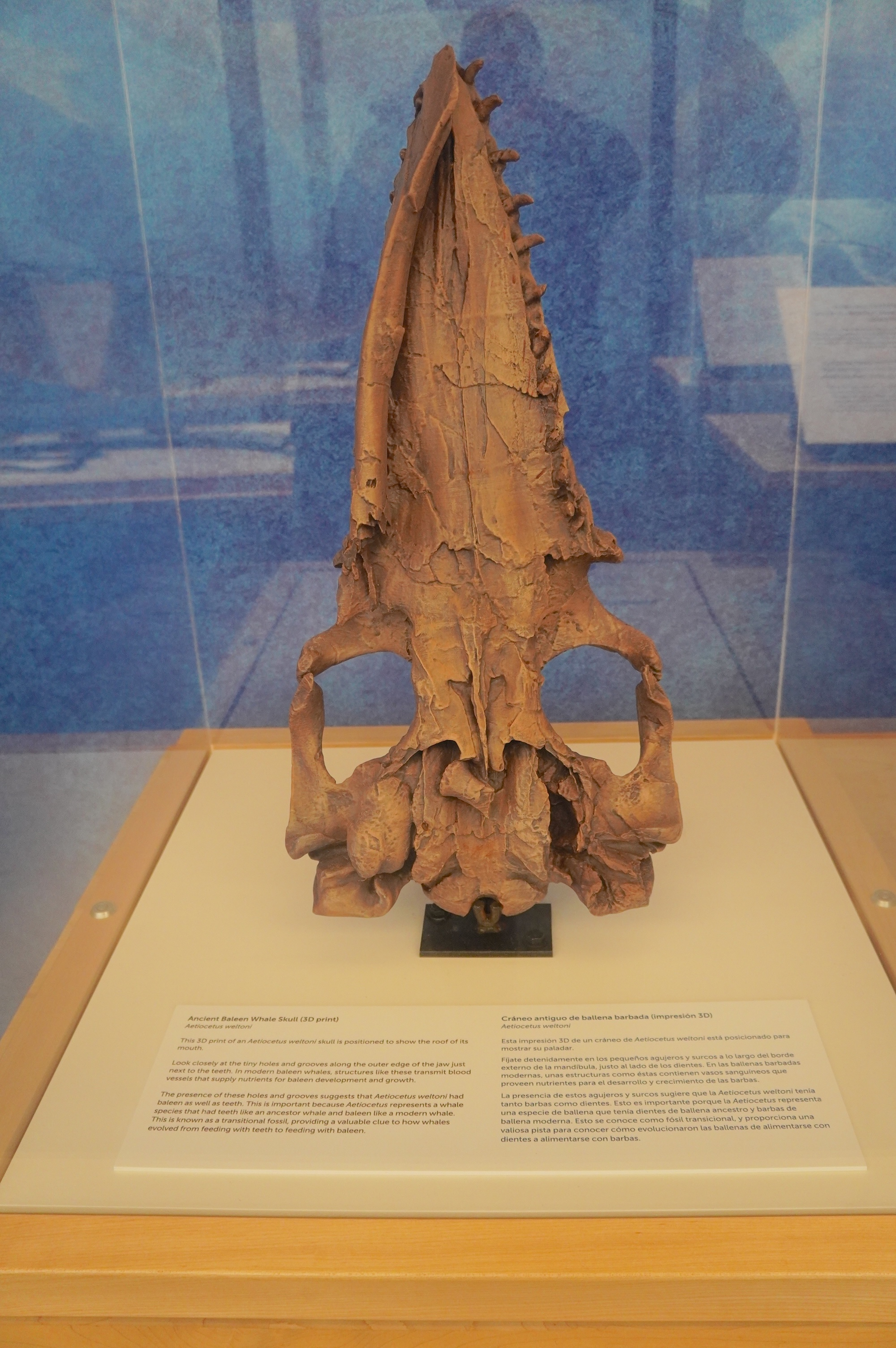
- 3D printed A. weltoni skull replica

Scientific classification
- Kingdom: Animalia
- Phylum: Chordata
- Class: Mammalia
- Order: Artiodactyla
- Infraorder: Cetacea
- Family: †Aetiocetidae
- Genus: †Aetiocetus; Emlong, 1966

Species
- A. cotylalveus (type) Emlong, 1966; A. polydentatus Barnes, Kimura, Furuwasa, Sawamura, 1995.; A. tomitai Barnes, Kimura, Furuwasa, Sawamura, 1995; A. weltoni Barnes, Kimura, Furusawa, Sawamura, 1995

= Aetiocetus =

Aetiocetus Temporal range: Oligocene

Extinct genus of mammals

Aetiocetus is a genus of extinct basal mysticete, or baleen whale that lived 33.9 to 23.03 million years ago, in the Oligocene in the North Pacific ocean, around Japan, Mexico, and Oregon. It was first described by Douglas Emlong in 1966 and currently contains known four species, A. cotylalveus, A. polydentatus, A. tomitai, and A. weltoni. These whales are remarkable for their retention of teeth and presence of nutrient foramina, indicating that they possessed baleen. Thus, Aetiocetus represents the transition from teeth to baleen in Oligocene mysticetes. Baleen is a highly derived character, or synapomorphy, of mysticetes, and is a keratinous structure that grows from the palate, or roof of the mouth, of the whale. The presence of baleen is inferred from the fossil record in the skull of Aetiocetus. Aetiocetus is known from both sides of the Pacific Ocean: it was first documented in Oregon, United States, but it is also known from Japan and Mexico. The genus is currently constrained to the Northern hemisphere and has little value in biostratigraphic studies of the Oligocene due to its limited occurrences across the Pacific.

== Etymology ==
The genus name Aetiocetus comes from Ancient Greek αἰτία via Latin 'cause, origin' and Latin cetus 'whale', translating to "original whale".

A. cotylalveus approximately means "bowl cavity", κοτύλη meaning 'cup' or 'bowl' in Ancient Greek, and alveus Latin for "hollow" or "cavity". A. tomitai is named in honor of then-mayor Akio Tomita of Ashoro, Hokkaido in Japan. A. weltoni is named in honor of Doctor Bruce J. Welton, who initially discovered the specimen and directed the excavation of the skeleton. A. polydentatus is named in reference to the increase of teeth (polydont dentition) present in the specimen.

== Phylogeny ==
There has been some dispute about the relationships between Aetiocetus and stem Mysticetes. Barnes et al. (1995) expanded Emlong's original definition to encompass eight species in four genera. They suggested a monophyletic Aetiocetidae with three subfamilies: Chonecetinae, which includes Chonecetus spp., Morawanocetinae, which includes Morawanocetus yabukii, and Aetiocetinae, which contains Ashorocetus eguchii and Aetiocetus spp. In 2002, Sanders and Barnes hypothesized that there was a larger superfamily, Aetiocetoidea, which would include all known toothed mysticetes: Aetiocetidae, Llanocetidae, and Mammalodontidae. However, evidence suggests that this "Aetiocetoidea" is a grade taxon and does not actually form a natural group, as the retention of teeth is a symplesiomorphic condition for Cetacea and cannot be used as a synapomorphy for the group.

Fitzgerald in 2006 proposed six major toothed mysticete lineages, in which Aetiocetidae was paraphyletic, with a Chonecetus clade and an Aetiocetus clade. A. polydentatus was considered by Fitzgerald to not be a member of Aetiocetus at all because of its seemingly derived features in comparison to other members of the genus Aetiocetus, for instance, its polydont dentition and greatly enlarged nasal bones. The debate regarding relationships within the Aetiocetidae highlight the importance of this clade to the understanding of basal mysticete evolution and hypotheses surrounding the loss of adult teeth and the development of baleen.

The larger scale phylogenetic placement of Aetiocetus has remained fairly constant throughout modern studies. Geisler and Sanders' 2003 paper, "Morphological Evidence for the Phylogeny of Cetacea" used the genus in their morphological cladistics study and their results support a monophyletic Aetiocetidae (Aetiocetus + Chonecetus). Here, the Aetiocetidae is the sister taxon to Eomysticetus+ Micromysticetus + Diorocetus + Pelocetus + crown Mysticeti. In their sample, Aetiocetus is the second-most basal mysticete; two undescribed museum specimens, ChM, are considered the most basal mysticetes in this phylogeny.

In Geisler et al.'s 2011 study entitled "A supermatrix analysis of genomic, morphological, and paleontological data from crown Cetacea", there is higher resolution of Aetiocetus' phylogenetic relationship with other mysticetes, as well as more taxa considered. In this study, Aetiocetus is still basal and is still the sister taxon to Eomysticetus + Micromysticetus + Diorocetus + Pelocetus + crown Mysticeti, all of which possess baleen and no teeth. There are two competing hypotheses supported by the supermatrix: 1) that Aetiocetus is not the sister group to Chonecetus, suggesting that the Aetiocetidae is a paraphyletic group, a group in which not all descendants are considered, or 2) that they indeed form a monophyletic group. Both results have been supported in previous studies.

In an even more recent paper, entitled "A Phylogenetic Blueprint for a Modern Whale", more than one species in the genus Aetiocetus is used: A. cotylalveus, A. weltoni, and A. polydentatus. These three taxa form a polytomy with Chonecetus, where the relationships of the four taxa cannot be more determined with the present resolution. However, this result suggests monophyly of the Aetiocetidae, or that all aetiocetids are derived from a single common ancestor. In this phylogeny, the Aetiocetidae is the sister taxon to Eomysticetus + Cetotheriidae + crown Mysticeti.

Almost all phylogenies agree that Aetiocetus is a stem mysticete with no affiliation with crown Mysticeti. This result is not entirely surprising, given its symplesiomorphic condition, meaning that Aetiocetus still retains many primitive features and few derived ones. Its phylogenetic placement among stem mysticetes is also in line with its late Oligocene stratigraphic occurrence, where crown Mysticeti had yet to appear in the fossil record.

== Discovery and history ==
Aetiocetus cotylalveus was discovered in 1966 and described by Emlong, who initially ascribed Aetiocetus to the Archaeoceti based on its plesiomorphic, or primitive, dentition; he felt that the presence of teeth barred Aetiocetus from the Mysticeti. There are many distinct features that separates Aetiocetus from Odontoceti, or toothed whales, and Emlong did not see evidence of remodeling necessary for the modern odontocete skull. Notably, Emlong noted that Aetiocetus was some antecedent to the mysticete lineage, due to the degree of telescoping on the skull, indicating that the nostrils of the whale had migrated further back on the skull than seen in archaeocetes. Along with the relation between cranial features, Emlong allied Aetiocetus more closely with Mysticeti than Odontoceti. However, as A. cotylalveus retains teeth, Emlong considered it a highly derived archaeocete.

Van Valen in his 1968 essay "Monophyly or diphyly in the origin of whales" placed Aetiocetus in its accepted position as a basal, or early, mysticete. In 1995, Lawrence G. Barnes and his co-authors Masaichi Kimura, Hitoshi Furusawa, and Hiroshi Sawamura described three new aetiocetids that allied with the genus Aetiocetus. These finds were unique in that they placed an aetiocetid within the same geologic formation as the type specimen, A. cotylalveus, and also placed new aetiocetids on the western coast of the Pacific, in Japan. This extended the geographic range of Aetiocetus dramatically.

In 1998, L.G. Barnes listed a specimen of Aetiocetus within his list of fossil marine mammal assemblages in Mexico. However, this specimen remains aff. Aetiocetus sp., and cannot be ascribed to any particular species. This specimen was found in Baja California in the El Cien Formation, but as of yet no paper has been published describing this specimen.

A. cotylalveus is known from the Yaquina Formation of Oregon. The Yaquina Formation is late Oligocene in age and at the cetacean's locality consists of a fine-grained grey sandstone with alternating layers of medium-grained light-grey sandstone and siltstone. The Yaquina Formation represents a coastal marine depositional environment, and is considered late late Oligocene in age (Chattian) based on foraminifera and mollusc stages; approximately 24-25 million years in age. A. weltoni is also known from the Yaquina Formation and occurs along the same cliff face as A. cotylalveus, but occurs higher in the stratigraphic section. This specimen was found in situ near the contact of the conformably overlying Nye Formation, which is Miocene in age. Thus, A. weltoni is very close to the Oligocene-Miocene boundary.

A. tomitai was discovered in the Middle Hard Shale member of the Morawan Formation, Kawakami group in Japan. This is also late Oligocene in age and represents a basinal depositional environment. This specimen was not found in situ, but in a loose concretion, and could potentially be stratigraphically higher than the Middle Hard Shale, but Barnes et al. presume that the animal was not transported far from the location where it died. A. polydentatus was also discovered in the Morawan Formation of Japan, but from the Upper Tuffaceous Siltstone Member, which also represents a basinal depositional environment. The holotype was found in situ in the uppermost part of the member. It is currently the stratigraphically highest occurrence of an aetiocetid from the northwestern Pacific Ocean, meaning that it is the youngest known specimen of Aetiocetus.

== Description ==
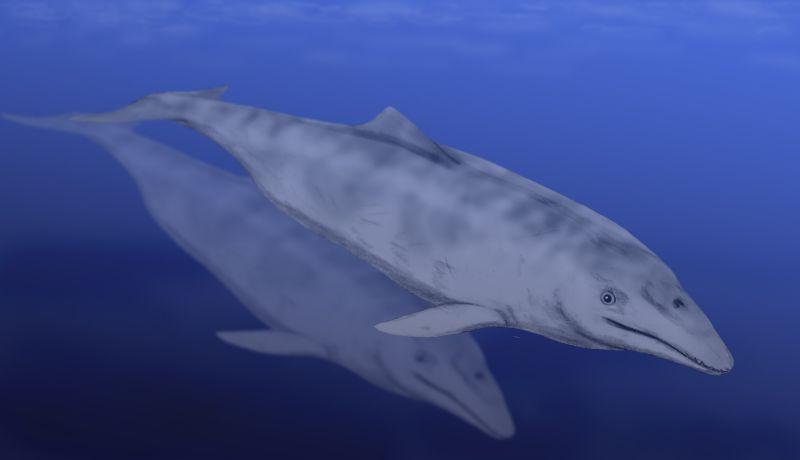
Restoration of A. cotylalveus

The type species for the genus is Aetiocetus cotylalveus. It is defined as being the monophyletic group encompassing the closest common ancestor of A. cotylalveus and A. polydentatus and all its descendants: the textbook definition for a monophyletic taxon.

=== Skull ===
In Aetiocetus weltoni, the lateral palatal foramina have an internal connection to the superior alveolar canal, the latter structure being home to blood vessels and nerves used to supply baleen with nutrients and innervate it in present-day mysticetes.

Aetiocetus is a small, toothed whale with no more than three small denticles on the anterior and posterior margins of the posterior upper teeth. Their postcanine teeth are somewhat heterodont. The base of the rostrum, or snout, of the whale, is greater than 170% of the width of the occipital condyles where the skull meets the neck. These features are synapomorphies, or shared derived traits, of Aetiocetus. There is a distinct notch by the internal nostrils formed of the palatine, pterygoid, and vomer bones; this is a synapomorphy of Aetiocetus + Chonecetus. Synapomorphies of the aetiocetids present in Aetiocetus are: the coronoid process of the dentary, or lower jaw, is well developed; the zygomatic arch is expanded anteriorly and posteriorly but is narrow at the middle. Aetiocetus also shares several traits with all mysticetes. The mandibular symphysis, or the connection between both lower jaw bones, is not fused. The descending process of the maxilla becomes a toothless plate below the orbit. They possess a wide rostrum. All these features are functionally related to filter-feeding with baleen and is a hallmark of the Mysticeti. The presence of teeth, as Barnes et al. remark, seems paradoxical.

Lastly, Aetiocetus shows some symplesiomorphic traits with more archaic whales. The do not experience the same degree of telescoping as modern whales, so their nares, or nostrils, are still relatively anterior. Contrary to the image of the modern baleen whales, Aetiocetus still possessed developed, enamelized adult teeth. This indicates that loss of functionality in relevant enamel genes, such as ameloblastin (AMBN), enamelin (ENAM), and amelogenin (AMEL), had not yet taken place in Aetiocetus.

=== Dentition ===
For the most part, Aetiocetus retains a primitive tooth count of 11 upper teeth and 11 lower teeth, abbreviated 11/11. This is interpreted to be the basic placental mammalian dental formula with three incisors, one canine, four premolars, and three molars on both upper and lower jaws. However, A. weltoni and A. polydentatus show variation from the plesiomorphic mammalian dental formula. A. weltoni possesses an 11/12 dentition.

True to its name of "many toothed", A. polydentatus possesses more teeth than any other aetiocetid, and is remarkable in that the number of teeth are asymmetrical. On the right side of the upper jaw, A. polydentatus has 13 teeth, and on the left it has 14 teeth. The bottom jaw is also asymmetric, with 14 teeth in the right dentary and 15 in the left. This is the first polydont aetiocetid, meaning that it had more teeth than the standard mammalian formula. Embryonic baleen whales have polydont teeth before birth. A. polydentatus indicates that this condition was also present in tooth-bearing mysticetes, as expected from developmental data. In addition to its polydont dentition, A. polydentatus is unique in that these teeth are not differentiated into different teeth types as seen in other members of Aetiocetus. Paleontologists refer to this condition as being homodont, or "same tooth".

=== Presence of baleen ===
Aetiocetus is unique in its representation of transition from toothed archaeocete to toothless mysticete. However, Aetiocetus is not a transitional form in the strictest sense, that is, it cannot be an ancestor to extant Mysticeti. More derived forms, such the Cetotheriidae, a family of toothless baleen whales, are contemporaneous with Aetiocetus. Hence, whales whose feeding relied entirely on baleen made their stratigraphic appearance before Aetiocetus, meaning that "true" baleen whales existed before Aetiocetus.

Baleen is made of keratin (the same material that comprises claws, hooves, nails, and hair) that grows throughout the whale's life. Development of mysticetes indicate that they had a toothed ancestor, as the fetal baleen whale forms tooth buds which are later reabsorbed and do not develop any further. However, Aetiocetus presents the evolutionary biologist with evidence for this transition in the fossil record.

While baleen, as a soft tissue, does not preserve in the fossil record, whale paleontologists are able to identify evidence for baleen attachment in the palates of mysticetes. These are evident in what are known as nutrient foramina. These nutrient foramina, present on the maxillae of the whale, are associated with grooves and sulci, or fissures, which in life are occupied by branches of the superior alveolar artery and nerve. This superior alveolar artery supplies nutrients to the epithelial, or surface cells of the body, from which the baleen continuously develops. In all known archaeocetes and odontocetes, nutrient foramina are absent. These nutrient foramina are most apparent in A. weltoni, whose holotype has the best-preserved palate.

The development of nutrient foramina and teeth are closely intertwined in mysticetes: first, an alveolar groove on the palate of the developing mysticete. The deciduous teeth form in the groove, and then are reabsorbed, while development of rudimentary baleen plates begin. The alveolar groove fills with bone until the laterial nutrient foramina form. This close association leads Deméré and Berta to hypothesize that Aetiocetus displays an ancient ontogeny, or growth sequence.

These nutrient foramina are also present on A. cotylalveus and another related aetiocetid, Chonecetus goedertorum. Compared to other edentulous, or toothless, mysticetes, the pattern of nutrient foramina is most similar to extant balaenopterids (blue whales and other rorquals) and fossil cetotheres.

=== Feeding strategy ===
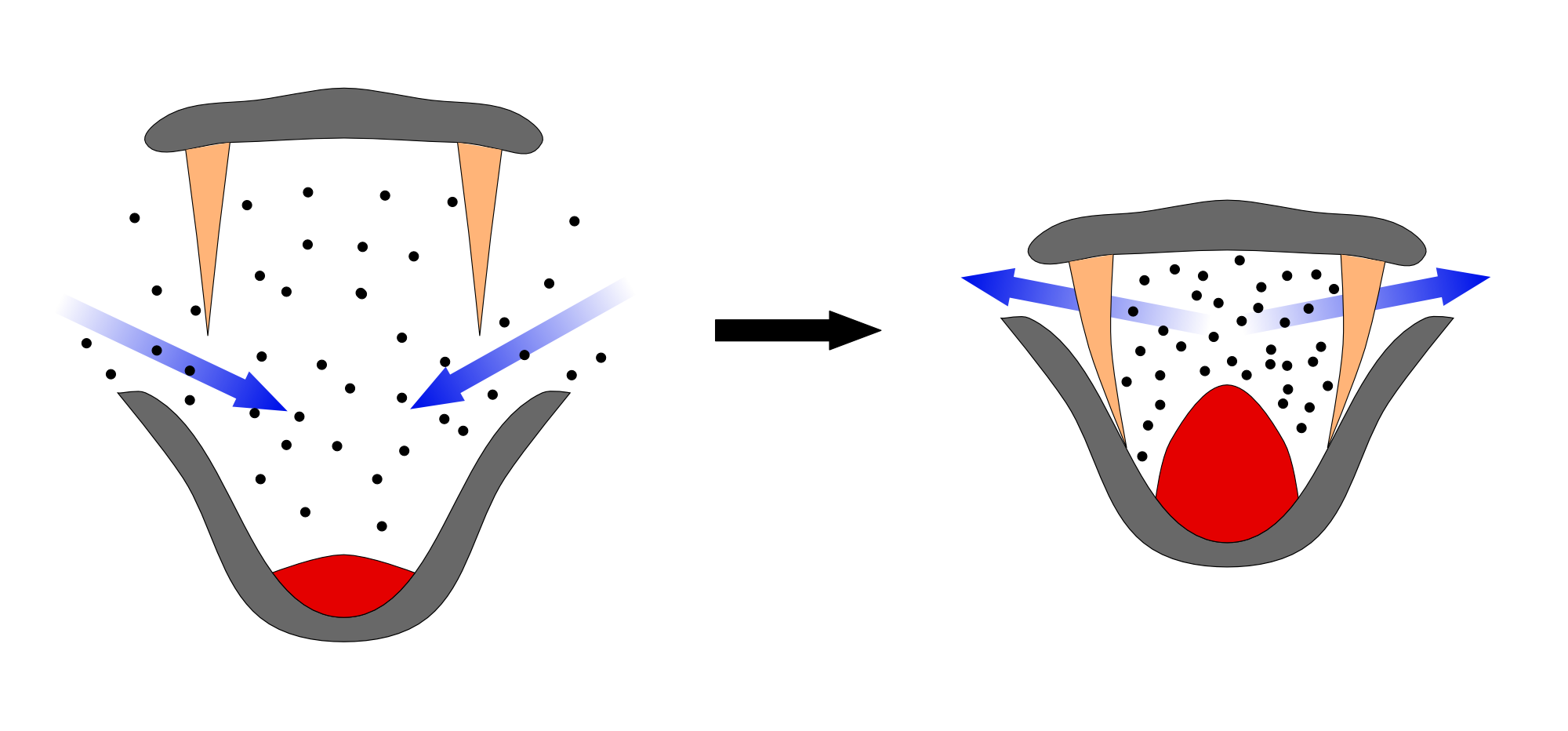
Schematic of the bulk feeding method employed by modern mysticetes. It is plausible that Aetiocetus used a variation of this method using a combination of baleen and teeth.

The teeth of Aetiocetus resemble those of archaeocetes and odontocetes, which employ a bite-and-swallow feeding strategy, but they also possessed expanded palates. Modern mysticetes grow their baleen from this expanded palate and use the baleen to trap arthropods and fish in their mouths. This is known as bulk-feeding, in that the whale is not selecting individual prey items and does not use echolocation to find prey, as odontocetes do. Fossil mysticetes with wide, toothless palates are inferred to bulk-feed and the first occurrence of such whales is in the late Oligocene, approximately 4 to 5 million years after the first toothless mysticetes appeared.

Structurally, Aetiocetus possesses teeth that are quite similar to primitive odontocetes, such as Squalodon. These odontocetes have an inferred bite and tear style of eating with limited mastication. Both primitive and extant odontocetes find their prey through the use of echolocation; however, mysticetes have no evidence in their fossil record of ever evolving or initially possessing the ability to echolocate. Piscivory, or a diet based solely on fish, is likely the primitive condition for Cetacea, and it seems most parsimonious that Aetiocetus fed like an archaeocete, locating fish without the use of echolocation.

However, an argument exists that Aetiocetus was in fact a bulk feeder, who fed by gulping and straining prey from the water through their interlocking cusped cheek teeth. This is supported by the presence of a lack of mandibular symphysis, meaning the jaw was loosely articulated, and by the presence of the wide palate. This feeding method has an analog in crab-eater seals. This hypothesis combines the idea of bulk feeding and retention of the dentition. Aetiocetus might have been a functional mysticete. Lending credence to this interpretation is the presence of mandibular kinesis in Aetiocetus, though they lack the rostral kinesis seen in more derived mysticetes. This cranial kinesis, or ability of the skull bones to move relative to one another, permit the mysticete skull to decrease the strain exerted on the skull during bulk feeding.

Fitzgerald argued against the model of tooth-aided filter feeding, based on the lack of closely pressed teeth and the presence of simple postcanine crowns. Deméré argues that this assumes a very small prey size (i.e., krill). The distinction here is that Aetiocetus was a bulk feeder, and prey size does not enter into this definition of feeding strategy. There is no reason to assume a priori that all bulk filter-feeders eat small prey, given the large diversity of food items consumed by modern mysticetes. Deméré hypothesizes that Aetiocetus' bulk feeding behavior could have targeted large prey, such as schooling fish or squid. With prey items of this size, Aetiocetus' teeth would still have served well as a coarse sieve.

=== Geography and endemism ===
At first glance, the fact that species are known from only one locality, and that may suggest that Aetiocetus was highly endemic. Deméré and Berta consider Aetiocetus to be a lineage endemic to the north Pacific Ocean basin. High endemism would be highly atypical of mysticetes. However, a more likely explanation is that the fossil record for Aetiocetus is poor, or that a sampling bias is present and not enough work has been done in late Oligocene deposits in the south Pacific Ocean. Perhaps there are more specimens of Aetiocetus that will be discovered as paleontologists continue searching.

The other genera in the family Aetiocetidae are Ashorocetus, Chonecetus, Morawanocetus, and Willungacetus. All aetiocetids are known from the North Pacific except the Australian Willungacetus and its taxonomy is disputed.

== See also ==
- Evolution of cetaceans
