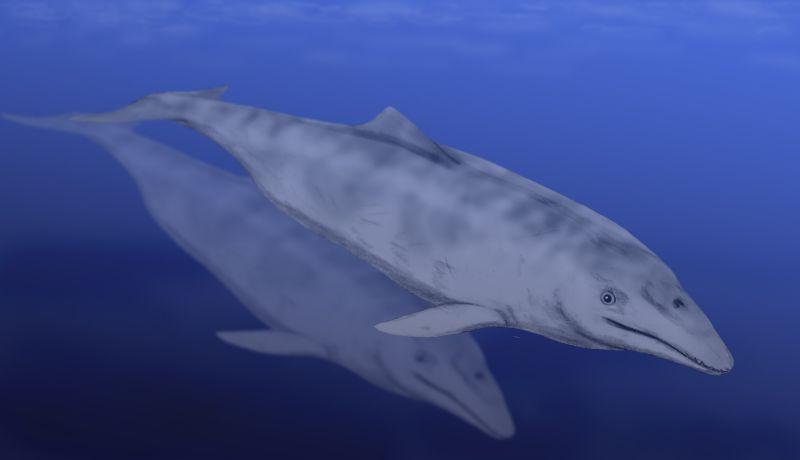
- Aetiocetus cotylalveus, an early baleen whale from the Late Oligocene of Oregon, pencil drawing, digital coloring

Scientific classification
- Kingdom: Animalia
- Phylum: Chordata
- Class: Mammalia
- Order: Artiodactyla
- Infraorder: Cetacea
- Superfamily: †Aetiocetoidea
- Family: †Aetiocetidae; Emlong, 1966

Genera
- Aetiocetus; Ashorocetus?(nomen dubium); Borealodon; Chonecetus; Fucaia; Kaaucetus; Morawanocetus; Salishicetus

= Aetiocetidae =

Aetiocetidae Temporal range: Oligocene

Extinct family of mammals

Aetiocetidae is an extinct family of toothed baleen whales known from the Oligocene and latest Eocene, so far only from rocks deposited in the North Pacific Ocean. The whales ranged in size from 3 to 8 metres (10 to 26 ft) long. Many of the described specimens were discovered from the Upper Oligocene of the Japanese Morawan Formation, the largest known one from the Morawan's Upper tuffaceous siltstone. Other formally described extinct toothed mysticetis from this time are smaller, from 3 to 4 metres (10 to 13 ft) in length. Mysticeti with true baleen are seen in fossils from the Upper Oligocene. The monophyly of the family is still uncertain, as are the evolutionary relationship between the early toothed baleen whales (Aetiocetidae, Mammalodontidae, and Llanocetidae) and the early and extant edentulous baleen whales. However, the cladistic analyses of Coronodon and Mystacodon seem to indicate that Aetiocetidae and Llanocetidae are more closely related to crown Mysticeti than to Mammalodontidae, Coronodon, and Mystacodon.
