= Maiabalaena =

Maiabalaena Temporal range: Early Oligocene, 33 Ma

Scientific classification
- Domain: Eukaryota
- Kingdom: Animalia
- Phylum: Chordata
- Class: Mammalia
- Order: Artiodactyla
- Infraorder: Cetacea
- Genus: †Maiabalaena; Peredo et al., 2018
- Species: †M. nesbittae

Binomial name
- †Maiabalaena nesbittae Peredo et al., 2018

Extinct genus of whales

Maiabalaena is an extinct genus of baleen whale from the Oligocene of Oregon 33 million years ago consisting of one species: M. nesbittae. It lacks any form of dentition, indicating that baleen whales first evolved tooth loss before evolving baleen. It was likely an efficient suction feeder. The species name is in honor of Washington state's leading paleontologist, Elizabeth Nesbitt.
