= Chonecetus =

Chonecetus Temporal range: Oligocene

Scientific classification
- Kingdom: Animalia
- Phylum: Chordata
- Class: Mammalia
- Order: Artiodactyla
- Infraorder: Cetacea
- Family: †Aetiocetidae
- Genus: †Chonecetus; Russell (1968)

Type species
- †Chonecetus sookensis

Species
- †C. sookensis

Extinct genus of mammals

Chonecetus is an extinct genus of primitive baleen whale of the family Aetiocetidae that lived in the Oligocene period. Its fossils have been found in Canada, in the northeast Pacific. It was first named by L.S. Russell in 1968, and contains one species, C. sookensis.

Like Aetiocetus, Chonecetus possessed both multicusped teeth and the nutrient foramina required for baleen. Chonecetus closely resembled a modern Mysticeti, with an elongate, streamlined body supporting a pair of paddle-shaped forelimbs, and a horizontal tail fluke strengthened by fibrous cartilage.

== Suggested further reading ==
- Marine Mammal Biology: An Evolutionary Approach By A. Rus Hoelzel. Published 2002 Blackwell Publishing. ISBN 0-632-05232-5
