= List of extinct cetaceans =

The list of extinct cetaceans features the extinct genera and species of the order Cetacea. The cetaceans (whales, dolphins and porpoises) are descendants of land-living mammals, the even-toed ungulates. The earliest cetaceans were still hoofed mammals. These early cetaceans became gradually better adapted for swimming than for walking on land, finally evolving into fully marine cetaceans.

This list currently includes fossil genera and species, and the baiji (or Chinese river dolphin, Lipotes vexillifer) was declared "functionally extinct" after an expedition in late 2006 failed to find any in the Yangtze River. Also, the Atlantic population of gray whales (Eschrichtius robustus) became extinct in the 18th century.

== Suborder Archaeoceti ==
=== Family Ambulocetidae ===
(Eocene)

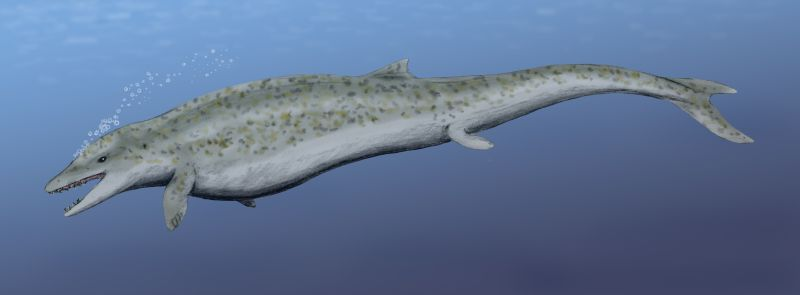
Dorudon

- Ambulocetus
- Himalayacetus
- Gandakasia

=== Family Basilosauridae ===
(Late Eocene)

- Tutcetus
- Perucetus

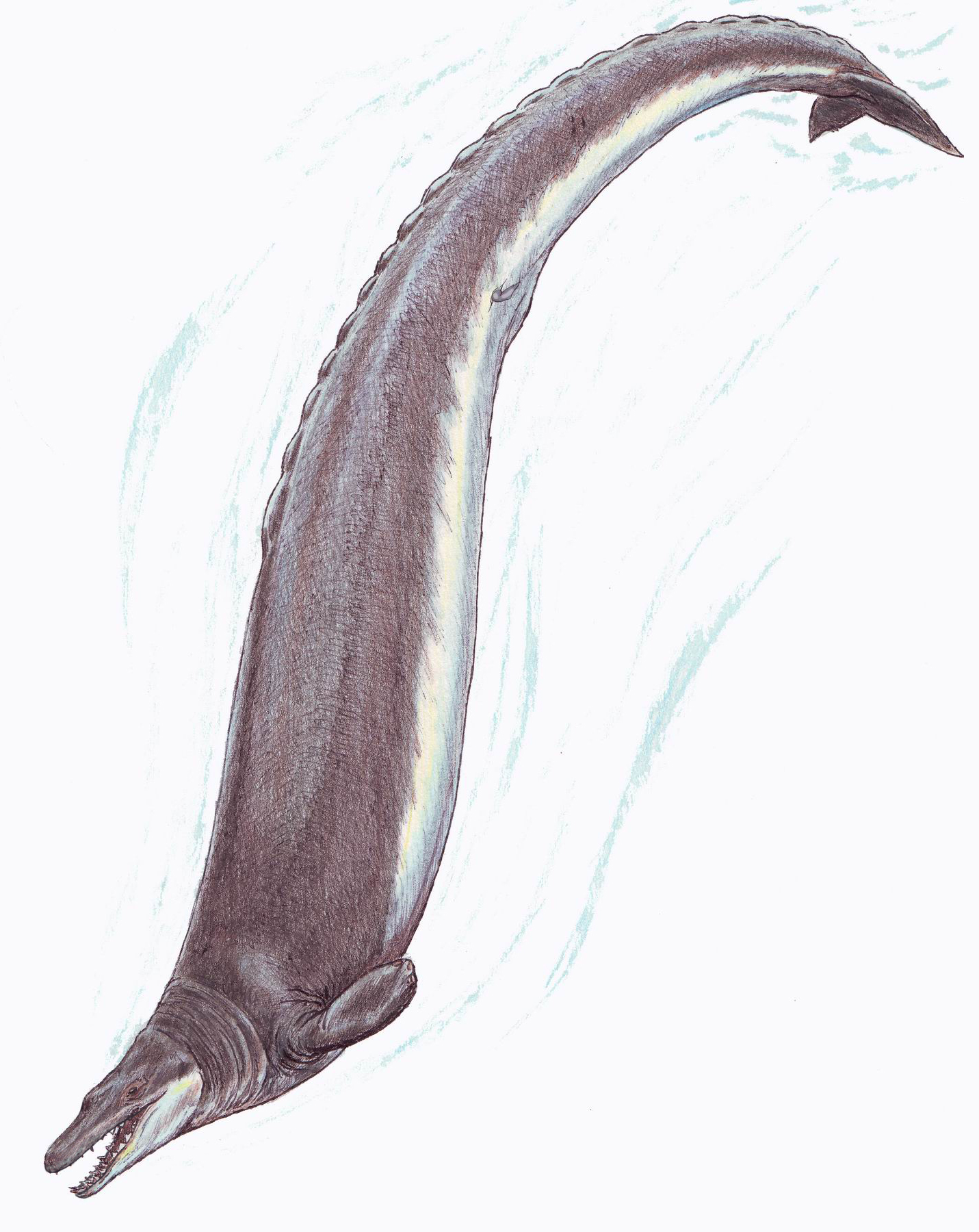
Basilosaurus cetoides reconstruction

- Basilosaurinae
  - Basilosaurus
  - Basiloterus
  - Eocetus
- Pachycetinae
  - Antaecetus
  - Pachycetus
- Dorudontinae
  - Ancalecetus
  - Chrysocetus
  - Cynthiacetus
  - Dorudon
  - Masracetus
  - Ocucajea
  - Saghacetus
  - Supayacetus
  - Zygorhiza
  - Stromerius

=== Family Kalakocetidae ===
(Early to Middle Eocene)

- Kalakocetus

=== Family Kekenodontidae ===
(Oligocene)

- Kekenodon
- Tohoraonepu

=== Family Pakicetidae ===
(Early to Middle Eocene)

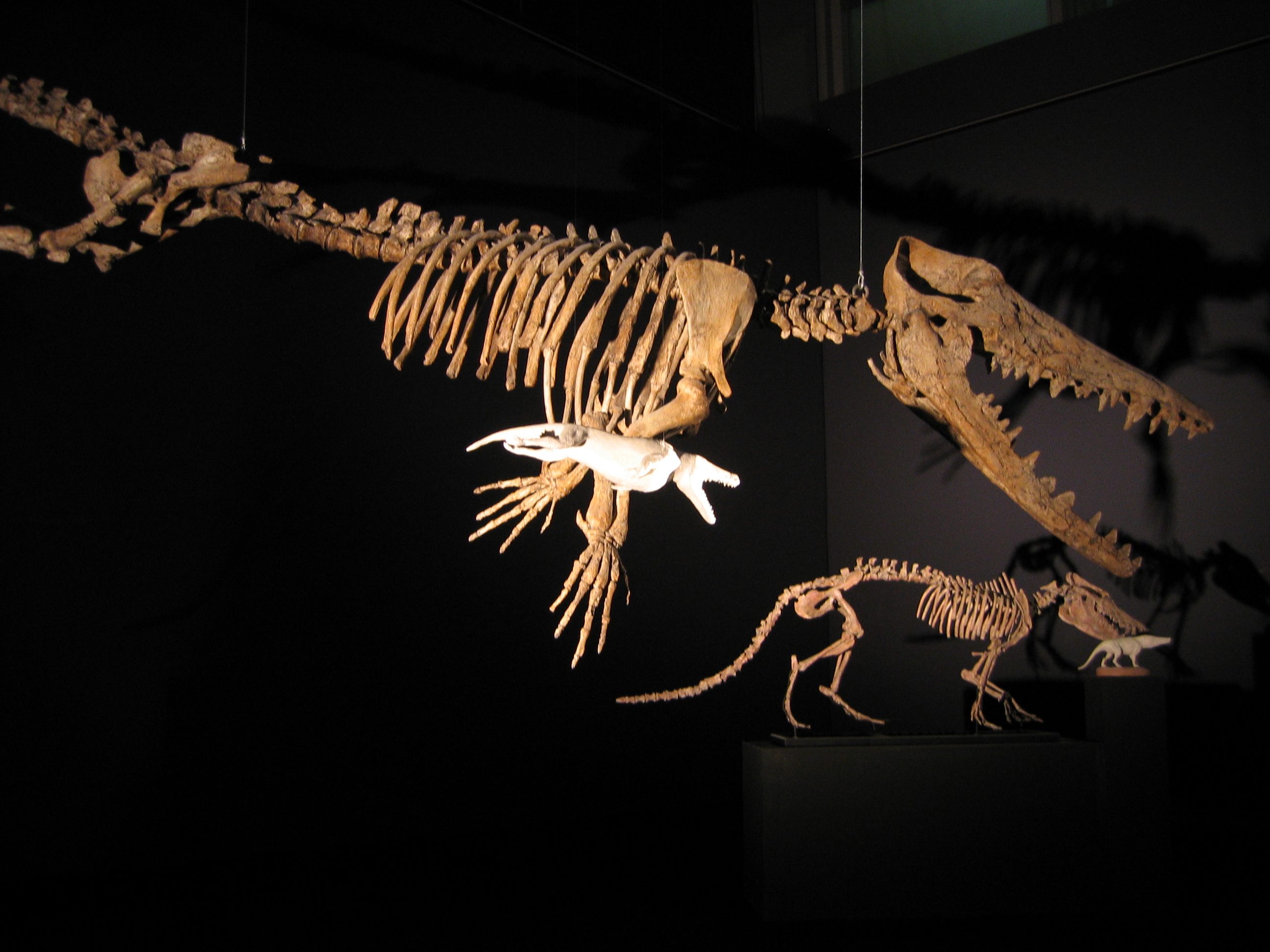
Ambulocetus skeleton in front and Pakicetus behind

- Pakicetus
- Nalacetus
- Ichthyolestes

=== Family Protocetidae ===
(Eocene)

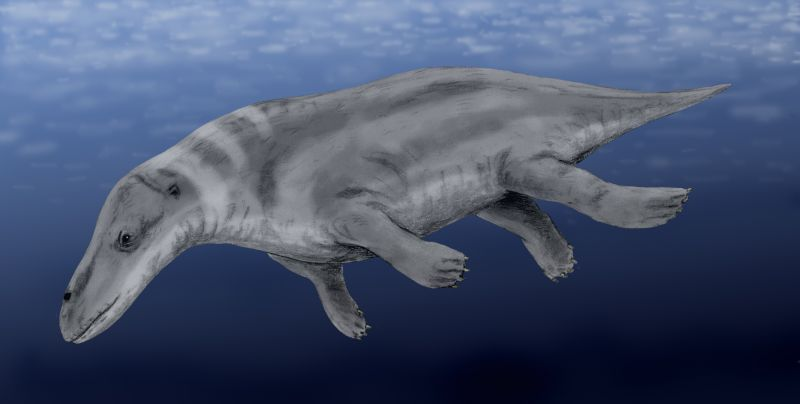
Rhodocetus kasrani reconstruction

- Georgiacetinae
  - Aegicetus
  - Babiacetus
  - Carolinacetus
  - Georgiacetus
  - Natchitochia
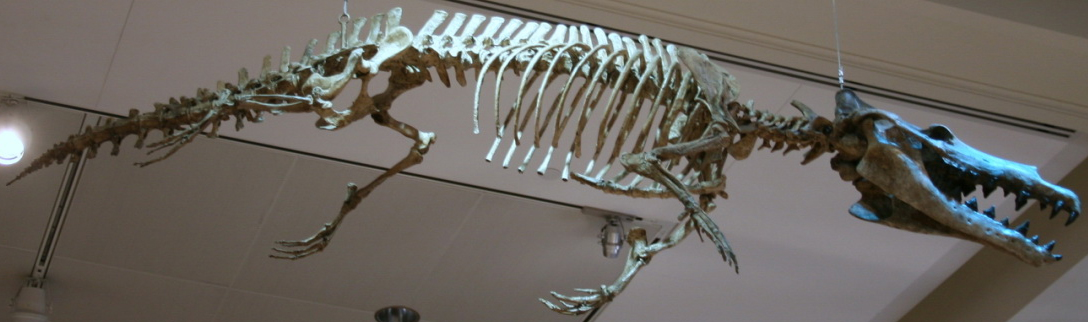
    Maiacetus skeleton
  - Pappocetus
  - Pontobasileus
  - Tupelocetus
- Makaracetinae
  - Makaracetus
- Protocetinae
  - Aegyptocetus
  - Artiocetus
  - Crenatocetus
  - Dhedacetus
  - Gaviacetus
  - Indocetus
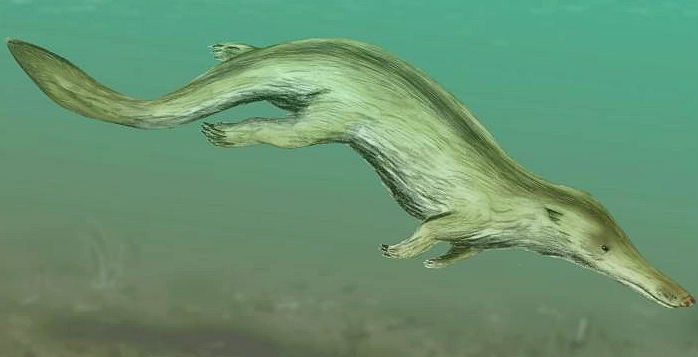
    Kutchicetus minimus reconstruction
  - Kharodacetus
  - Maiacetus
  - Peregocetus
  - Protocetus
  - Qaisracetus
  - Rodhocetus
  - Takracetus
  - Togocetus

=== Family Remingtonocetidae ===
(Eocene)

- Andrewsiphius
- Attockicetus
- Dalanistes
- Kutchicetus
- Rayanistes
- Remingtonocetus

== Suborder Mysticeti ==
=== Family Llanocetidae ===
(Late Eocene-Early Oligocene)

- Llanocetus
- Mystacodon

=== Family Mammalodontidae ===
(jr synonym Janjucetidae)

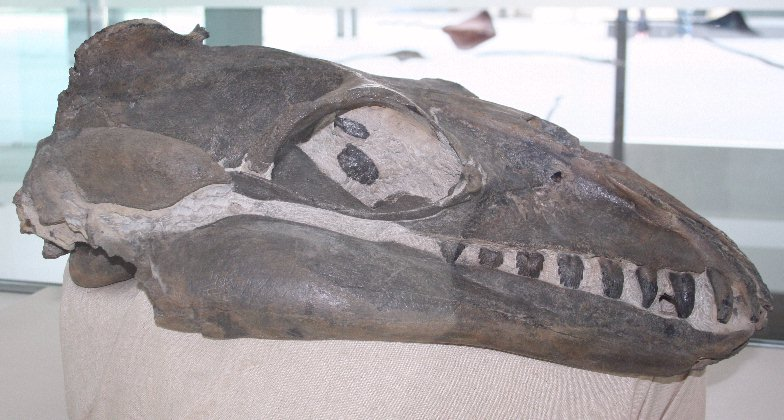
Janjucetus hunderi

(Late Oligocene)

- Janjucetus
- Mammalodon

=== Family incertae sedis ===
- Borealodon
- Coronodon

=== Family Aetiocetidae ===
(Oligocene)

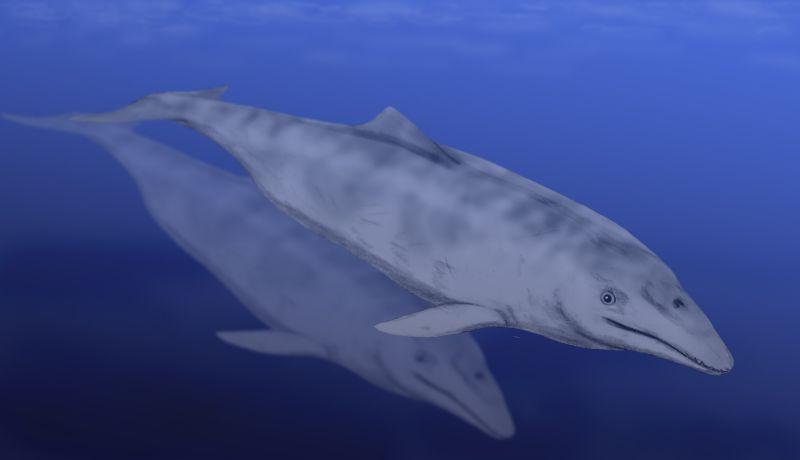
Aetiocetus restoration

- Aetiocetus
- Ashorocetus
- Chonecetus
- Fucaia
- Morawanocetus
- Niparajacetus
- Salishicetus
- Willungacetus

==== Clade Chaeomysticeti ====
- Atlanticetus

===== Family incertae sedis =====
- Horopeta
- Maiabalaena
- Sitsqwayk
- Tlaxcallicetus
- Toipahautea
- Whakakai

==== Superfamily Eomysticetoidea ====
===== Family Cetotheriopsidae =====
(Oligocene to Miocene)

- Cetotheriopsis

===== Family Eomysticetidae =====
(Oligocene to early Miocene)

- Echericetus
- Eomysticetus
- Matapanui
- Micromysticetus
- Tohoraata
- Tokarahia
- Waharoa
- Yamatocetus

===== Family Aglaocetidae =====
(Miocene)

- Aglaocetus

==== Superfamily Balaenoidea ====
===== Family Balaenidae =====
(Miocene to Recent)

- Antwerpibalaena
- Archaeobalaena
- Balaena
  - Balaena affinis
  - Balaena arcuata
  - Balaena larteti
  - Balaena macrocephalus
  - Balaena montalionis
  - Balaena ricei
- Balaenella
- Balaenotus
- Balaenula
- Charadrobalaena
- Eubalaena (extant)
  - Eubalaena ianitrix
  - Eubalaena shinshuensis
- Idiocetus
- Megabalaena
- Notiocetus
- Peripolocetus
- Protobalaena

===== Family incertae sedis =====
- Morenocetus

==== Clade Thalassotherii ====
- Cetotheriomorphus
- Heterocetus
- Imerocetus
- Isocetus
- Otradnocetus
- Palaeobalaena
- Rhegnopsis

===== Family Cetotheriidae =====
(Miocene - Pliocene)

Classification follows Steeman (2007) unless otherwise noted.

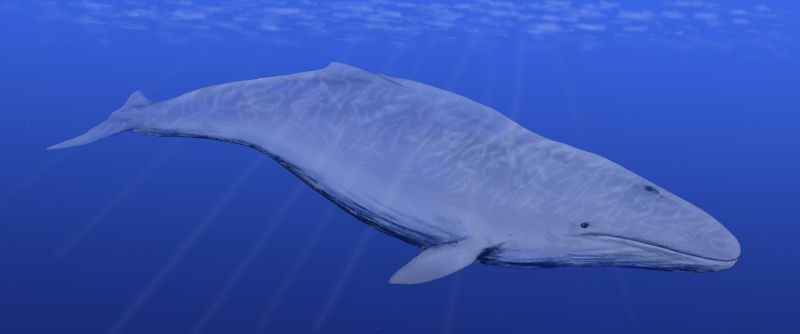
Cetotherium restoration

- Adicetus
- Brandtocetus
- Cephalotropis
- Cetotherium
- Ciuciulea
- Eucetotherium
- Halicetus
- Herentalia
- Herpetocetus
- Hibacetus
- Joumocetus
- Kurdalagonus
- Metopocetus
- Mithridatocetus
- Nannocetus
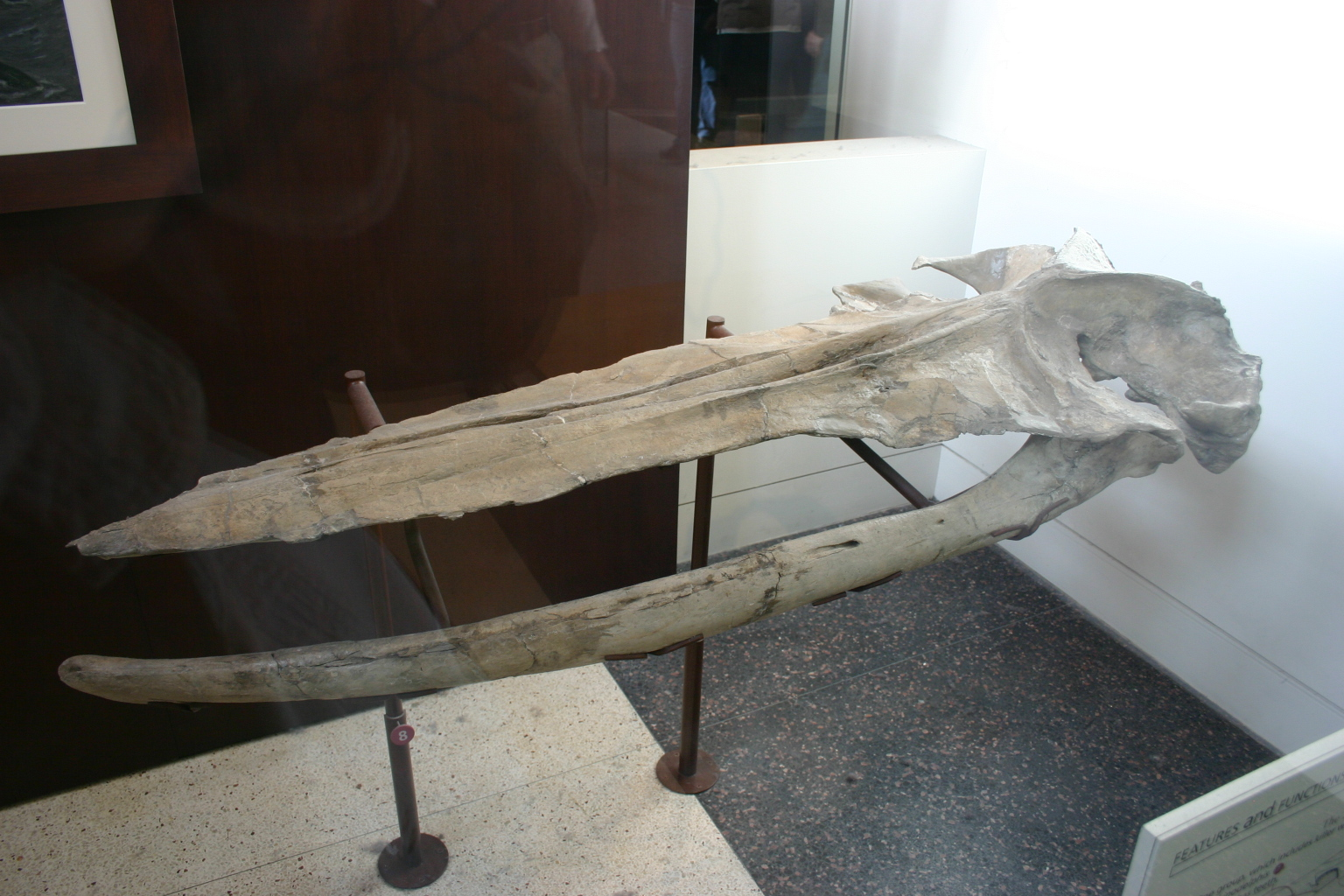
  Parietobalaena palmeri skull
- Piscobalaena
- Thinocetus
- Titanocetus
- Tiucetus
- Vampalus
- Zygiocetus

===== Family Diorocetidae =====
(Miocene to Pliocene)

- Amphicetus
- Diorocetus
- Plesiocetopsis
- Uranocetus

===== Family Neobalaenidae =====
(Miocene to Recent)

- Miocaperea

===== Family Pelocetidae =====
(Miocene)

- Cophocetus
- Parietobalaena
- Pelocetus

===== Family incertae sedis =====
- Isanacetus
- Pinocetus
- Mauicetus
- Taikicetus
- Tiphyocetus

==== Superfamily Balaenopteroidea ====
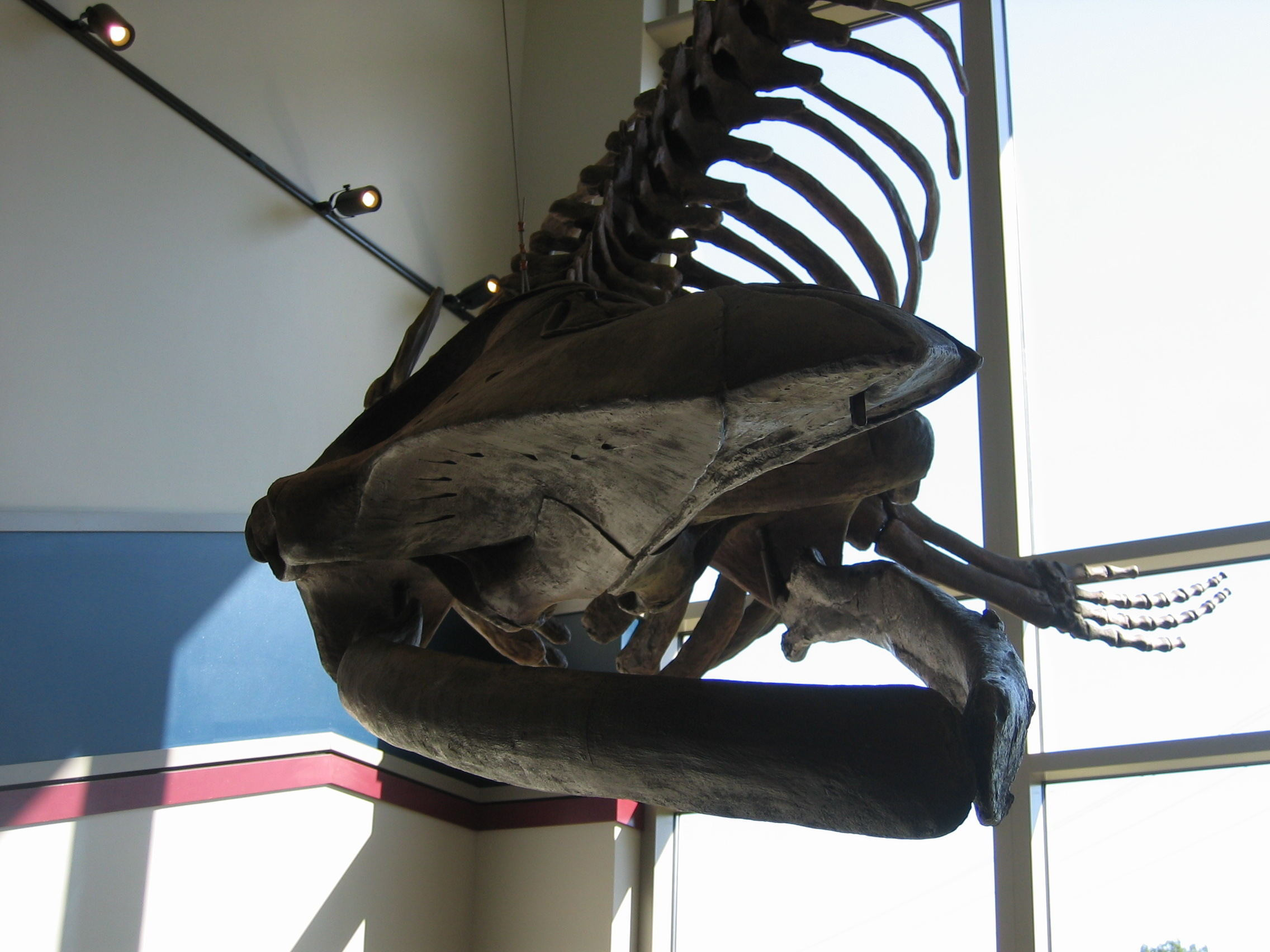
Eobalaenoptera skeleton

- Eobalaenoptera

===== Family Balaenopteridae =====
(Miocene to Recent)

- Archaebalaenoptera
- Balaenoptera (extant)
  - Balaenoptera bertae
  - Balaenoptera cephalus
  - Balaenoptera colcloughi
  - Balaenoptera davidsonii
  - Balaenoptera siberi
  - Balaenoptera sursiplana
  - Balaenoptera taiwanica
- "Balaenoptera" cortesii
- "Balaenoptera" portisi
- "Balaenoptera" ryani
- Burtinopsis
- Cetotheriophanes
- Fragilicetus
- Incakujira
- Marzanoptera
- Miobalaenoptera
- Norrisanima
- Nehalaennia
- Parabalaenoptera
- Plesiobalaenoptera
- Plesiocetus
- Praemegaptera
- Protororqualus

===== Family Eschrichtiidae =====
(Miocene to Recent)

- Archaeschrichtius
- Eschrichtioides
- Gricetoides
- Megapteropsis

===== Family Tranatocetidae =====
- Mesocetus
- Mixocetus
- Tranatocetus

===== Family incertae sedis =====
- Mioceta (nomen dubium)
- Piscocetus
- Siphonocetus (nomen dubium)
- Tretulias (nomen dubium)
- Ulias (nomen dubium)

== Suborder Odontoceti ==
=== Basal forms ===
==== Family Agorophiidae ====
(Early Oligocene)

- Agorophius

==== Family Ashleycetidae ====
(Early Oligocene)

- Ashleycetus

==== Family Patriocetidae ====
(Oligocene to Early Miocene)

- Patriocetus

==== Family Simocetidae ====
(Early Oligocene)

- Simocetus

==== Family Xenorophidae ====
(Late Oligocene)

- Albertocetus
- Archaeodelphis
- Cotylocara
- Echovenator
- Inermorostrum
- Mirocetus
- Xenorophus

==== Family Inticetidae ====
- Inticetus
- Phococetus

==== Family Squaloziphiidae ====
(Late Oligocene to Early Miocene)

- Squaloziphius
- Yaquinacetus

==== Family incertae sedis ====
- Ankylorhiza
- Agriocetus
- Atropatenocetus
- Ediscetus
- Olympicetus
- Saurocetus

=== Superfamily Squalodontoidea ===
==== Family Dalpiazinidae ====
(Late Oligocene to Miocene)

- Dalpiazina

==== Family Prosqualodontidae ====
(Late Oligocene-Middle Miocene)

- Parasqualodon
- Prosqualodon

=== Superfamily Physeteroidea ===
==== Family Kogiidae ====
(Miocene to recent)

- Aprixokogia
- Kogia (extant)
  - Kogia pusilla
  - Kogia danomurai
- Kogiopsis
- Koristocetus
- Nanokogia
- Platyscaphokogia
- Pliokogia
- Praekogia
- Scaphokogia
- Thalassocetus

==== Family Physeteridae ====
- Cozzuoliphyseter
- Eophyseter
- Ferecetotherium
- Idiophyseter
- Idiorophus
- Orycterocetus
- Physeterula
- Placoziphius
- Preaulophyseter
- Scaldicetus

==== Family incertae sedis ====
- Acrophyseter
- Albicetus
- Aulophyseter
- Brygmophyseter
- Diaphorocetus
- Eudelphis
- Hoplocetus (nomen dubium)
- Livyatan
- Miokogia (nomen dubium)
- Paleophoca (nomen dubium)
- Prophyseter (nomen dubium)
- Rhaphicetus
- Zygophyseter

=== Superfamily "Eurhinodelphinoidea" ===
==== Family Argyrocetidae ====
(Late Oligocene to Early Miocene)

- Argyrocetus
- Chilcacetus
- Macrodelphinus

==== Family Eoplatanistidae ====
(Miocene)

- Eoplatanista

==== Family Eurhinodelphinidae ====
(Late Oligocene to Late Miocene)

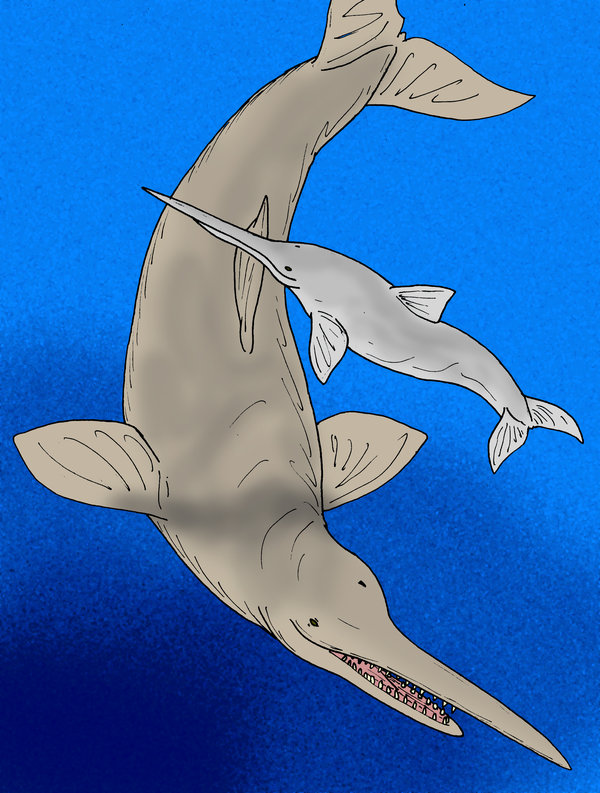
Macrodelphinus & Eurhinodelphis

- Ceterhinops
- Eurhinodelphis
- Iniopsis
- Mycteriacetus
- Phocaenopsis
- Schizodelphis
- Vanbreenia
- Xiphiacetus
- Ziphiodelphis

=== Superfamily Platanistoidea ===
- Aondelphis
- Awamokoa
- Dolgopolis
- Ensidelphis
- Perditicetus
- Urkudelphis

==== Family Allodelphinidae ====
(Late Oligocene to Middle Miocene)

- Allodelphis
- Arktocara
- Goedertius
- Ninjadelphis
- Zarhinocetus

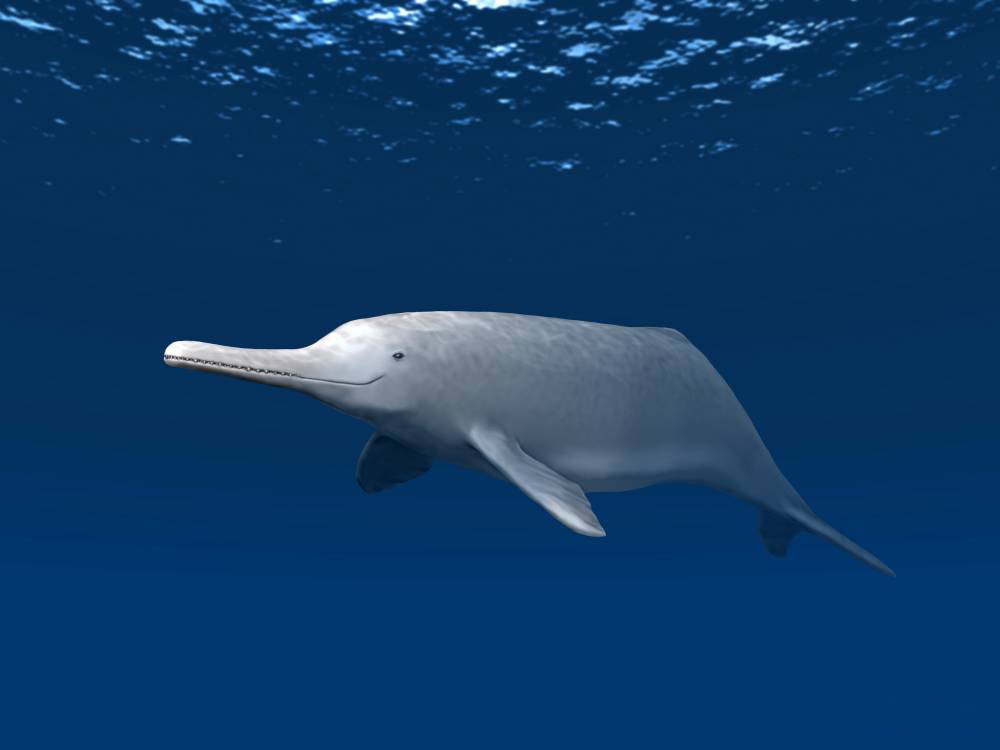
Life reconstruction of Arktocara yakataga

==== Family Platanistidae ====
(Early Miocene to Recent)

- Araeodelphis
- Dilophodelphis
- Pachyacanthus
- Pomatodelphis
- Prepomatodelphis
- Zarhachis

==== Family Squalodelphinidae ====
(Late Oligocene to Middle Miocene)

- Furcacetus
- Furcadelphis
- Huaridelphis
- Macrosqualodelphis
- Medocinia
- Notocetus
- Phocageneus
- Squalodelphis

==== Family Squalodontidae ====
(Late Oligocene to Middle Miocene)

- Austrosqualodon
- Eosqualodon
- Macrophoca
- Neosqualodon
- Pachyodon
- Phoberodon
- Squalodon (syn. Kelloggia, Rhizoprion, Crenidelphinus, Arionius, Phocodon)
- Smilocamptus
- Tangaroasaurus

==== Family Waipatiidae ====
(Late Oligocene to Early Miocene)

- ?Microcetus
- Otekaikea
- Papahu
- Sachalinocetus
- Waipatia

=== Superfamily Ziphioidea ===
==== Family Ziphiidae ====
(Miocene to Recent)

- Basal forms
  - Aporotus
  - Beneziphius
  - Chavinziphius
  - Chimuziphius
  - Choneziphius
  - Dagonodum
  - Globicetus
  - Imocetus
  - Messapicetus
  - Ninoziphius
  - Notoziphius
  - Tusciziphius
  - Ziphirostrum
- Subfamily Berardiinae
  - Archaeoziphius
  - Microberardius
- Subfamily Hyperoodontinae
  - Africanacetus
  - Belemnoziphius
  - Ihlengesi
  - Khoikhoicetus
  - Mesoplodon (extant)
    - Mesoplodon posti
    - Mesoplodon slangkopi
    - Mesoplodon tumidirostris
  - Nenga
  - Pterocetus
  - Xhosacetus
- Subfamily Ziphiinae
  - Caviziphius
  - Izikoziphius
  - Nazcacetus
- Subfamily incertae sedis
  - Anoplonassa
  - Cetorhynchus
  - Eboroziphius
  - Pelycorhamphus

=== Clade Delphinida ===
==== Family incertae sedis ====
- Anacharsis
- Belonodelphis
- Delphinavus
- Graamocetus
- Hadrodelphis
- Lamprolithax
- Leptodelphis
- Liolithax
- Lophocetus
- Loxolithax
- Macrokentriodon
- Microphocaena
- Miodelphis
- Nannolithax
- Oedolithax
- Oligodelphis
- Palaeophocaena
- Pithanodelphis
- Platylithax
- Prionodelphis
- Protodelphinus
- Sarmatodelphis
- Sophianacetus
- Tagicetus

==== Superfamily Delphinoidea ====
===== Family Albireonidae =====
(Miocene to Pliocene)

- Albireo

===== Family Delphinidae =====
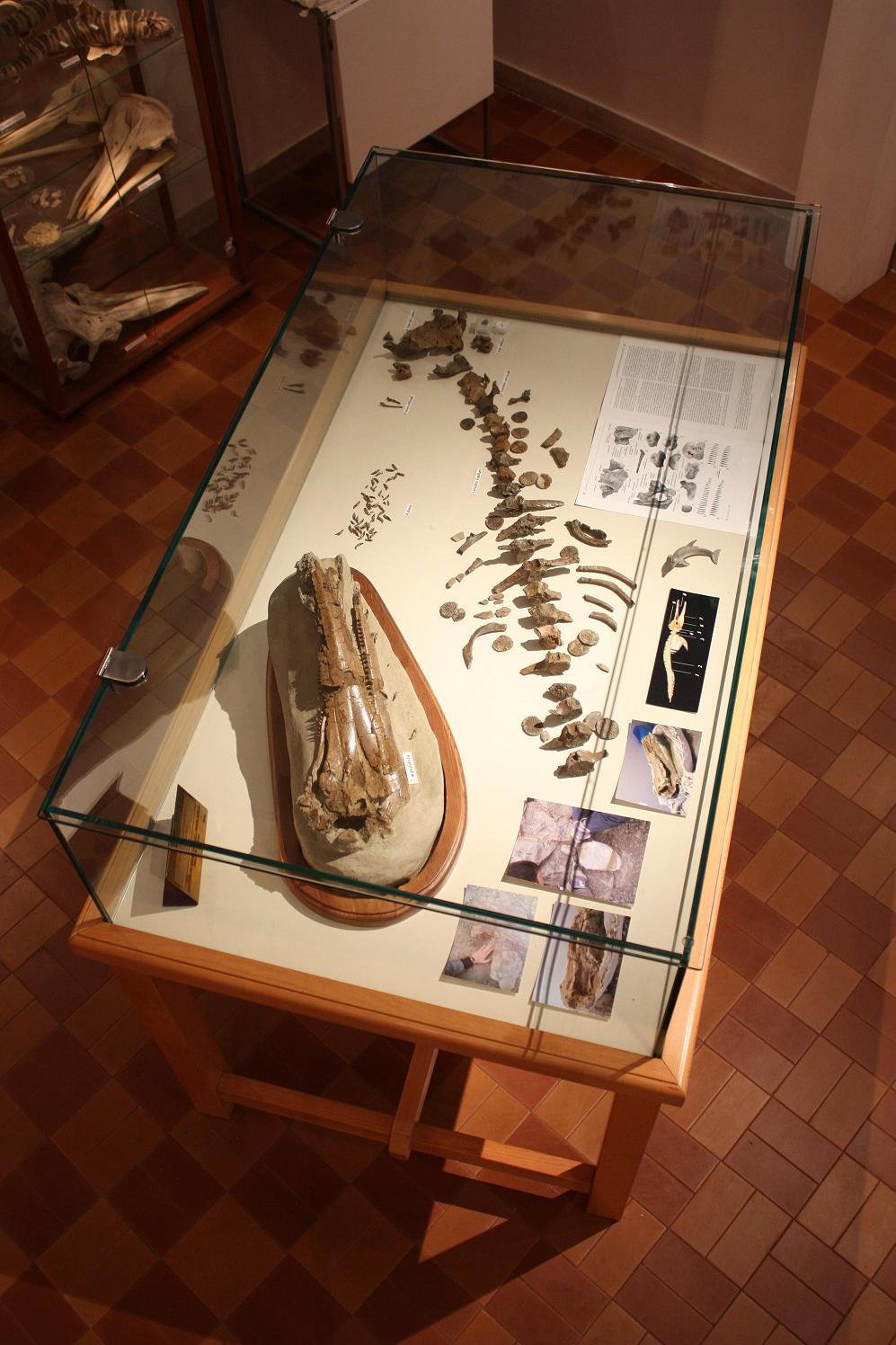
Etruridelphis giulii

(Oligocene to Recent)

- Arimidelphis
- Astadelphis
- Australodelphis
- Delphinus (extant)
  - Delphinus domeykoi
- Eodelphinus
- Etruridelphis
- Hemisyntrachelus
- Lagenorhynchus (extant)
  - Lagenorhynchus harmatuki
- Norisdelphis
- Globicephala (extant)
  - Globicephala baereckeii
  - Globicephala etruriae
- Orcinus (extant)
  - Orcinus citoniensis
  - Orcinus meyeri
  - Orcinus paleorca
- Platalearostrum
- Protoglobicephala
- Pseudorca (extant)
  - Pseudorca yokoyamai
  - Pseudorca yuanliensis
- Septidelphis
- Sinanodelphis
- Stenella (extant)
  - Stenella rayi
- Tursiops (extant)
  - Tursiops miocaenus
  - Tursiops osennae

===== Family Kentriodontidae =====
(Oligocene to Pliocene)

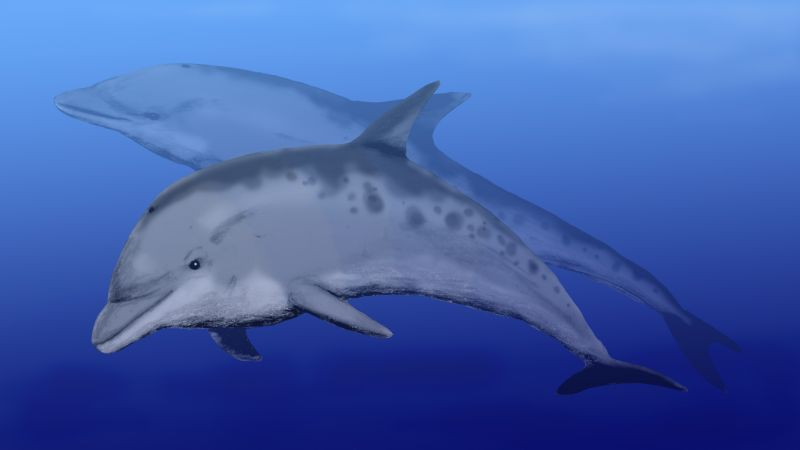
Kentriodon reconstruction

- Belonodelphis?
- Kampholophos
- Kentriodon
- Liolithax?
- Mesokentriodon
- Rudicetus
- Sophianaecetus
- Wimahl

===== Family Monodontidae =====
(Miocene to Recent)

- Bohaskaia
- Casatia
- Denebola
- Haborodelphis

===== Family Odobenocetopsidae =====
(Late Miocene to Early Pliocene)

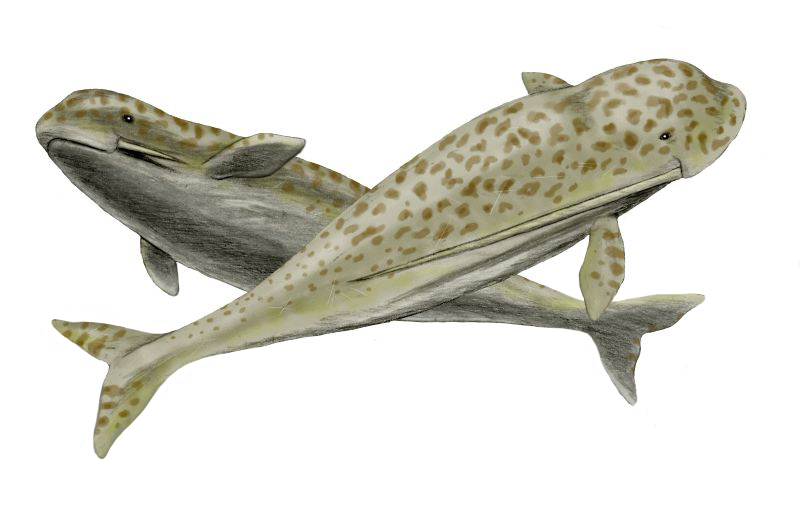
Odobenocetops reconstruction

- Odobenocetops

===== Family Phocoenidae =====
(Miocene to Recent)

- Archaeophocaena
- Australithax
- Brabocetus
- Harborophocoena
- Lomacetus
- Miophocaena
- Numataphocoena
- Piscolithax
- Pterophocaena
- Salumiphocaena
- Semirostrum
- Septemtriocetus

==== Superfamily Inioidea ====
- Awadelphis
- Brujadelphis
- Incacetus
- Meherrinia

===== Family Iniidae =====
(Miocene to Recent)

- Goniodelphis
- Hesperoinia
- Ischyrorhynchus
- Isthminia
- Kwanzacetus
- Saurocetes

===== Family Pontoporiidae =====
(Middle Miocene to Recent)

- Atocetus
- Auroracetus
- Brachydelphis
- Pliopontos
- Pontistes
- Protophocaena
- Samaydelphis
- Scaldiporia
- Stenasodelphis

==== Superfamily Lipotoidea ====
===== Family Lipotidae =====
(Late Miocene to Recent)

- Eolipotes
- Lipotes (likely extinct)
- Parapontoporia

==== Superfamily incertae sedis ====
- Delphinodon
- Heterodelphis

===== Family incertae sedis =====
- Acrodelphis
- Champsodelphis
- Hesperocetus
- Imerodelphis (Miocene)
- Kharthlidelphis
- Lonchodelphis
- Macrochirifer
- Microsqualodon
- Pelodelphis
- Rhabdosteus (nomen dubium)
- Sulakocetus

== See also ==
- Evolution of cetaceans
- List of cetaceans
- List of prehistoric mammals
- Lists of extinct species
