= Albacetus =

Albacetus Temporal range: Miocene (Tortonian-Messinian) 8.4–7.8 Ma

Scientific classification
- Kingdom: Animalia
- Phylum: Chordata
- Class: Mammalia
- Infraclass: Placentalia
- Order: Artiodactyla
- Infraorder: Cetacea
- Family: Cetotheriidae
- Genus: †Albacetus; Bisconti et al., 2025

Type species
- †Albacetus salvifactus Bisconti et al., 2025

Extinct genus of baleen whale

Albacetus is an extinct genus of cetotheriid baleen whale from the Late Miocene of Piedmont, Italy. The type species, A. salvifactus, was named by Michelangelo Bisconti and colleagues in 2025. The holotype specimen, MCEA G1621, includes a partial skull and natural casts of various cranial elements, with partial cervical and thoracic vertebrae and ribs still enclosed in cavities in the matrix block. The generic name Albacetus refers to the town located nearest to the site of discovery: Alba. The specific name is the adjective salvifactus, which means "saved": this relates to the urgent excavation that saved the holotype specimen from being destroyed.

A phylogenetic analysis conducted by the authors found the animal within the family Cetotheriidae: a group of potentially extinct (Note: Depending on the placement of the pygmy right whale (Caperea marginata), which has been recovered within and outside of this group since 2013.) baleen whales that originated in the Oligocene. The analysis places Albacetus in a clade with several taxa from the North Atlantic, Mediterranean and Paratethys Basins, including Herentalia, Brandtocetus and Ciuciulea.
