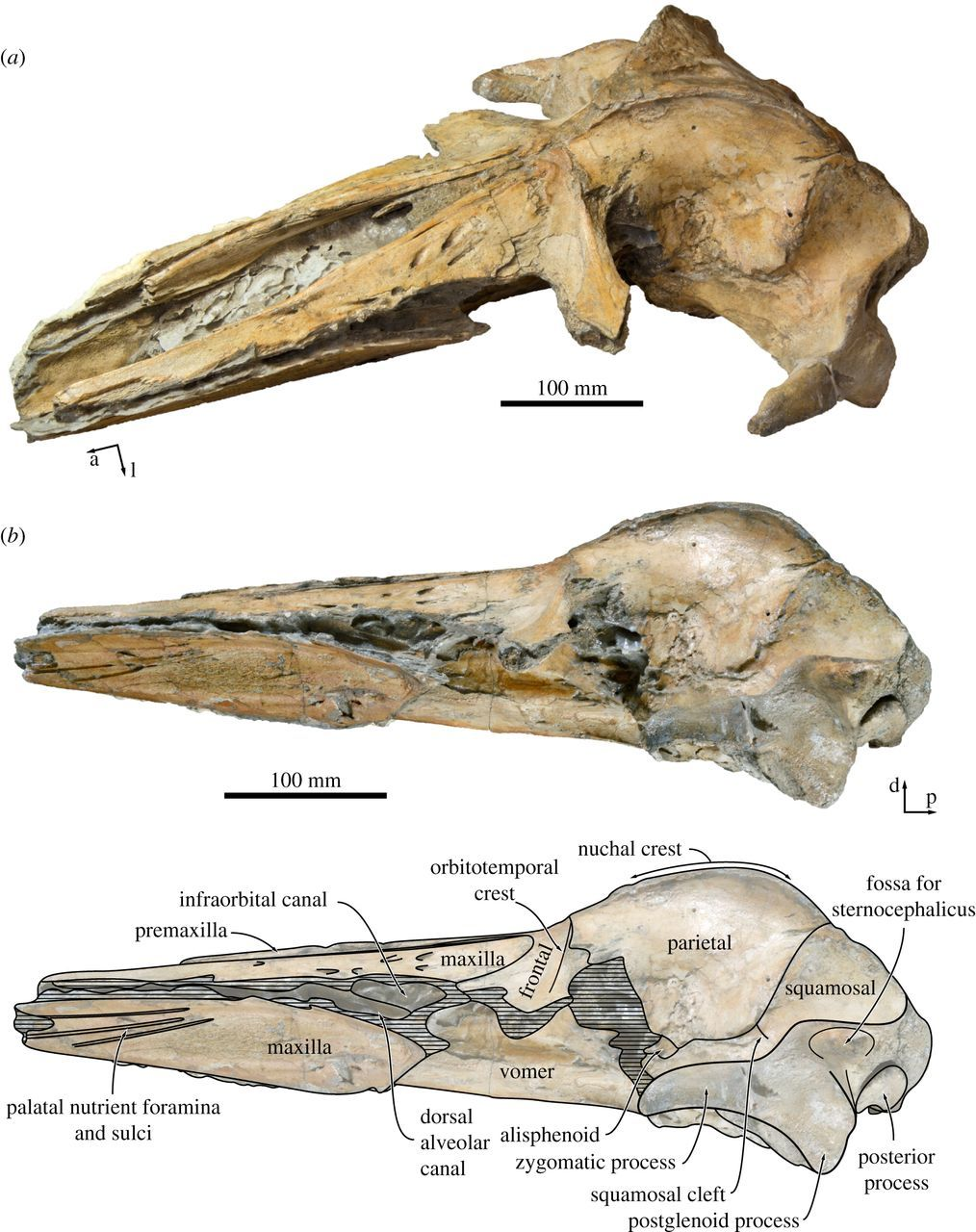
- Holotype skull in lateral view

Scientific classification
- Kingdom: Animalia
- Phylum: Chordata
- Class: Mammalia
- Infraclass: Placentalia
- Order: Artiodactyla
- Infraorder: Cetacea
- Family: Cetotheriidae
- Genus: †Tiucetus; Marx, Lambert & De Muizon 2017

= Tiucetus =

Tiucetus Temporal range: Tortonian ~11–9 Ma

Extinct genus of whales

Tiucetus is an extinct genus of cetotheriid baleen whale known from the Late Miocene Pisco Formation of Peru.

== Description ==
Tiucetus is distinct from other cetotheriids in having a squamosal cleft; from eomysticetids in having comparatively short nasals, a more anteriorly projected supraoccipital and parietal, and a tympanic bulla that is rotated so that the inner posterior prominence faces dorsally.

== Classification ==
Tiucetus falls basally in Cetotheriidae, less derived than Joumocetus and Cephalotropis.

== Palaeogeography ==
Other marine mammals found in the Pisco Formation include another cetotheriid, Piscobalaena, the odd dolphin Odobenocetops, the killer sperm whale Acrophyseter, the long-necked seal Acrophoca, and aquatic sloth Thalassocnus.

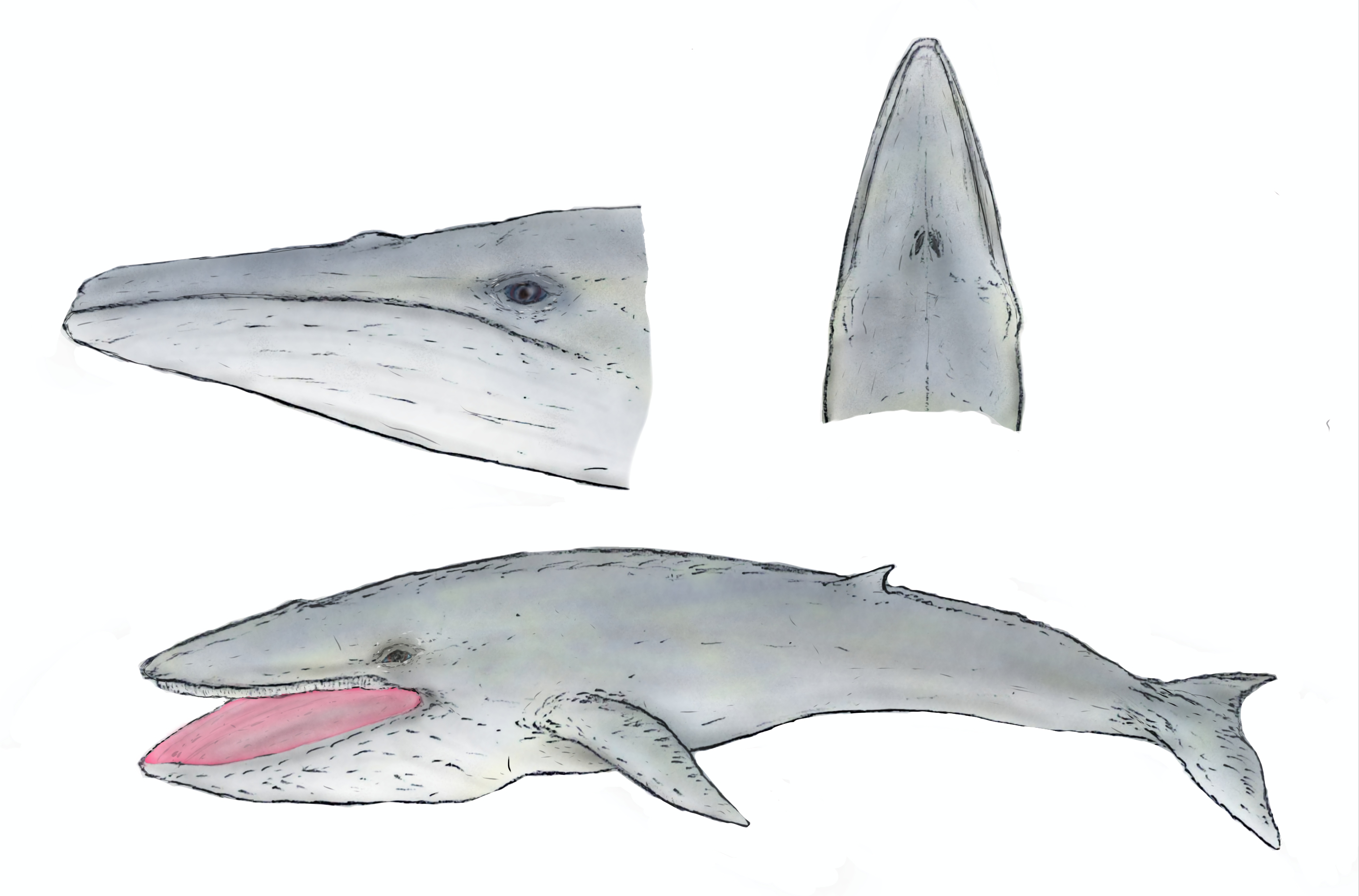
Life reconstruction
