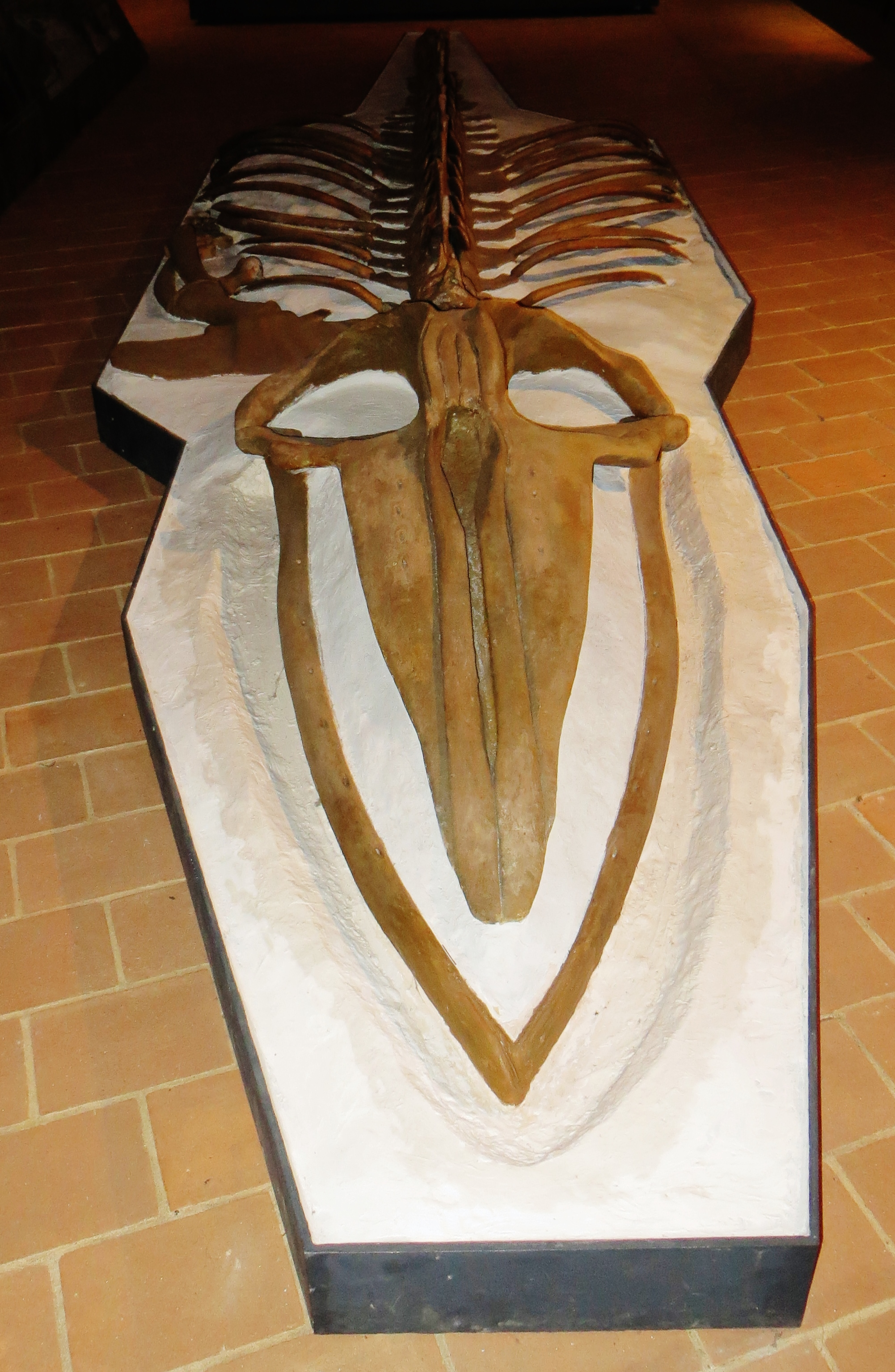
- Skeleton

Scientific classification
- Domain: Eukaryota
- Kingdom: Animalia
- Phylum: Chordata
- Class: Mammalia
- Order: Artiodactyla
- Infraorder: Cetacea
- Family: Balaenopteridae
- Genus: †Protororqualus; Bisconti 2007

Species
- †P. cuverii [originally Balaena] (type); Fischer 1829

= Protororqualus =

Protororqualus Temporal range: Pliocene, 3.6-2.588 Ma

Extinct genus of mammals

Protororqualus is a genus of extinct rorqual from the late Pliocene (Piacenzian, 3.6 to 2.6 Ma) of Mount Pulgnasco, Italy (45.1°N 9.7°E: paleocoordinates 45.0°N 9.6°E).

The analysis made by Bisconti 2007 identified Protororqualus as a late representative of the rorquals which survived in the Mediterranean at least until the late Pliocene. This would indicate that the Mediterranean Basin played a vital role in preserving primitive rorquals, while more derived forms established themselves in other oceans.

== Anatomy ==
The Mount Pulgnasco specimen represents an early rorqual that fed differently from modern species. Compared to the laterally bowed dentaries of the latter, its dentary is more straight, which should have made it impossible to perform the intermittent ram feeding seen in modern rorquals. Another primitive character is that the anterior border of the supraoccipital is triangular and pointed like in Miocene Cetotheriidae.

== Taxonomic history ==
The type species, Protorqualus cuvierii, was originally described in 1829 as a species of Balaena, but later transferred to the Belgian genus Plesiocetus. Following synonymy of Plesiocetus with Balaenoptera, B. cuvieri was considered a species of Balaenoptera, although some authors treated it as a species of Cetotherium. Later work, however, showed that the Mount Pulgnasco skeleton was generically distinct from other fossil and extant rorquals to warrant its own genus.
