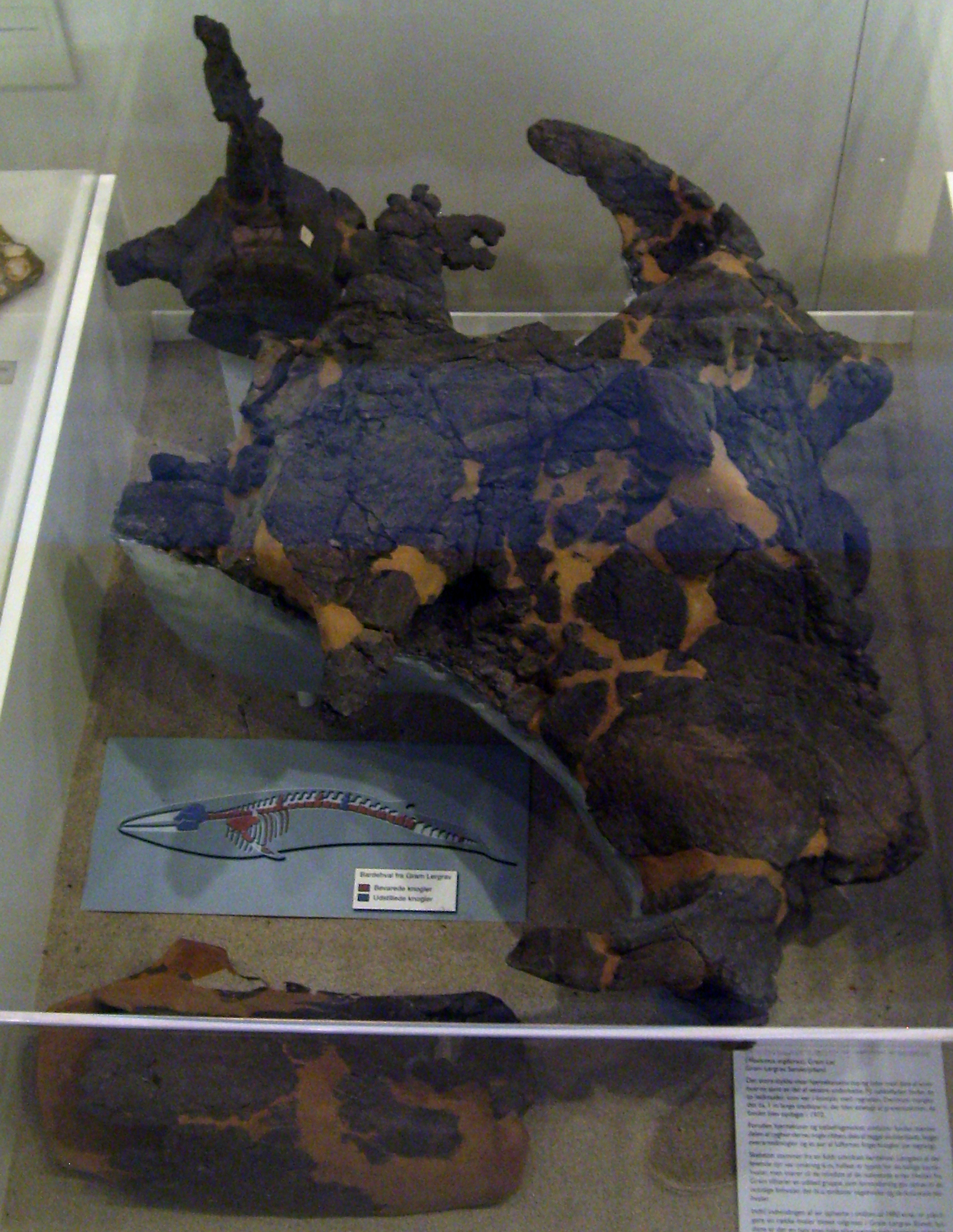
- Tranatocetus argillarius holotype at the Geological Museum in Copenhagen

Scientific classification
- Kingdom: Animalia
- Phylum: Chordata
- Class: Mammalia
- Order: Artiodactyla
- Infraorder: Cetacea
- Family: †Tranatocetidae
- Genus: †Tranatocetus; Gol'din and Steeman, 2015

Type species
- †Tranatocetus argillarius (Roth, 1978)

Synonyms
- Mesocetus argillarius Roth, 1978

= Tranatocetus =

Tranatocetus Temporal range: Late Miocene, 9.6–8 Ma

Extinct genus of mammals

Tranatocetus is an extinct genus of mysticete from the late Miocene (Tortonian) of Jutland, Denmark. The type and only species is Tranatocetus argillarius.

== Description ==
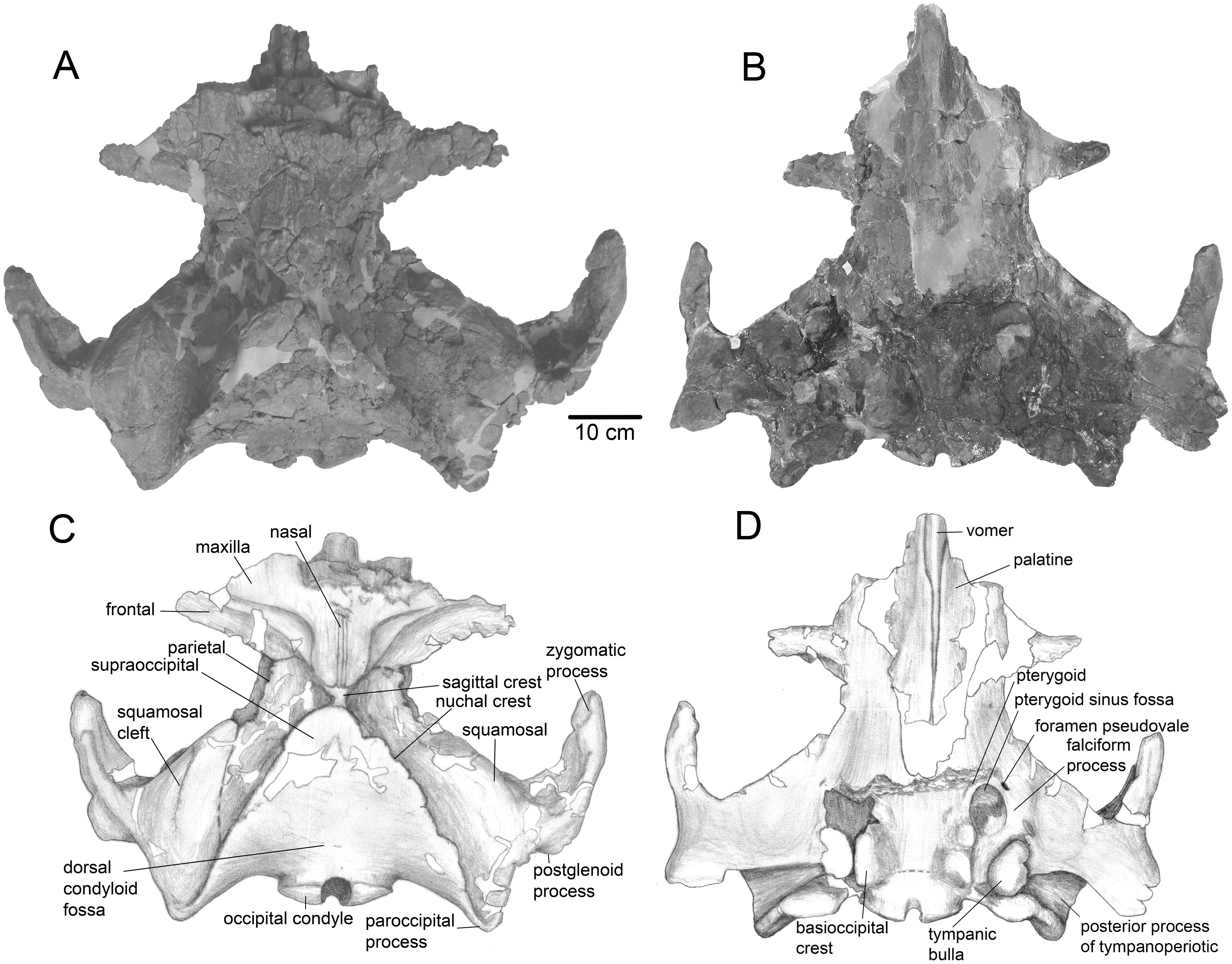
Skull of the holotype specimen

Tranatocetus is similar to "Cetotherium" megalophysum, Adicetus, Mesocetus, and Mixocetus in having rostral bones that override the frontals and contact the parietals, nasals dividing the maxillae on the vertex, a dorsoventrally bent occipital shield with a more horizontal anterior portion and more vertical posterior portion, and a tympanic bulla with short, narrow anterior portion with rounded or squared anterior end and wider and higher posterior portion that is particularly swollen in the posteroventral area. Like other tranatocetids, the skull vertex of Tranatocetus is X-shaped in dorsal view. However, Tranatocetus differs in having a wide skull with laterally expanded squamosals, straight ascending processes of maxillae which extend parallel to each other (rather than tapering and converging posteriorly), small lateral projection of the posterior meatal crest on the posterolateral side of the postglenoid process and paroccipital processes extending far posterior to the occipital condyles.

== Classification ==
Tranatocetus was originally classified as a member of the thalassothere family Tranatocetidae, which includes a number of mysticetes more closely related to Balaenopteroidea than to Cetotheriidae.

When first described, Tranatocetus was erected as a new species of Mesocetus, M. argillarius. However, a detailed redescription of this species found it to be generically distinct from Mesocetus proper, necessitating its recognition as a new genus.

The phylogenetic analysis conducted by Marx et al. (2019) recovered Tranatocetus deeply nested within the family Cetotheriidae, as sister taxon to Metopocetus.
