= Zygiocetus =

Zygiocetus Temporal range: Miocene

Scientific classification
- Domain: Eukaryota
- Kingdom: Animalia
- Phylum: Chordata
- Class: Mammalia
- Order: Artiodactyla
- Infraorder: Cetacea
- Family: Cetotheriidae
- Genus: †Zygiocetus; Tarasenko, 2014
- Species: †Z. nartorum

Binomial name
- †Zygiocetus nartorum Tarasenko, 2014

Extinct genus of whales

Zygiocetus is an extinct genus of cetotheriid mysticete in the subfamily Cetotheriinae. The type and only species is Zygiocetus nartorum, known from the Late Miocene (Messinian) of Adygea in the Russian Caucasus.

Zygiocetus nartorum is distinguished from other cetotheriines in having slightly arched lambdoid crests, and it is distinct from Cetotherium and Kurdalagonus in having a wide supraoccipital that is shaped like an extended isosceles triangle with arched lateral sides.
