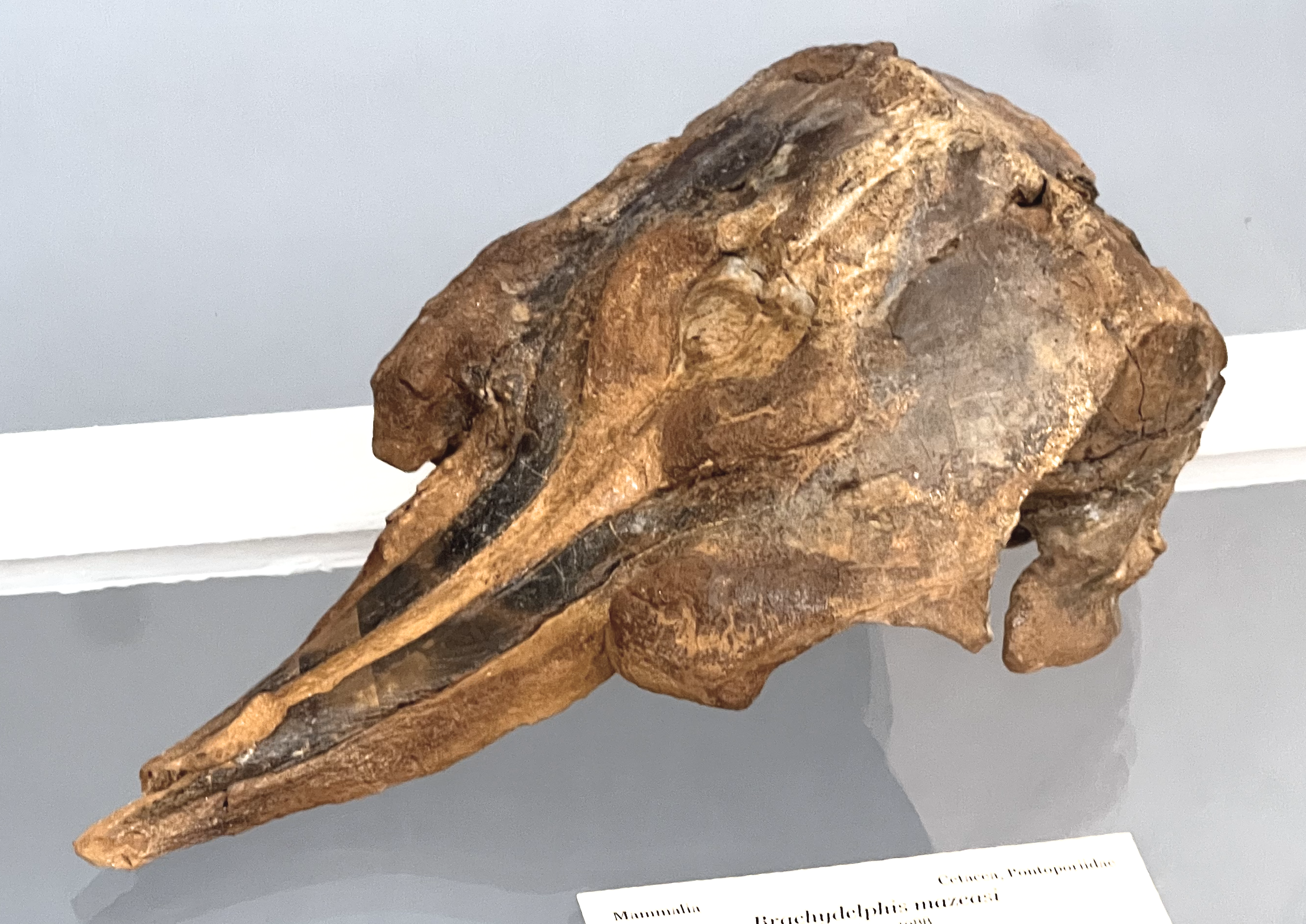
- B. mazeasi skull (MNHN.F.PPI266) at the National Museum of Natural History, France

Scientific classification
- Domain: Eukaryota
- Kingdom: Animalia
- Phylum: Chordata
- Class: Mammalia
- Order: Artiodactyla
- Infraorder: Cetacea
- Family: Pontoporiidae
- Genus: †Brachydelphis; De Muizon 1988

Species
- B. jahuayensis Lambert & De Muizon 2013; B. mazeasi De Muizon 1988 (type)

= Brachydelphis =

Brachydelphis Temporal range: Late Miocene ~11–5.3 Ma

Extinct genus of whales

Brachydelphis is a genus of pontoporiid known from the Late Miocene Pisco Formation of Peru and the Bahía Inglesa Formation of Chile.

== Taxonomy ==
Two species are recognized, B. jahuayensis and B. mazeasi. B. mazeasi has a shortened rostrum that gives Brachydelphis its name, B. jahuayensis differs from the type species in having a longer snout and higher tooth count.

== Biology ==
Brachydelphis mazeasi was capable of suction-feeding judging from its short rostrum, but the longer rostrum of B. jahauyensis allowed it to capture small prey items.

== See also ==
- Evolution of cetaceans
- List of cetaceans
- List of extinct cetaceans
