= Otradnocetus =

Otradnocetus Temporal range: Miocene, 16.2–15.3 Ma

Scientific classification
- Domain: Eukaryota
- Kingdom: Animalia
- Phylum: Chordata
- Class: Mammalia
- Order: Artiodactyla
- Infraorder: Cetacea
- Parvorder: Mysticeti
- Superfamily: Cetotherioidea
- Genus: †Otradnocetus; Mchedlidze, 1984

Species
- O. virodovi (type)Mchedlize, 1984

Extinct genus of whales

Otradnocetus is an extinct genus of baleen whale from the middle Miocene (late Burdigalian to early Serravallian) of the Russian Caucasus.

== Taxonomy ==
Otradnocetus was described by the Georgian paleontologist Guram Mchedlidze in 1984 on the basis of GNM CO 1–90, a partial skeleton including the incomplete skull, mandible, 43 vertebrae and both forelimbs (humeri, radii, ulnae, a few carpals, metacarpals, and phalanges) with scapulae. The type specimen was found in Otradnaya, in the northwestern Russian Caucasus Mchedlidze assigned Otradnocetus to the family Cetotheriidae, at the time a wastebasket for baleen-bearing mysticetes that did belong to any crown-group mysticete group (followed by McKenna and Bell 1997). Later recognition of Cetotheriidae sensu McKenna and Bell (1997) as paraphyletic/polyphyletic rendered the systematic position of Otradnocetus, and the cladistic analyses of Gol'din & Steeman (2015) and Gol'din (2018) recovered Otradnocetus as sister to Parietobalaena securis in a clade basal to Cetotheriidae and a clade formed by Pinocetus, Cephalotropis, and Neobalaenidae. The juvenile specimen VSEGEI 2401, referred to Cetotherium aff. mayeri by Riabinin (1934) and also found in the Middle Miocene of the Russian Caucasus, was referred to Otradnocetus by Gol'din (2018).

== Description ==
Otradnocetus is a medium-size cetothere 4-5 meters in length. It differs from other members of Cetotherioidea and is most similar to Parietobalaena in having a very short ascending process of the maxilla, a short lateral process of the maxilla, an anterior end of nasal located anterior to the rostrum base, and a supraorbital process of the frontal bone directed perpendicular to the anteroposterior axis of the skull. Differences from Parietobalaena include a supraorbital process of the frontal bone not elongated at the lateral end and a robust medially bent coronoid process of the mandible.
