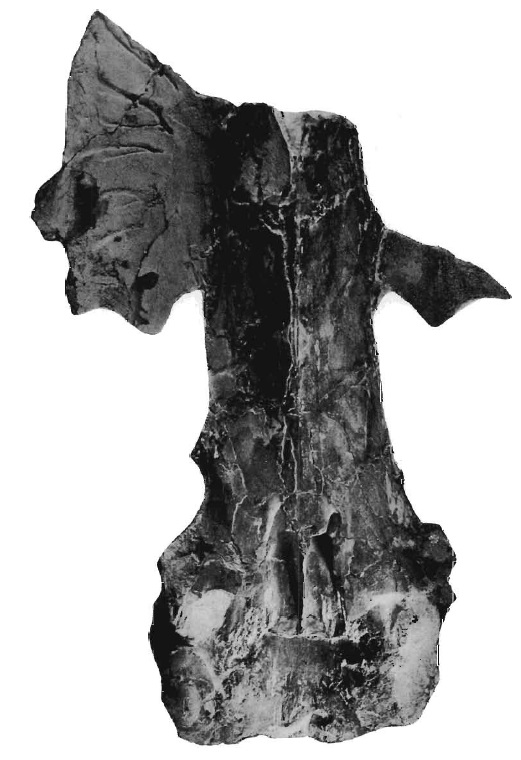
- Partial holotype skull

Scientific classification
- Domain: Eukaryota
- Kingdom: Animalia
- Phylum: Chordata
- Class: Mammalia
- Order: Artiodactyla
- Infraorder: Cetacea
- Family: Cetotheriidae
- Genus: †Pinocetus; Czyzewska & Ryziewicz, 1976

Species
- P. polonicus

= Pinocetus =

Pinocetus Temporal range: Miocene 16–13.8 Ma

Extinct genus of whales

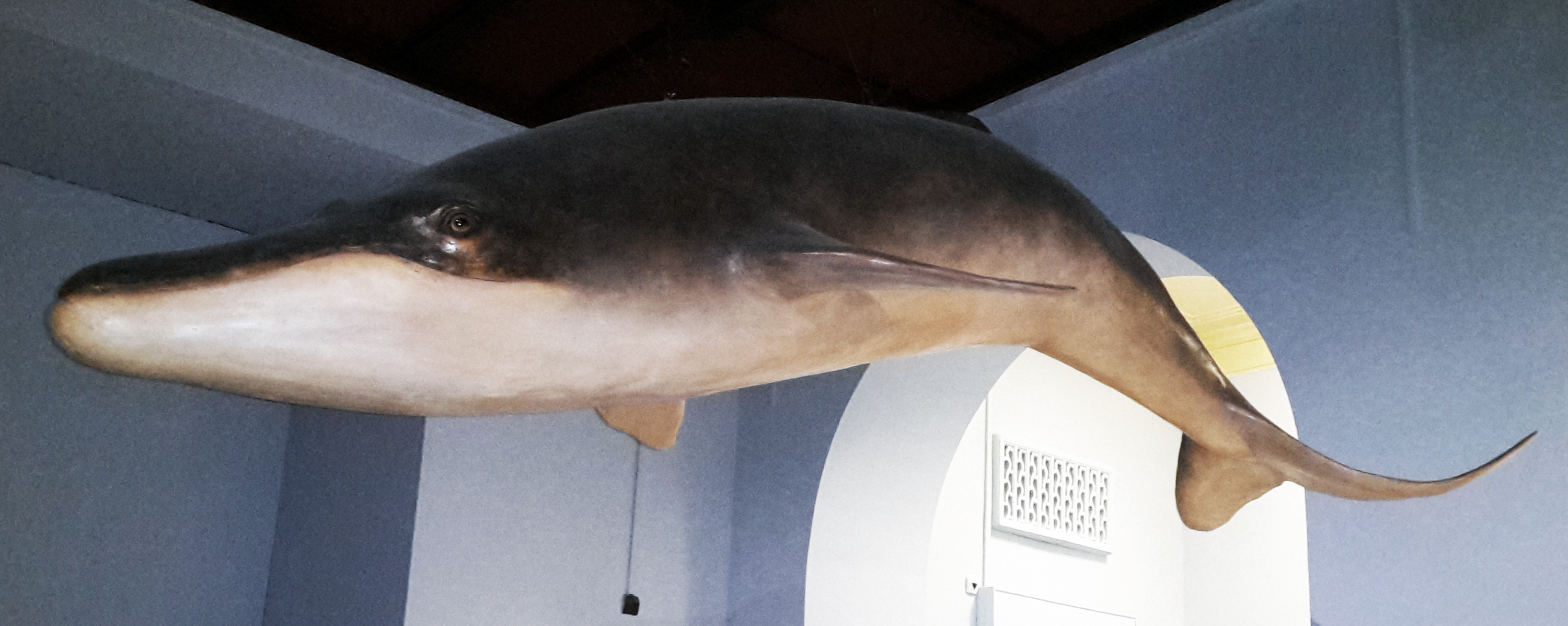
Model, Museum of Evolution of Polish Academy of Sciences, Warsaw

Pinocetus is an extinct genus of baleen whale, belonging to the family Cetotheriidae.
