= Joumocetus =

Joumocetus Temporal range: Serravallian

Scientific classification
- Kingdom: Animalia
- Phylum: Chordata
- Class: Mammalia
- Order: Artiodactyla
- Infraorder: Cetacea
- Family: Cetotheriidae
- Genus: †Joumocetus; Kimura & Hasegawa, 2010
- Species: †J. shimizui

Binomial name
- †Joumocetus shimizui Kimura & Hasegawa, 2010

Extinct genus of mammals

Joumocetus is a genus of extinct baleen whale in the family Cetotheriidae containing the single species Joumocetus shimizui. The species is known only from a partial skeleton found in Miocene age sediments of Japan.

== History and classification ==
Joumocetus shimizui was described from a mostly complete cranium and associated portions of both mandibles, cervical and thoracic vertebrae. The skeleton was recovered from an outcrop of the earliest late Miocene, Serravallian age Haraichi Formation exposed along the Kabura River near Yoshii, Gunma Prefecture, Japan (36.3°N 139.0°E, paleocoordinates 37.8°N 137.2°E). The Haraichi Formation includes several tuff layers which have been used for dating. The type skeleton was found between the older Baba tuff and the younger Kamikoizawa tuff. Biotite specimens taken from the Baba tuff have yielded an ^{40}argon–^{39}argon date of 11.26 million years ago, while sanidine specimens gave a ^{40}argon–^{39}argon date of 11.29 million years ago. The overlying Kamikoizawa tuff has not been dated, sedimentation rates have been used to estimate an age of the earliest late Miocene.

Two other Cetotheriidae genera are known from sediments older than Joumocetus, however the validity of the placement for those fossils has been questioned. The Early Miocene species Heterocetus brevifrons from the Netherlands is known from a poor specimen and lacks many diagnostic features. The other described species in Heterocetus are from the early middle Miocene to Pliocene leaving a distinct age gap. The second oldest species Cetotherium furlongi, from the middle Miocene of California, has been questioned as to its placement in the genus and family. Similar to the lack of diagnostic features in H. brevifrons, the skull from the C. furlongi type specimen is lost, making taxonomic placement questionable. If the two species are excluded, it would make Joumocetus shimizui the oldest occurrence of a cetotheriid in the fossil record.

The genus and species is known from only the holotype, number GMNH-PV-240 which is currently preserved in the paleontology collections housed at the Gunma Museum of Natural History in Gunma, Gunma Prefecture, Japan. The specimens were studied by paleontologists Toshiyuki Kimura and Yoshikazu Hasegawa, both of the Gunma Museum of Natural History. Kimura and Hasegawa published their 2010 type description for J. shimizui in the Journal of Vertebrate Paleontology. They coined the generic name Joumocetus as a combination of an older district name, "Joumo" and the Latin cetus meaning "whale". The etymology of the chosen specific name shimizui is in recognition of Masaru Shimizu who originally found the specimen and donated it to the Gunma Museum of Natural History.

== Description ==
The skull of Joumocetus shimizui is over 755 millimetres (29.7 in) long with over 60% being composed of the rostrum. The deep V-shaped patterning of the rostrum is considered a primitive trait of the cetotheriids. The V-shape forms a shallower wedge than is seen in other members of the family. The widely exposed parietals and interparietal in Joumocetus form a sagittal crest which is distinct and longer than that seen in other cetotheriids.
