= Adicetus =

Adicetus Temporal range: Miocene (Tortonian), 10 Ma

Scientific classification
- Kingdom: Animalia
- Phylum: Chordata
- Class: Mammalia
- Order: Artiodactyla
- Infraorder: Cetacea
- Family: Cetotheriidae
- Genus: †Adicetus; Figueiredo et al., 2024

Type species
- †Cetotherium vandelli Van Beneden & Gervais, 1871

Other species
- †A. latus Kellogg 1941

Extinct genus of baleen whale

Adicetus is an extinct genus of baleen whale from the Miocene of Almada, Portugal. The type species, A. vandelli, was originally named by Pierre-Joseph Van Beneden and Paul Gervais in 1871 and assigned to the genus Cetotherium. The second species belonging to the genus, A. latus, was named by Kellogg in 1941 as Aulocetus latus. Following a redescription of the material in 2024, the species were assigned to the newly coined genus Adicetus by Rodrigo Figueiredo and colleagues. A. vandelli and A. latus are both known from a single skull, both of which were found during a gold expedition at Adiça beach, and first described by Alexandre Vandelli in 1831, although he did not establish any new species for the material.
