= Vampalus =

Vampalus Temporal range: Miocene

Scientific classification
- Domain: Eukaryota
- Kingdom: Animalia
- Phylum: Chordata
- Class: Mammalia
- Order: Artiodactyla
- Infraorder: Cetacea
- Family: Cetotheriidae
- Genus: †Vampalus; Tarasenko and Lopatin, 2012

Species
- †V. sayasanicus Tarasenko and Lopatin, 2012 (type)

Extinct genus of mammals

Vampalus is a genus of cetotheriid mysticete from Miocene (Tortonian) marine deposits in the Russian Caucasus. The type species, V. sayasanicus, is based on PIN 5341/1, a complete skeleton. The cetotheriid Eucetotherium helmersonii was mistakenly assigned to Vampalus by Tarasenko and Lopatin, who were unaware that Kellogg (1931) fixed "Cetotherium" helmersonii as the Eucetotherium type species.
