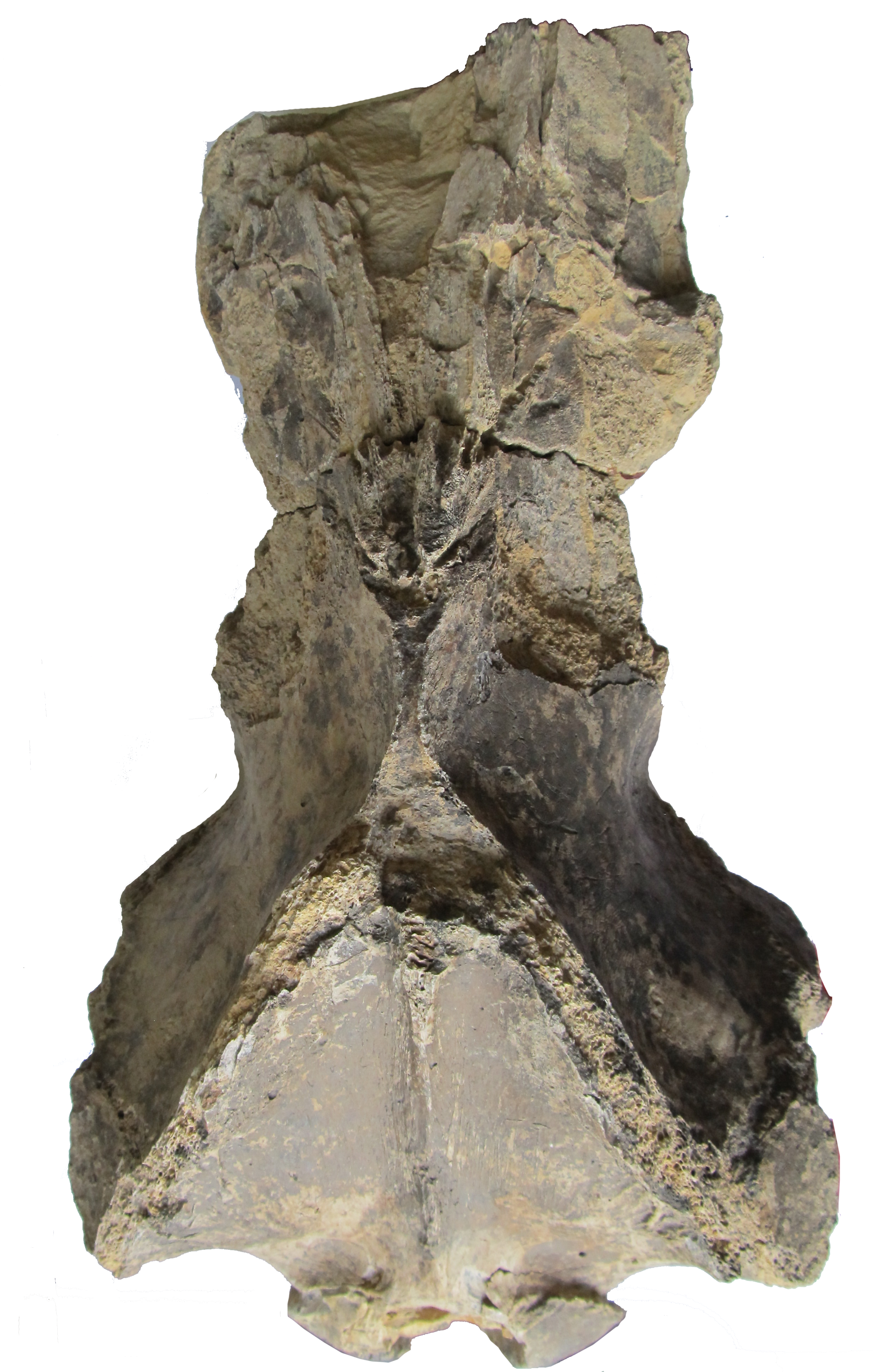
- Skull of Ciuciulea davidi Gol'din, 2018, dorsal side

Scientific classification
- Domain: Eukaryota
- Kingdom: Animalia
- Phylum: Chordata
- Class: Mammalia
- Order: Artiodactyla
- Infraorder: Cetacea
- Family: Cetotheriidae
- Genus: †Ciuciulea; Gol'din, 2018

Species
- †Ciuciulea davidi Gol'din, 2018 (type)

= Ciuciulea (whale) =

Ciuciulea davidi Temporal range: Miocene

Extinct genus of whales

Ciuciulea is a genus of cetotheriid mysticete found in middle Miocene marine deposits in Moldova.

== Description ==
Ciuciulea is a dwarf cetotheriid 3–4 meters in length. It comes from the Badenian deposits (13.8-12.7 Ma) of the Central Paratethys, and this is the earliest world record of the family Cetotheriidae. It differs from the other Cetotheriidae in the presence of a narrow occipital shield, which is as long as wide, and a pars cochlearis of the periotic bone bulging out ventral to fenestra rotunda. Primitive characters include the premaxillae forming a transverse line with the posterior ends of nasals and maxillae rather than constricted or overridden by ascending processes of maxillae.

== Biology ==
Ciuciulea lived in shallow marine waters in present-day Moldova, earlier than true seals Pontophoca, Sarmatonectes, Histriophoca, Monachopsis, Cryptophoca, and Praepusa, the putative kentriodontid Sarmatodelphis, and the problematic odontocetes Pachypleurus, Phocaena euxinica, and Delphinus bessarabicus.
