= Parasqualodon =

Scientific classification
- Domain: Eukaryota
- Kingdom: Animalia
- Phylum: Chordata
- Class: Mammalia
- Order: Artiodactyla
- Infraorder: Cetacea
- Family: †Squalodontidae
- Genus: †Parasqualodon; McCoy, 1867
- Species: †P. wilkinsoni

Binomial name
- †Parasqualodon wilkinsoni McCoy, 1867

Extinct genus of mammals

Parasqualodon is an extinct genus of toothed whale from the Oligocene. It contains a single species, Parasqualodon wilkinsoni. It has been suggested that the taxon constitutes a nomen dubium.
