= Nannocetus =

Nannocetus Temporal range: Miocene, 7.2–5.3 Ma

Scientific classification
- Domain: Eukaryota
- Kingdom: Animalia
- Phylum: Chordata
- Class: Mammalia
- Order: Artiodactyla
- Infraorder: Cetacea
- Family: Cetotheriidae
- Subfamily: †Herpetocetinae
- Genus: †Nannocetus; Kellogg, 1929

Species
- †N. eremus Kellogg, 1929 (type)

Extinct genus of mammals

Nannocetus is an extinct baleen whale belonging to the family Cetotheriidae.

== Description ==
Nannocetus is a diminutive mysticete measuring 13 feet (4.0 meters) long. It is characterized by the ventral orientation (in posterior view) of the postglenoid process; postglenoid process twisted medially (in ventral view) relative to the anteroposterior axis of the skull; equal projection of the ventral and dorsal lobes of the tympanic than the dorsal lobe; deeper notch separating the two lobes of the tympanic; reniform morphology of the tympanic in ventral view; lip of the tympanic slightly inflated; sub-rectilinear medial edge of the involucrum with a step in its anterior third; anterior process of the petrosal sub-triangular; thin crista transversa of the petrosal; and pars cochlearis hemispherical.

== Taxonomy and classification ==
The holotype is UCMP 26502 was collected from the Late Miocene (Messinian) Towsley Formation of Humphreys, Los Angeles County, California. It has been traditionally assigned to Cetotheriidae since its description, a classification that still stands and has been supported by recent cladistic analyses of 'cetothere' relationships.
