= Plesiocetus =

Plesiocetus Temporal range: Mid Miocene-Pleistocene ~7–1.806 Ma

Scientific classification
- Domain: Eukaryota
- Kingdom: Animalia
- Phylum: Chordata
- Class: Mammalia
- Order: Artiodactyla
- Infraorder: Cetacea
- Family: Balaenopteridae
- Genus: †Plesiocetus; Van Beneden 1859

Species
- P. garopii Van Beneden 1859 (type); P. brialmontii; "P." dyticus; P. gervaisii; "P." occidentalis

Synonyms
- Balaenoptera musculoides van Beneden, 1880

Extinct genus of mammals

Plesiocetus is a genus of extinct rorquals found worldwide. It has had a chequered taxonomic history, having served as a wastebasket genus for a handful of mysticete species.

== Taxonomy ==
The genus Plesiocetus was originally coined for three mysticete species from Neogene marine deposits in the vicinity of Antwerp, Belgium: P. garopii, P. hupschii, and P. burtinii.

The three originally included species of Plesiocetus went about their separate ways. P. garopii was designated the type species of the genus, while the other two were referred to Cetotherium.(P. hupschii and P. burtinii were later assigned to Plesiocetopsis, which was originally erected as a subgenus of Cetotherium) Later, van Beneden noted the similarities of Plesiocetus with the fin whale, so he renamed Plesiocetus garopii into Balaenoptera musculoides, which is invalid under current ICZN rules. At the same time, he also erected the new species P. brialmontii on the basis of fragmentary remains, while referring Cetotherium dubius to Plesiocetus.

The taxonomy of Plesiocetus by now was confused. Plesiocetus garopii was referred to Balaenoptera (making Plesiocetus a synonym of Balaenoptera), while P. hupschii and P. burtinii were assigned to Cetotherium. To avoid nomenclatorial complications, Plesiocetus hupschii was designated the type species of Plesiocetopsis, removing any synonymy between Plesiocetus and Plesiocetopsis. Recent studies, however, indicate that Plesiocetus shares no characters with Balaenoptera to the exclusion of other balaenopterids. For its part, P. burtinii was referred to Aglaocetus, while P. brialmontii was declared a nomen dubium. These revisions left P. garopii the type and only species of Plesiocetus.

In 2021, a thorough review of Plesiocetus by Bisconti and Bosselaers led its authors to the conclusion that "Plesiocetus is a nomen dubium and must be abandoned by mysticete taxonomists".

== Distribution ==
Fossils of Plesiocetus have been found in:

Neogene

- Gaimán Formation, Argentina
- Berchem, Diest and Sables d'Anvers Formations, Belgium
- Navidad Formation, Chile
- Mont-de-Marsan and Poussan, France
- Eibergen Member, Netherlands

Quaternary

- Red Crag Formation, United Kingdom
