= Kurdalagonus =

Kurdalagonus Temporal range: Miocene

Scientific classification
- Domain: Eukaryota
- Kingdom: Animalia
- Phylum: Chordata
- Class: Mammalia
- Order: Artiodactyla
- Infraorder: Cetacea
- Family: Cetotheriidae
- Subfamily: †Cetotheriinae
- Genus: †Kurdalagonus; Tarasenko and Lopatin, 2012

Species
- †K. mchedlidzei Tarasenko & Lopatin, 2012 (type)

Extinct genus of whales

Kurdalagonus is a genus of cetotheriid mysticete in the subfamily Cetotheriinae from the Miocene of the Russian Caucasus.

"Kurdalagonus" adygeicus has been reassigned to Mithridatocetus, while the referral of "Cetotherium" maicopicum to Kurdalagonus has been questioned.
