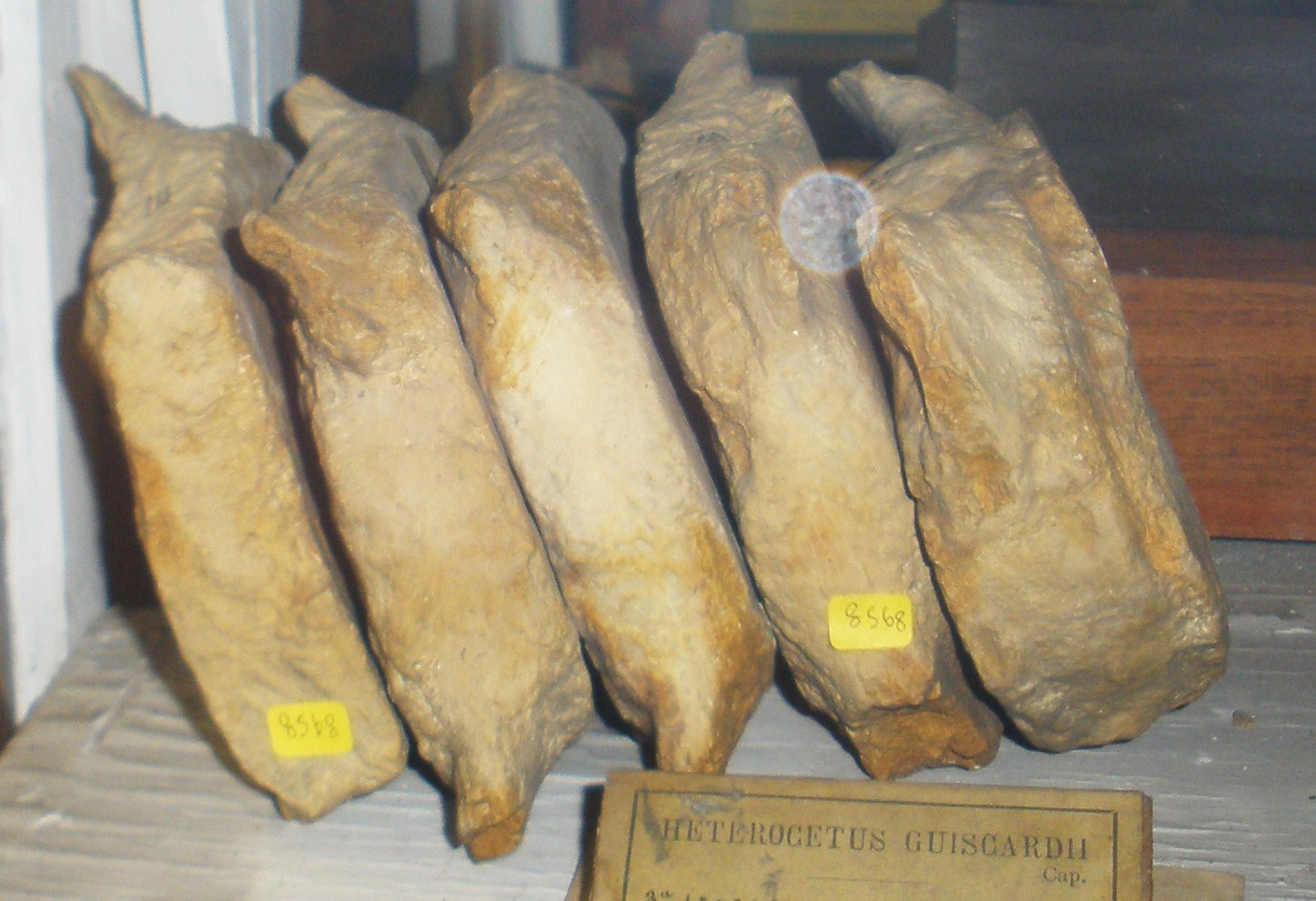
- Heterocetus guiscardii vertebrae

Scientific classification
- Domain: Eukaryota
- Kingdom: Animalia
- Phylum: Chordata
- Class: Mammalia
- Order: Artiodactyla
- Infraorder: Cetacea
- Family: Cetotheriidae
- Genus: †Heterocetus; Capellini, 1877

= Heterocetus =

Extinct genus of mammals

Heterocetus is a dubious genus of extinct cetacean.

== Species ==
- Heterocetus brevifrons (van Beneden, 1872)
- Heterocetus guiscardii Capellini, 1877
- Heterocetus major Stefano, 1900
- Heterocetus sprangii van Beneden, 1886

=== Misassigned species ===
- Heterocetus affinis Van Beneden, 1880; now assigned to Parietobalaena as P. affinis
