= Acrodelphis =

Acrodelphis Temporal range: 20-16 Ma (Burdigalian)

Scientific classification
- Kingdom: Animalia
- Phylum: Chordata
- Class: Mammalia
- Order: Artiodactyla
- Infraorder: Cetacea
- Family: †Acrodelphinidae
- Genus: †Acrodelphis; Abel, 1900

Type species
- †Acrodelphis letochae Brandt, 1873

Extinct genus of toothed whale from the Miocene

Acrodelphis is a genus of extinct toothed whale from the Early Miocene (Burdigalian) of Austria. The type and only species is A. letochae.

== Taxonomy ==
The genus Acrodelphis was erected by Othenio Abel for a variety of long-snouted odontocetes, including the type species of Champsodelphis. However, no type species was designated for Acrodelphis. Abel (1905) removed Champsodelphis macrogenius from Acrodelphis and Trouessart (1906) designated Champsodelphis letochae as the type species of Acrodelphis.
