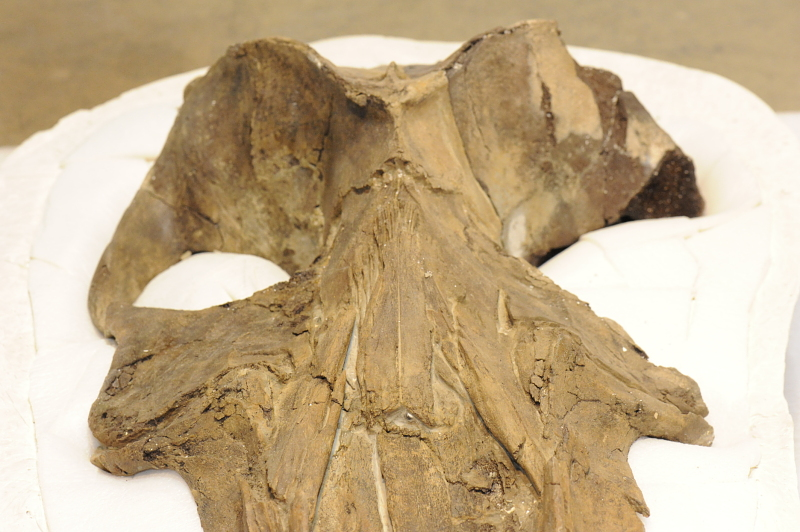

Scientific classification
- Domain: Eukaryota
- Kingdom: Animalia
- Phylum: Chordata
- Class: Mammalia
- Order: Artiodactyla
- Infraorder: Cetacea
- Family: Cetotheriidae
- Genus: †Cephalotropis; Cope, 1896

Species
- †C. coronatus Cope, 1896 (type)

= Cephalotropis =

Cephalotropis Temporal range: Miocene, 10–9 Ma

Extinct genus of mammals

Cephalotropis is a genus of baleen whale belonging to the extinct family Cetotheriidae. Its type species is Cephalotropis coronatus.

== Description ==
Cephalotropis is diagnosed by the following features: a long sagittal crest, a more anteriorly produced angle of the supraoccipital angle, among other features. There is insufficient information to determine how big Cephalotropis was, but it probably grew to about 16–20 feet long.

== Taxonomy ==
Cephalotropis coronatus was originally described from the Late Miocene (Tortonian) St. Mary's Formation of St. Mary's Formation, Maryland, based on the holotype USNM 9352. A second species of the genus, C. nectus, was named for a specimen from a Tortonian-aged formation in Portugal, but is now considered a junior synonym of C. coronatus.
