= Herentalia =

Herentalia Temporal range: late Miocene

Scientific classification
- Kingdom: Animalia
- Phylum: Chordata
- Class: Mammalia
- Infraclass: Placentalia
- Order: Artiodactyla
- Infraorder: Cetacea
- Family: Cetotheriidae
- Genus: †Herentalia; Bisconti, 2015

Species
- †H. nigra Bisconti, 2015 (type)

Extinct genus of mammals

Herentalia is a genus of cetotheriid mysticete in the subfamily Herpetocetinae. Remains have been found in Late Miocene marine deposits in Belgium.

== Description ==
Herentalia is distinguished from other cetotheriids in being larger and more robust, and in having ascending processes of the maxilla with rounded posterior ends. The species name nigra means "black" and refers to the color of the fossilized bone of the holotype.
