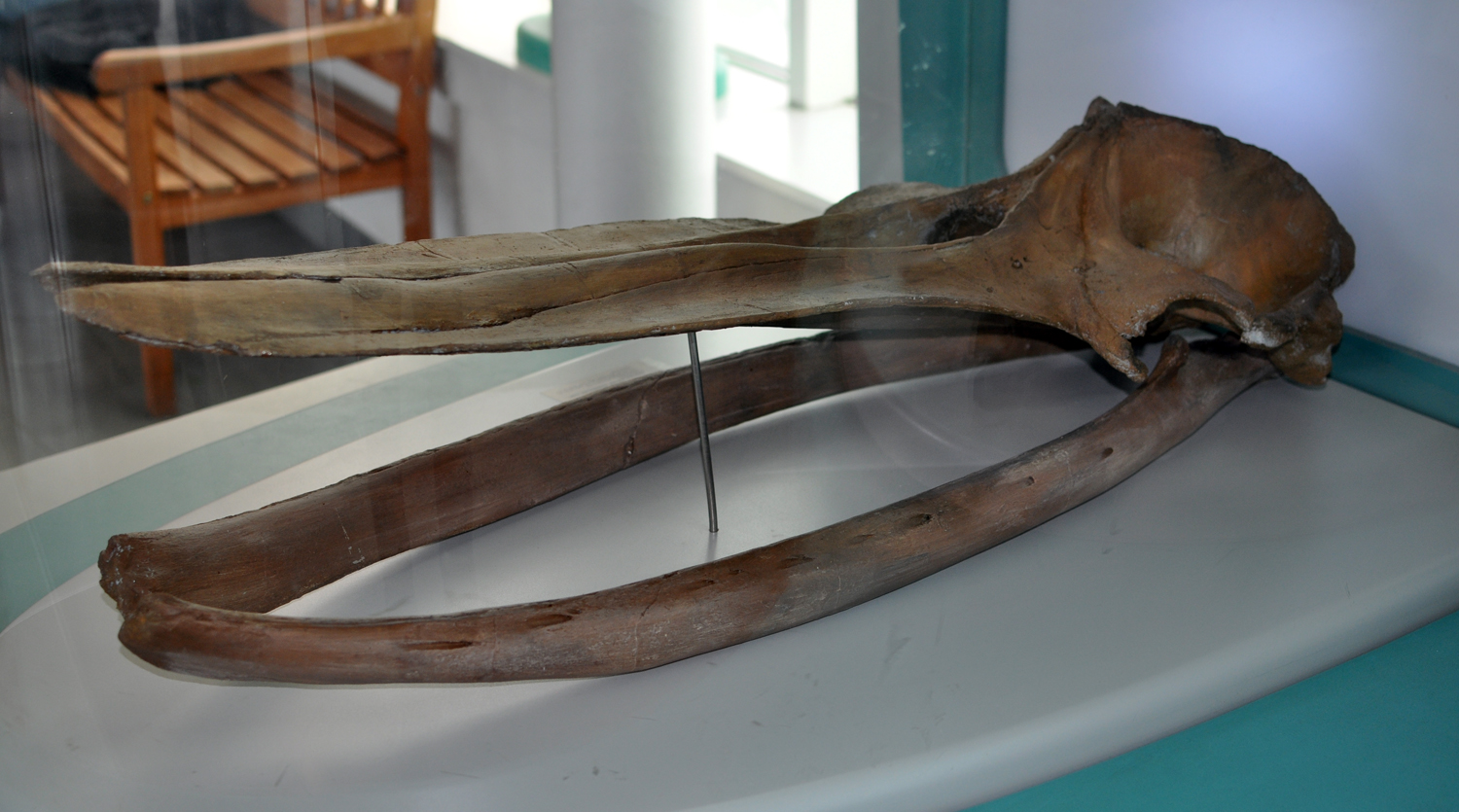
- Piscobalaena nana skull

Scientific classification
- Kingdom: Animalia
- Phylum: Chordata
- Class: Mammalia
- Infraclass: Placentalia
- Order: Artiodactyla
- Infraorder: Cetacea
- Family: Cetotheriidae; G. Pilleri and H. J. Siber, 1989
- Genus: †Piscobalaena; G. Pilleri and H. J. Siber, 1989

Type species
- †Piscobalaena nana G. Pilleri and H. J. Siber, 1989

= Piscobalaena =

Piscobalaena Temporal range: Mid-Late Miocene (Mayoan-Huayquerian & Clarendonian) ~11.608–5.332 Ma

Extinct genus of mammals

Piscobalaena is an extinct genus of cetaceans, which lived from the Middle to Late Miocene epochs (about 11.6 to 5.3 million years ago) in Peru and Florida. Its fossils have been found in the Pisco Formation of Peru and the Bone Valley Formation of Florida. At least some individuals of this diminutive whale were preyed on by the shark O. megalodon.

== Description ==
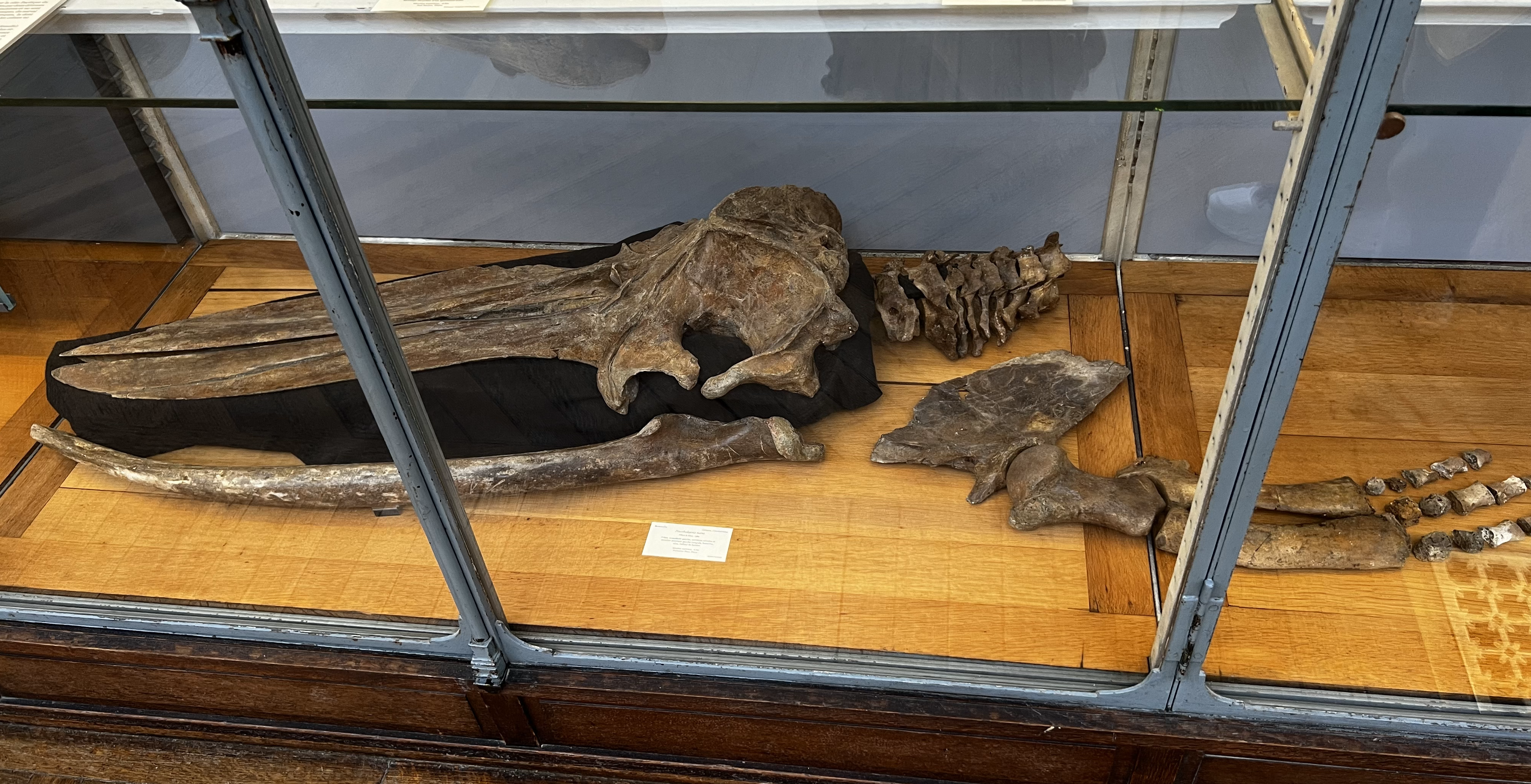
Partial skeleton at the National Museum of Natural History, France

This animal looked much like whales today, particularly small whales. The length was probably less than 5 metres (16 ft), and the skull of an adult was about one meter. Piscobalaena is known for some well-preserved specimens, including three young individuals and an adult. Some characteristics of the skull distinguish Piscobalaena from modern whales (such as the shape of the supraorbital process).

== Classification ==
Described for the first time in 1989 by Pilleri and Siber, Piscobalaena is known from fossils found in the Pisco Formation in Peru. Piscobalaena is considered a representative of Cetotheriidae a group of baleen whales with primitive characteristics similar to that of Balaenoptera, fossil species of which have been found mainly in the northern hemisphere. The closest relative of Piscobalaena appears to have been Herpetocetus, from the Mio-Pliocene of the northern hemisphere.

== Palaeogeography ==
Other fragmentary remains attributed to Piscobalaena are also from Peru, but date a little older (late Miocene, about 10 million years ago). So it seems that this kind of whales were located in the Pacific coast of South America and evolved for at least five million years. Other fossils attributed with some doubt to Piscobalaena come from the Miocene Bone Valley Formation of Florida: If so, then Piscobalaena might have had a wider distribution than the Peruvian coast. This could have been because the Isthmus of Panama was open until at least Late Pliocene, allowing the passage of marine species from the Atlantic to the Pacific and vice versa. Other marine mammals found in the Pisco Formation include the odd dolphin Odobenocetops, the long-necked seal Acrophoca, and aquatic sloth Thalassocnus.
