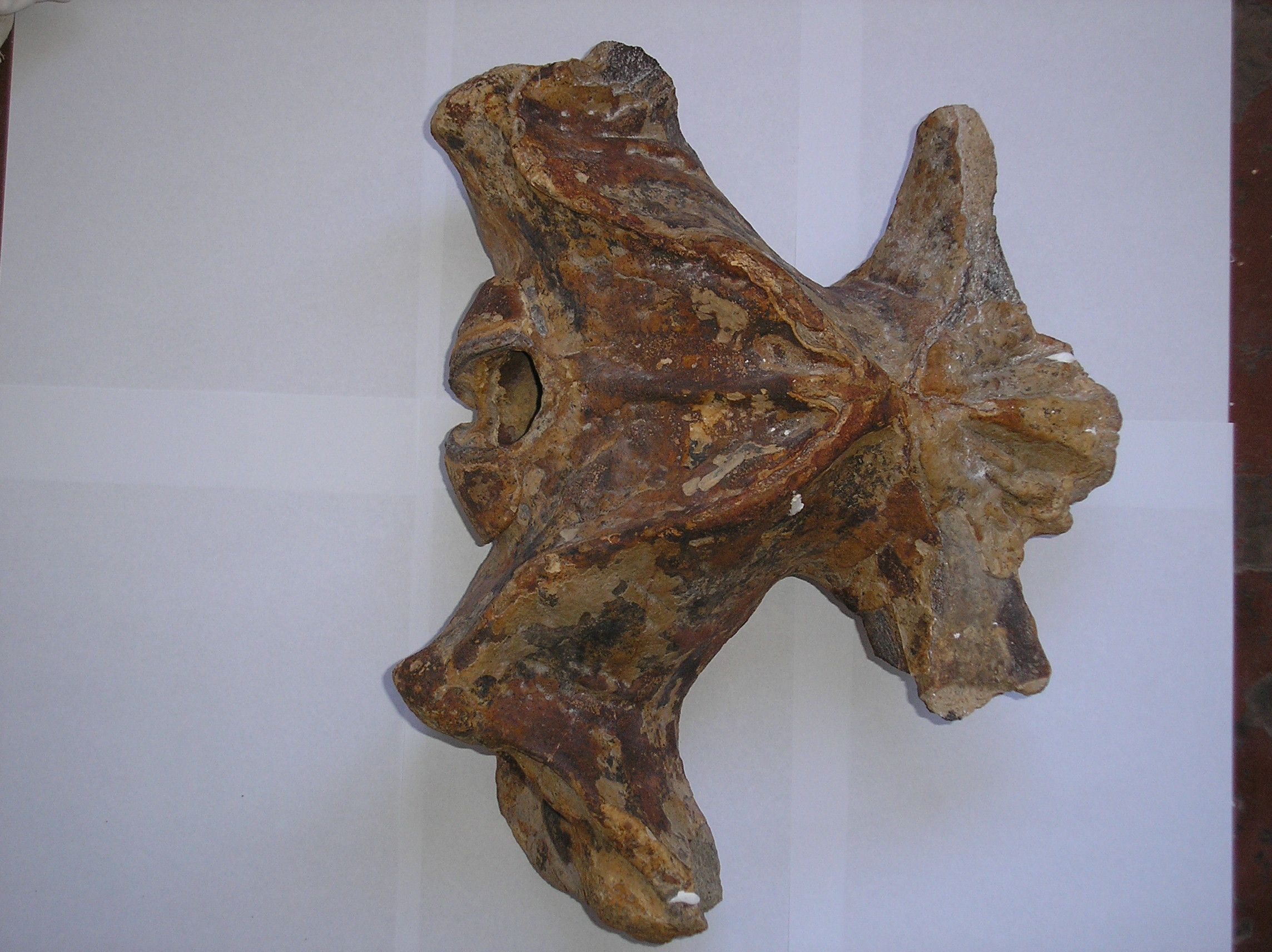
- Brandtocetus chongulek, the holotype skull

Scientific classification
- Domain: Eukaryota
- Kingdom: Animalia
- Phylum: Chordata
- Class: Mammalia
- Order: Artiodactyla
- Suborder: Whippomorpha
- Infraorder: Cetacea
- Family: Cetotheriidae
- Genus: †Brandtocetus; Gol’din & Startsev 2014
- Species: †B. chongulek

Binomial name
- †Brandtocetus chongulek Gol'din & Startsev 2014

= Brandtocetus =

Brandtocetus Temporal range: Miocene

Extinct genus of whales

Brandtocetus is a genus of cetotheriid mysticete in the subfamily Cetotheriinae. The type and only species is Brandtocetus chongulek from the late Miocene (Tortonian) of the Kerch Peninsula in Crimea.

Brandtocetus chongulek was a whale approximately 4–5 m long differing from all Cetotheriidae by having a transversely expanded lateral portion of the squamosal bone; a rhomboid temporal fossa; an occipital shield extending anterior to the center of the temporal fossa; and an elongated posterior process of the tympanoperiotic with a proximodistally extended, and distally expanded, distal portion exposed as an oval surface on the posterolateral skull wall.
