= Eucetotherium =

Eucetotherium Temporal range: Miocene

Scientific classification
- Domain: Eukaryota
- Kingdom: Animalia
- Phylum: Chordata
- Class: Mammalia
- Order: Artiodactyla
- Suborder: Whippomorpha
- Infraorder: Cetacea
- Family: Cetotheriidae
- Genus: †Eucetotherium; Brandt, 1873

Species
- †E. helmersonii (Brandt, 1871) (type)

Extinct genus of mammals

Eucetotherium is a genus of cetotheriid mysticete from Miocene (Tortonian) marine deposits in the Russian Caucasus.
