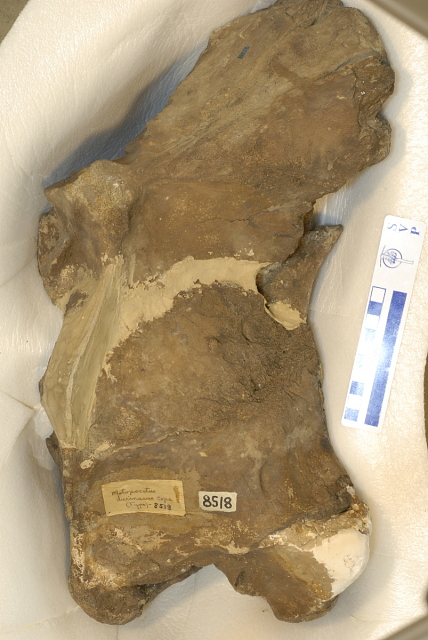
- Atlas vertebra of the M. dinasus holotype

Scientific classification
- Kingdom: Animalia
- Phylum: Chordata
- Class: Mammalia
- Infraclass: Placentalia
- Order: Artiodactyla
- Infraorder: Cetacea
- Family: Cetotheriidae
- Subfamily: †Herpetocetinae
- Genus: †Metopocetus; Cope, 1896

Species
- †M. durinasus Cope, 1896 (type) †M. hunteri Marx, Bosselaers and Louwye, 2016

= Metopocetus =

Metopocetus Temporal range: Miocene, 13.8–16 Ma

Extinct genus of mammals

Metopocetus is an extinct genus of baleen whale belonging to the family Cetotheriidae. The type species is Metopocetus durinasus.

== Description ==
Metopocetus is diagnosable by lateral occipital crests continuous with temporal crests that diverge forward, as well as elongate frontals, and short nasal bones that project posterior to frontals.

== Location ==
Metopocetus durinasus is known only from the middle Miocene (Langhian) Calvert Beach Member of the Calvert Formation of Westmoreland County, Virginia. Its type specimen is USNM 8518. On the other hand, Metopocetus hunteri is based on a partial cranium from the Breda Formation of the Netherlands.
