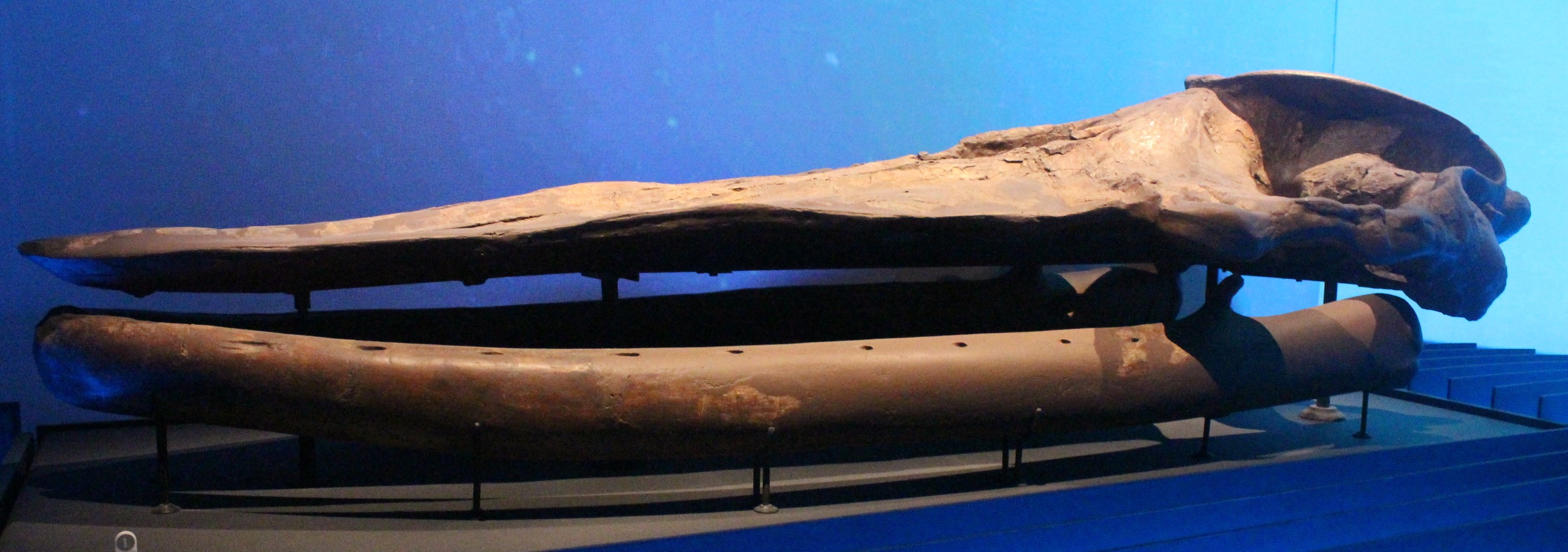
- Holotype skull, Natural History Museum of Los Angeles County

Scientific classification
- Domain: Eukaryota
- Kingdom: Animalia
- Phylum: Chordata
- Class: Mammalia
- Order: Artiodactyla
- Infraorder: Cetacea
- Superfamily: Balaenopteroidea
- Family: †Tranatocetidae
- Genus: †Mixocetus; Kellogg, 1934

Species
- †M. elysius Kellogg, 1934 (type)

= Mixocetus =

Mixocetus Temporal range: Late Miocene, 11.6–10 Ma

Extinct genus of mammals

Mixocetus is a genus of extinct baleen whale belonging to the family Tranatocetidae. It is known only from the late Miocene (Tortonian) of Los Angeles County, California.

== Description ==
Mixocetus is a large-size mysticete with a long, narrow rostrum, a robust braincase, a nostril opening extending posteriorly just a few inches behind the antorbital processes, the posterior ends of the premaxillae, maxillae, and nasals tapering and extending posteriorly to a point between superior parts of supraorbital processes of the frontals, and a temporal fossa opening dorsally. Unlike Cetotherium, the antorbital process is larger, the lateral margins of the supraoccipital processes of the frontals are parallel to each other, there is a protruding lateral wall of the braincase, and the rear portion of the cranium has a very thick and posteriorly protruding exoccipital.

== Taxonomy ==
The holotype of this species is LACM 882. It was collected from the Modelo Formation (early Tortonian, 10-11.6 Ma) of Lincoln Heights in Los Angeles County, California. It now resides as a permanent exhibit at the Natural History Museum of Los Angeles County in Exposition Park, Los Angeles.
