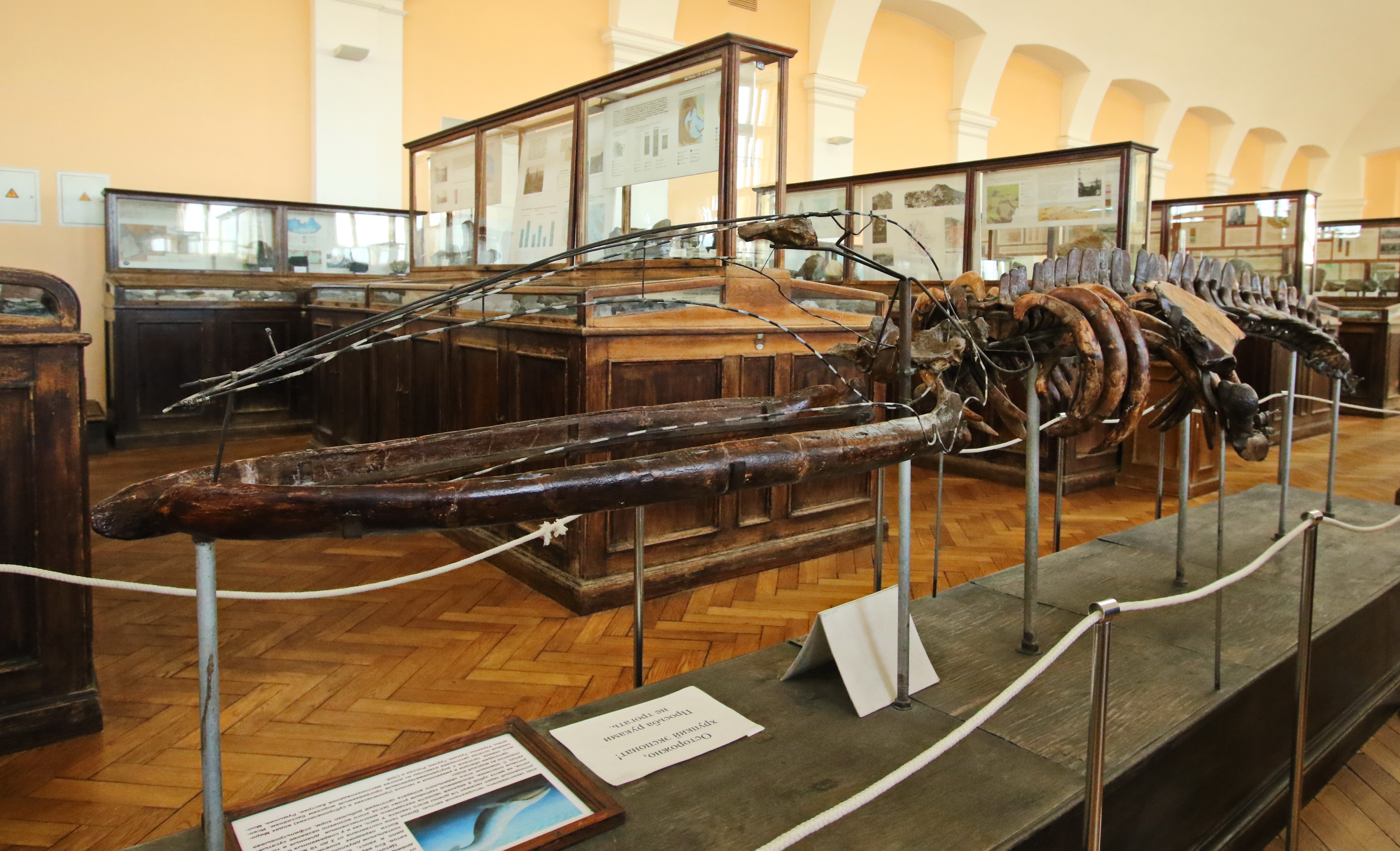
- M. mayeri fossil in A.P. Karpinsky Russian Geological Research Institute

Scientific classification
- Domain: Eukaryota
- Kingdom: Animalia
- Phylum: Chordata
- Class: Mammalia
- Order: Artiodactyla
- Infraorder: Cetacea
- Family: Cetotheriidae
- Subfamily: †Cetotheriinae
- Genus: †Mithridatocetus; Gol'din & Startsev, 2016

Species
- †M. adygeicus (Tarasenko & Lopatin, 2012) †M. eichwaldi Gol'din & Startsev, 2016 (type) †M. mayeri (Brandt, 1871) (nomen dubium)

= Mithridatocetus =

Mithridatocetus Temporal range: Miocene

Extinct genus of whales

Mithridatocetus is a genus of cetotheriid mysticete in the subfamily Cetotheriinae. Known specimens have been found in marine deposits in Crimea, Ukraine, and the Russian Caucasus.
