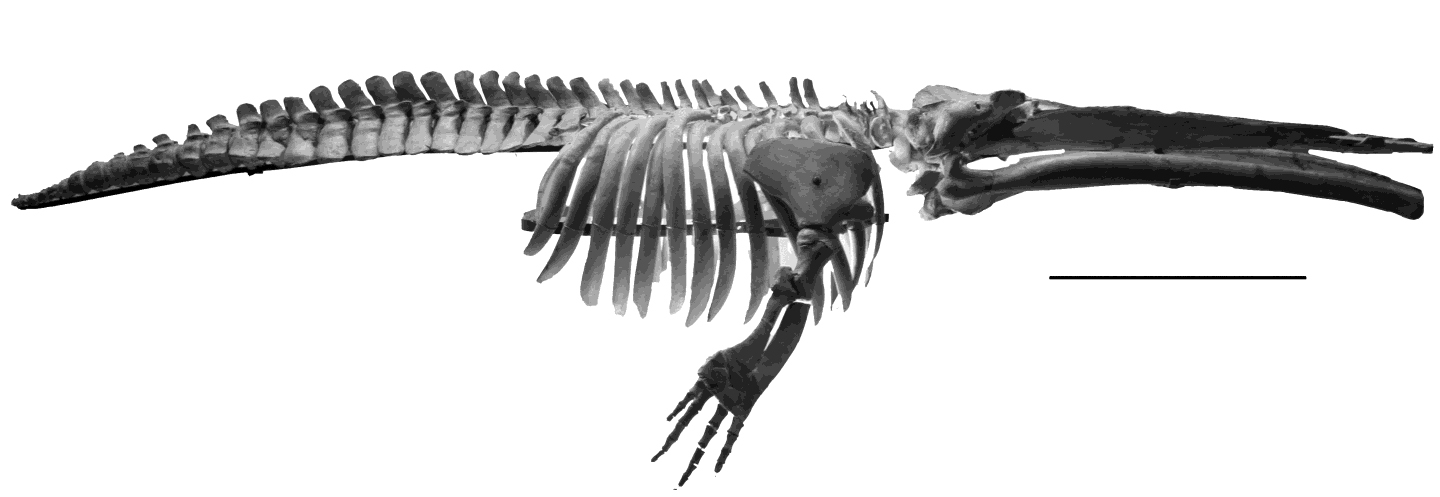
- Mounted skeleton of Cetotherium riabinini

Scientific classification
- Kingdom: Animalia
- Phylum: Chordata
- Class: Mammalia
- Infraclass: Placentalia
- Order: Artiodactyla
- Infraorder: Cetacea
- Family: Cetotheriidae
- Subfamily: †Cetotheriinae; Whitmore & Barnes, 2008
- Genus: †Cetotherium; Brandt 1843

Type species
- †C. rathkii Brandt 1843

Species
- †C. crassangulum Cope, 1895; †C. furlongi Kellogg, 1925; †C. rathkii Brandt, 1843; †C. riabinini Hofstein, 1948

= Cetotherium =

Cetotherium Temporal range: Miocene–Pliocene

Extinct genus of mammals

Cetotherium ("whale beast") is an extinct genus of baleen whales from the family Cetotheriidae. It was a relatively small whale with an estimated total length of 3–4 metres (9.8–13.1 ft).

== Taxonomy ==
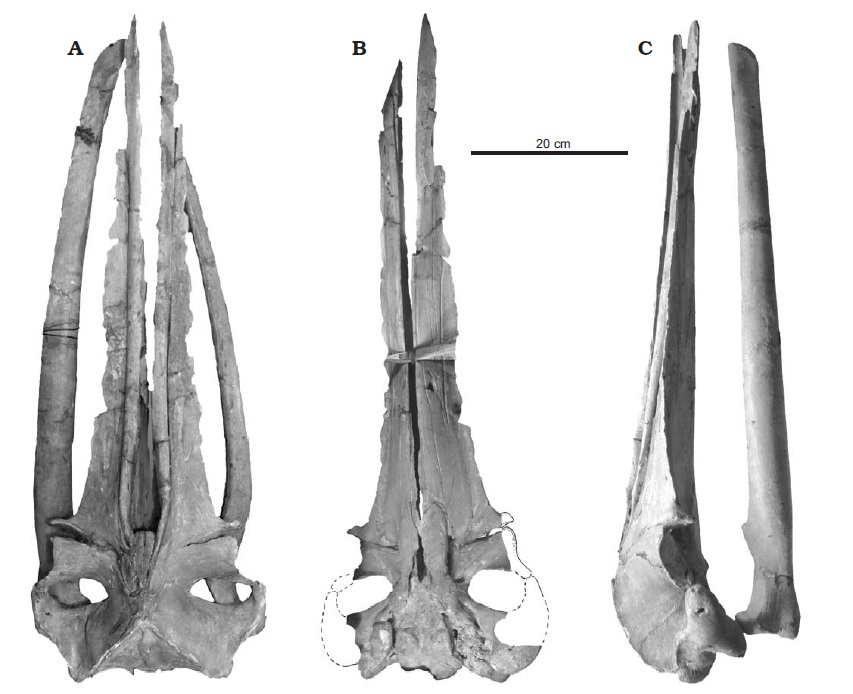
C. riabinini skull

The family Cetotheriidae and the genus Cetotherium (sensu lato) have been used as wastebaskets for all kinds of baleen whales, most notably by Brandt 1873, Spassky (1954) and Mčedlidze 1970. Based on more recent phylogenetic studies and revisions of many 19th century genera, much smaller monophyletic Cetotheriidae and Cetotherium sensu stricto is limited to a single or only a few species. For example, Gol'din, Startsev & Krakhmalnaya 2013 included only C. rathkii and C. riabinini in the genus and only ten genera in the family.

Cetotheriidae were thought to have gone extinct during the Pliocene until 2012, when it was hypothesized that the pygmy right whale was the sole surviving species of this family.

=== Formerly assigned to Cetotherium ===
The following species were originally described as nominal species of Cetotherium but have been either reassigned to other genera or removed from Cetotherium:

- Cetotherium furlongi Kellogg, 1925, is known from a partial skull from the Burdigalian of the Vaqueros Formation in California, but the holotype is lost.
- Cetotherium gastaldii Strobel, 1875, known from the early Pliocene-age Sabbie d'Asti Formation of the Piedmont region in Italy, is now the type species of the eschrichtiid genus Eschrichtioides.
- Cetotherium klinderi Brandt, 1871, is known from an isolated earbone from Miocene sediments in Chişinău, Moldova. Although fragmentary, it is not congeneric with the two species of Cetotherium.
- Cetotherium maicopicum Spasski, 1951, based on a specimen from the late Miocene of the Russian Caucasus, was reassigned to the genus Kurdalagonus from the same region in 2012, although Gol'din and Startsev (2016) have questioned this referral.
- Cetotherium mayeri Brandt, 1871, known from a partial skeleton, has been reassigned to Mithridatocetus.

Cetotherium incertum Brandt, 1873, known from a vertebra, and "Ziphius" priscus Eichwald, 1840 are nomina dubia, while Cetotherium pusillum Nordmann, 1860 requires re-assessment.

== Evolution ==
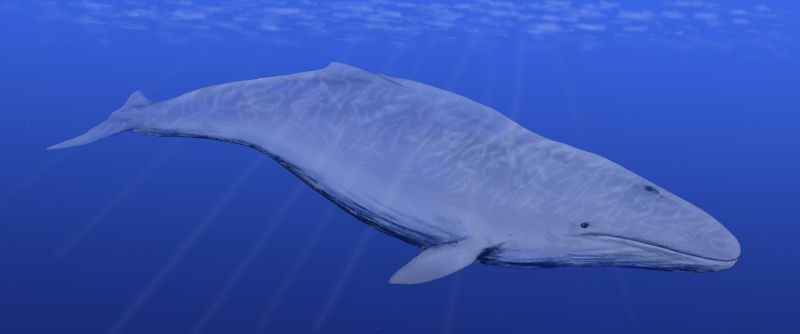
Restoration of C. furlongi

Cetotheres came into existence during the Oligocene epoch. The cetotheres have been divided into two sub-groups. One group includes Cetotherium. From an evolutionary perspective, these whales share some characteristics of the Balaenopteridae and Eschrichtiidae.

== Paleobiology ==
Fossil records have revealed a predator-prey relationship between large sharks (e.g. O. megalodon) and Cetotheriids. The raptorial toothed whale, Livyatan melvillei, may too have posed a threat to these whales.

== See also ==
- Evolution of cetaceans
