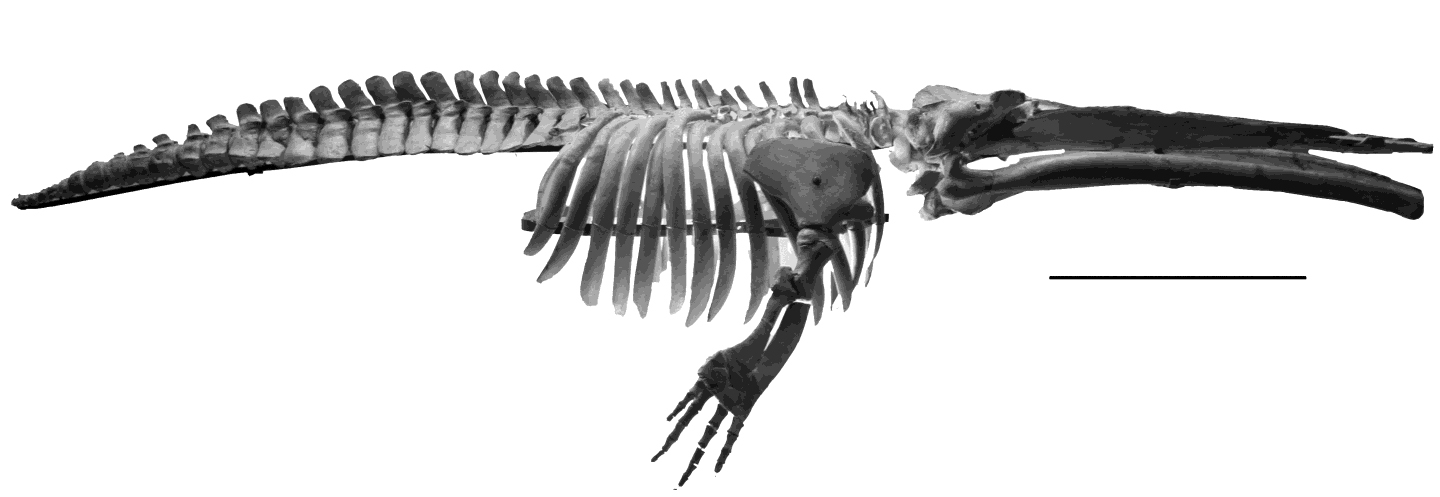
- Cetotherium riabinini

Scientific classification
- Kingdom: Animalia
- Phylum: Chordata
- Class: Mammalia
- Order: Artiodactyla
- Infraorder: Cetacea
- Parvorder: Mysticeti
- Family: Cetotheriidae; Brandt 1872

Subfamilies and genera
- See text

Synonyms
- Neobalaenidae? Miller, 1923

= Cetotheriidae =

Cetotheriidae Temporal range: Chattian–Recent

Family of mammals

Cetotheriidae is a family of baleen whales (parvorder Mysticeti). The family is known to have existed from the Late Oligocene to the Early Pleistocene before going extinct. Although some phylogenetic studies conducted by Fordyce & Marx 2013 recovered the living pygmy right whale as a member of Cetotheriidae, making the pygmy right whale the only living cetotheriid, other authors either dispute this placement or recover Neobalaenidae as a sister group to Cetotheriidae.

== Taxonomy ==
After its description by Brant in 1872, Cetotheriidae was used as a wastebasket taxon for baleen whales which were not assignable to extant whale families.

Comparing the cranial and mandibular morphology of 23 taxa (including late archaeocetes and both fossil and extant mysticetes), Bouetel & Muizon 2006 found Cetotheriidae in this traditional sense to be polyphyletic. Based on ten cranial characters, they also concluded that of the twelve included fossil baleen-bearing mysticetes, six formed a monophyletic group, Cetotheriidae sensu stricto.

Several phylogenetic studies since Bouetel & Muizon 2006 support the monophyly of a small group of core Cetotheriidae sensu stricto, archaic mysticetes with a cranium that have "a long ascending process of the maxilla with anteriorly diverging lateral border that interdigitates with the frontal" and some other characters. This group is limited to Cetotherium rathkii, Metopocetus durinasus, Mixocetus elysius, Herpetocetus scaldiensis, H. transatlanticus, H. bramblei, Nannocetus eremus, and Piscobalaena nana. The remaining genera placed in the family are considered Cetotheriidae sensu lato and are often referred to as the 'cetotheres'.

Bisconti, Lambert & Bosselaers 2013 considered the primitive 'cetothere' Joumocetus the most basal named taxon of their new superfamily Thalassotherii (Cetotheriidae s.l., Cetotheriidae s.s., Eschrichtiidae (gray whales) and Balaenopteridae (rorquals)) and suggested that the term "Cetotheriidae s.l." should be renamed "basal" or "stem thalassotherians". Fordyce & Marx 2013 found that the pygmy right whale formed a well-supported clade with Eschrichtiidae and Balaenopteridae based on molecular data, and that, within 'cetotheres', it was most closely related to the herpetocetines (Herpetocetus and Nannocetus) Bisconti et al. 2013, however, found, based on morphological data, it to be more closely related to Balaenidae (the bowhead and right whales), but added that additional specimens are expected to resolve these conflicting results within a few years.

Classification of Cetotheriidae according to El Adli et al. (2014) and the Fossilworks online database:

- †Cephalotropis Cope 1896
- †Joumocetus Kimura & Hasegawa 2010
- Subfamily: †Cetotheriinae Whitmore and Barnes, 2008
  - †Brandtocetus Gol'din and Startsev 2014
  - †Cetotherium Brandt 1843
  - †Ciuciulea Gol'din, 2018
  - †Eucetotherium Brandt 1873
  - †Kurdalagonus Tarasenko & Lopatin 2012a
  - †Mithridatocetus Gol'din and Startsev 2017
  - †Vampalus Tarasenko & Lopatin 2012b
  - †Zygiocetus Tarasenko 2014
- Subfamily Herpetocetinae Steeman, 2007
  - †Herentalia Bisconti 2015
  - †Herpetocetus Van Beneden 1872
  - †Metopocetus Cope 1896
  - †Nannocetus Kellogg 1929
  - †Piscobalaena Pilleri and Siber 1989
  - †Tranatocetus? Gol'din and Steeman 2015
  - †Miocaperea
  - ?Caperea (Gray, 1846)

Incertae sedis:

- †Hibacetus Otsuka and Ota 2008
