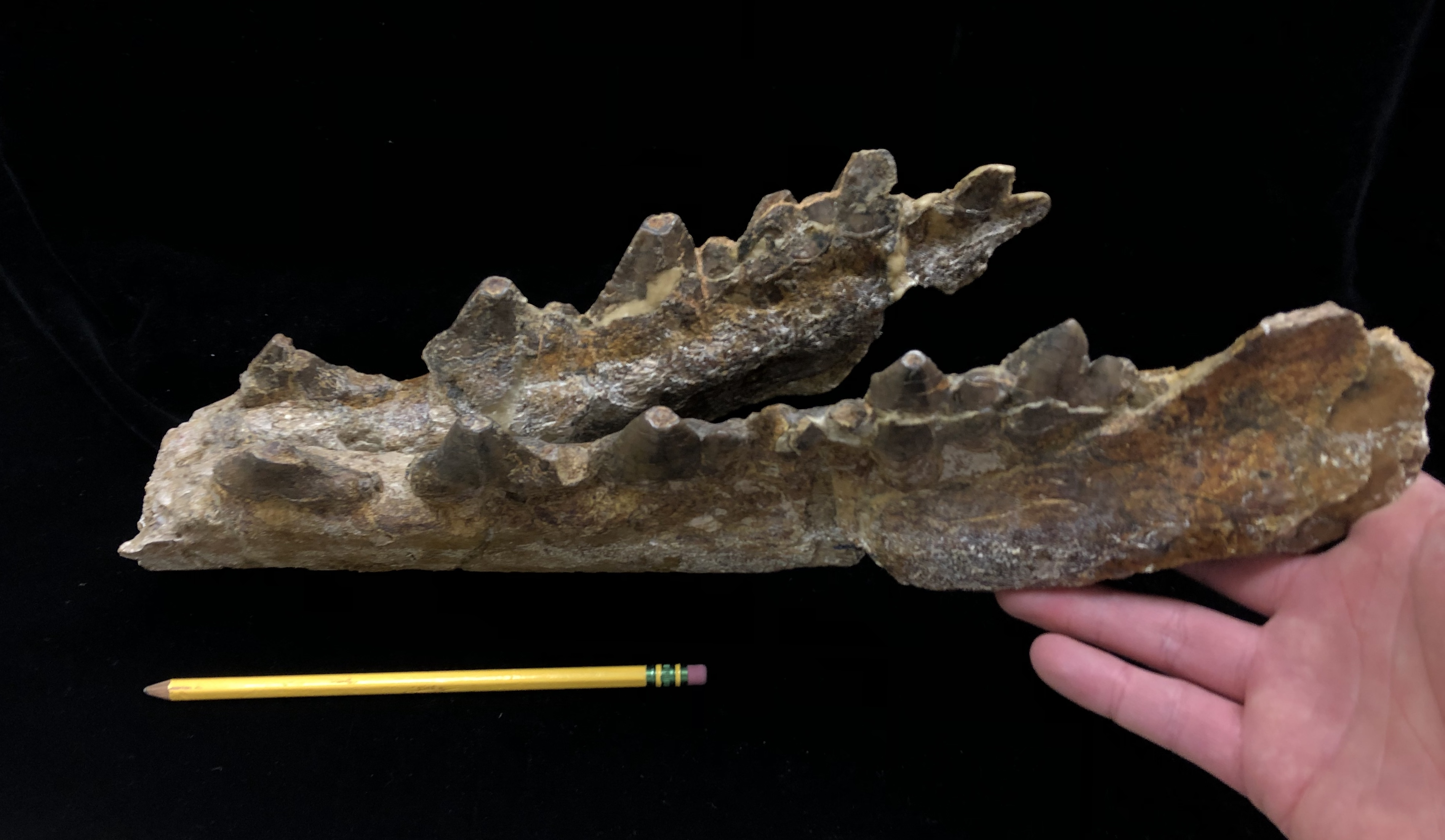
- Kharodacetus sahnii specimen IITR-SB 5029, a mandible

Scientific classification
- Kingdom: Animalia
- Phylum: Chordata
- Class: Mammalia
- Order: Artiodactyla
- Infraorder: Cetacea
- Family: †Protocetidae
- Genus: †Kharodacetus; Bajpai & Thewissen, 2014
- Species: †K. sahnii

Binomial name
- †Kharodacetus sahnii (Bajpai & Thewissen, 1998)

= Kharodacetus =

Kharodacetus Temporal range: Middle Eocene, 42 Ma

Genus of prehistoric mammal

Kharodacetus (lit. 'Kharoda whale') is an extinct genus of large-sized protocetid cetacean that lived during middle Eocene of Harudi Formation of Gujarat, western India. The genus contains a single species, Kharodacetus sahnii, which was originally described as a species of Gaviacetus, before redescribed as its own genus later on based on new material. It might acted as the apex predator of its respective environment based on its large size, relatively broad jaws and robust teeth.

== Discovery and Naming ==
Kharodacetus type locality in Gujarat, India.

The holotype of Kharodacetus, VPL 1021(which consists of a braincase, intertemporal region, orbits, palate, rostrum fragment and P2 teeth), was discovered in the Rato Nala locality, which is situated between Baranda and Harudi village, and is a part of Middle Eocene aged Harudi Formation. They originally considered it as a species of Gaviacetus, a protocetid otherwise only known from Eocene of Pakistan, on the basis of the rostrum fragment and described it as a new species, Gaviacetus sahnii, where the species name sahnii is after the Ashok Sahni, for his contribution in the Indian vertebrate paleontology.

Later, specimens like IITR-SB 3189(which consists of a rostrum, orbits, interorbital region and teeth) and IITR-SB 5029(which consists of a mandible with teeth) were discovered from the Kharoda locality and Rato Nala locality respectively and referred to the same taxon as VPL 1021, the specimen IITR-SB 3189 was used for identification, they found out that the rostrum shape was different from that of Gaviacetus, and later in 2014 erected a new genus, Kharodacetus, which resulted in a new combination, Kharodacetus sahnii, where the genus name combines Kharoda, after the Kharoda locality(where IITR-SB 3189 was discovered) and the Latin word cetus, which translates to whales.

== Description ==
=== Size ===
Kharodacetus was a large protocetid, with premolars and molars larger than those of other protocetid and archaeocetids from Indian subcontinent, and orbits of 5 cm in diameter, however no size estimates were calculated. The Babiacetus is considered closer in size to the Kharodacetus.

=== Skull ===
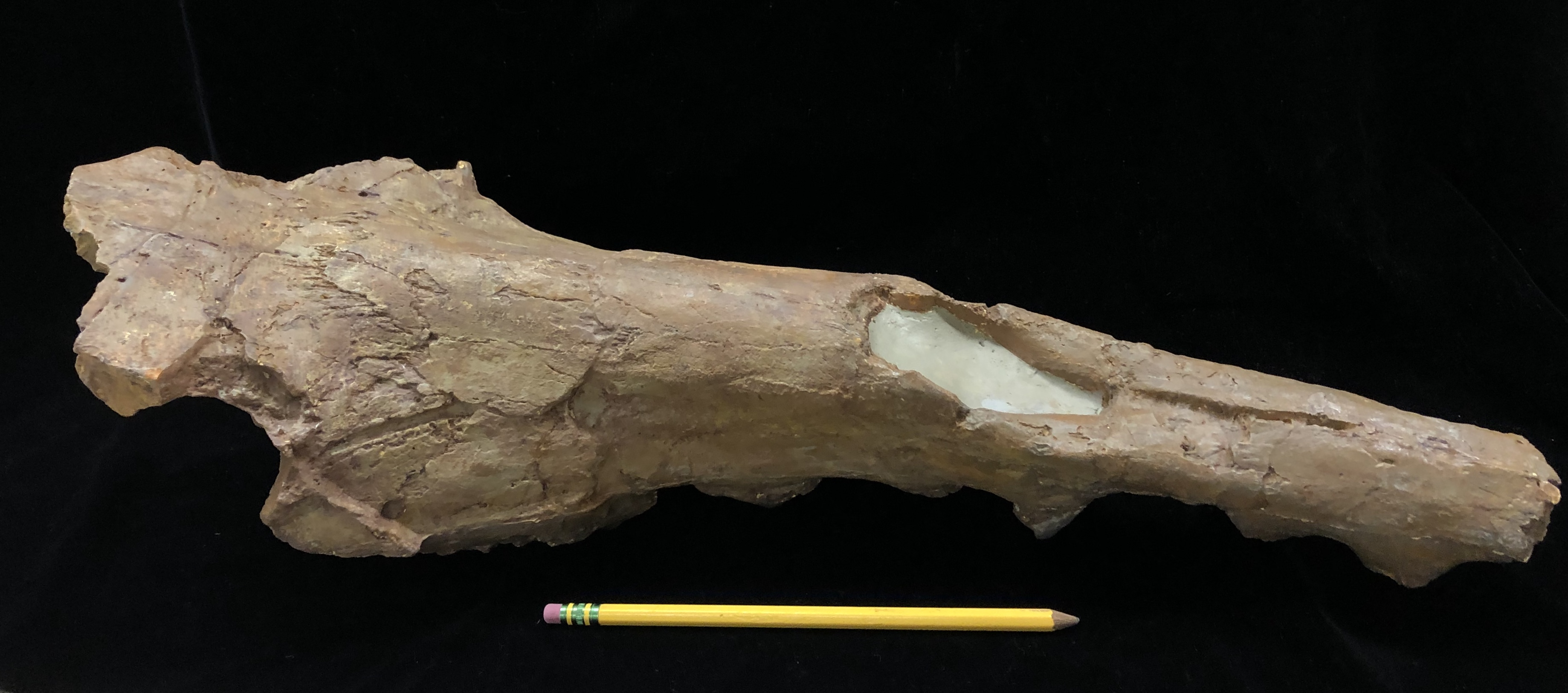
Kharodacetus sahnii, plaster replica of IITR-SB 3189.

The skull of Kharodacetus has a flat supraorbital shield in addition of large orbits, a feature that is universal among protocetids and used to separate them from pakicetids, ambulocetids and remingtonocetids. The snout is long and relatively broad, which separates Kharodacetus from narrow snouted Gaviacetus, Takracetus and Makaracetus. The orbits are located high above the palates, separating it from Indocetus. The nasal opening lies over P1 and is surrounded by the premaxilla and nasals, the maxilla contacts the frontal and the supraorbital foramen is located over P4, the lacrimal is rectangular, slightly longer then higher, left and right palates meet at median crest, the embrasure pits are present at P3, P4 and M1 with the M1 embrasure pit being the deepest, and palatine foramen are not present. As for the braincase, present in the holotype, the glenoid is rostrocaudally concave, the external auditory meatus indents the squamosal, and the mastoid process is projected more ventrally than the paroccipital or squamosal process.

== Classification ==
Kharodacetus is classified as a member of protocetid cetacean, though the phylogenetic relationship of Kharodacetus is not present in the original paper. Kharodacetus is also used to classify numerous other cetaceans, like a indeterminate cetacean from Bandah Formation which is distinguished by the presence of much large p4 tooth, Tupelocetus palmeri that is distinguished by posteriorly positioned accessory cusp on P2(though the P2 tooth is highly worn), and Phiomicetus anubis, one the basis of small premolar and molars.

A phylogenetic analysis by Kassegne and colleagues (2021) recovered Kharodacetus and Dhedacetus forming a clade with Protocetus, and a indeterminate Togolese form, their results are shown below:

- Pakicetidae
- - Ambulocetus
  - - - Attockicetus
      - - Dalanistes
        - - Remingtonocetus
          - - Kutchicetus
            - - Rayanistes
              - Andrewsiphius
    - - - Togocetus "earless"
        - KPO1
      - - - Rodhocetus
          - Maiacetus
        - - Qaisracetus
          - Peregocetus
          - - Tupelocetus
            - SNTB 2011-01
            - Carolinacetus
            - ?Carolinacetus sp.
          - Artiocetus
          - - Natchitochia
            - Gaviacetus
            - Aegyptocetus
            - - - Kharodacetus
                - - Dhedacetus
                  - - Morphotype γ
                    - Protocetus
              - - Georgiacetus
                - - Babiacetus
                  - Takracetus
                  - Aegicetus
                  - Morphotype β
                  - - Pelagiceti
                      Neoceti
                    - Basilosauridae

== Palaeobiology ==
=== Diet and Feeding ===
Being the largest protocetid currently known from Harudi Formation, the presence of robust jaws and teeth, Kharodacetus might have played a role of the apex predator in the region, going after prey like large fish, crocodilians and even other cetaceans, like remingtonocetids. The broad premolar cusps with worm crowns suggest a range of food processing abilities for Kharodacetus, different from other protocetids. The presence of a remingtonocetid sacrum near the fossils of Dhedacetus might have been an evidence for protocetid predation upon remingtonocetids.
