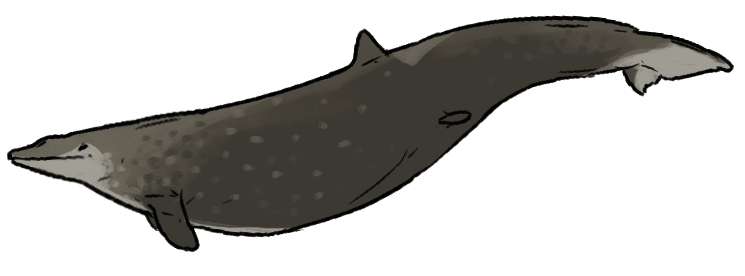
- Life reconstruction of Supayacetus.

Scientific classification
- Domain: Eukaryota
- Kingdom: Animalia
- Phylum: Chordata
- Class: Mammalia
- Order: Artiodactyla
- Suborder: Whippomorpha
- Infraorder: Cetacea
- Family: †Basilosauridae
- Genus: †Supayacetus; Uhen et al. 2011
- Species: †S. muizoni

Binomial name
- †Supayacetus muizoni Uhen et al. 2011

= Supayacetus =

Supayacetus Temporal range: Middle Eocene Bartonian

Species of mammal (fossil)

Supayacetus is an extinct genus of basilosaurid cetacean from the Middle Eocene (Bartonian stage) Paracas Formation of Peru. It has been noted for its relatively small size and basal morphology, with the sternum bearing close resemblance to those of protocetids. Due to this, it has been traditionally placed as one of the basalmost basilosaurids, except for a 2023 study that places it within the family Pachycetinae close to Neoceti. Supayacetus is monotypic, meaning the genus includes only a single species: S. muizoni.

== Discovery and naming ==
Supayacetus is known from the holotype specimen MUSM 1465, a partial skeleton consisting of assorted remains including a badly weathered skull, various vertebrae and ribs, teeth as well as parts of the forelimbs and the sternum. As Ocucajea, it was collected in the Archaeocete Valley site, located within the middle Eocene (40.4 to 37.2 million years ago) Paracas Formation of the Pisco Basin, Peru.

The genus is named after Supay, the Incan god of death and ruler of the underworld, in combination with the suffix "cetus" ("ketos"), Ancient Greek for whale. The species name S. muizoni honours palaeontologist Christian de Muizon who has contributed considerably to Peruvian palaeontology.

== Description ==
Although the holotype skull is only poorly preserved due to having undergone extensive weathering, one of the tympanic bullae is still rather complete. Its shape is square and a horizontal keel is present. This keel extends onto the involucrum's posterior surface, the bulb's thickened inner edge. The keel then further continues along the medial (inner) side of the tympanic bulla and eventually comes around the front of the element. The ventral surface of the bulla is broadly divided into a lateral and a medial half by the median furrow, which spans about a third of the entire length of the bone. The eustachian outlet, an opening in the inner ear, is far less prominent than it is in Carolinacetus.

The manubrium, the front-most part of the sternum, is distinctly T-shaped unlike the wider and flatter manubria of derived basilosaurids. Instead this bone bears much closer resemblance to those of protocetids such as Georgiacetus, Rodhocetus and Eocetus and could subsequently be an ancestral feature retained by this taxon. The sternum also has a distinct rod-like mesosternal element that is likewise similar to that of Rodhocetus. The shoulder blade is only partially preserved, obscuring how large the scapular fossae were. However, it is apparent that the bone was broadly fan-like, with a relatively large infraspinous fossa and a shallow glenoid cavity where the humerus would articulate. The head of the humerus is described as being hemispherical, similar to those of Basilosaurus, Dorudon and Zygorhiza. The greater tubercle is located further down the shaft than the head and is similar in proportions to what is seen in Dorudon. Both it and the lesser tuberosity are well-defined. The shaft of the humerus is broad and flat and forms a prominent deltapectoral crest, another feature shared by Basilosaurus, Dorudon and Zygorhiza. Eventually, the humerus ends in a single common surface that articulates with both the radius and ulna, rather than dividing into capitulum and trochlea.

Like with other basilosaurids, the posterior teeth of Supayacetus feature a large central crown with accessory denticles before and after it. In the case of Supayacetus, the cheek teeth bear only two such denticles behind the central peak, however little else can be said about them as most of the anteromedial section of the holotype tooth is missing. This also means that it is not possible to precisely identify whether the tooth was a premolar or a molar, though the latter is deemed more likely. Overall the denticles are very prominent, much larger than those of Georgiacetus and remingtonocetids.

Based on skull elements, Supayacetus was probably larger than Protocetus but smaller than the majority of other basilosaurids.

== Phylogeny ==
When described in 2011, the position of Supayacetus among basilosaurids was not well understood, with the original authors simply placing it within an unresolved Basilosauridae featuring it, Basilosaurus, Dorudon and Ocucajea. The paper however did already remark on the notably basal anatomy of the sternum, which would again be noted by Gol'din and colleagues in 2014. Providing a more detailed phylogeny with a much greater number of taxa, they place Supayacetus as a very basal basilosaurid slightly less derived than Basilotritus (which some authors consider a synonym of Pachycetus).

- - Pakicetus
  - - Maiacetus
    - Rodhocetus
    - - Artiocetus
      - - Qaisracetus
        - - Aegyptocetus
          - Protocetus
          - Carolinacetus
          - Gaviacetus
          - - Eocetus
            - Georgiacetus
            - - Babiacetus
              - - - Supayacetus
                  - - - MUSM 1443
                      - Basilotritus
                    - - Zygorhiza
                      - - Chrysocetus
                        - - - Saghacetus
                            - Ancalecetus
                          - - Cynthiacetus
                            - - Basilosaurus
                              - Dorudon
                - - Ocucajea
                  - - Kekenodontidae
                    - Neoceti

A markedly different position was recovered by Antar and colleagues in 2023, whose work stands out for two reasons. For one, their phylogenetic analysis weakly supports the idea that Supayacetus wasn't simply basal to Basilotritus/Pachycetus, but actually formed a monophyletic clade with the two then-recognized species and Antaecetus, which would place it in the family Pachycetinae. More importantly, this family was recovered not as basal to other basilosaurids, but more derived, being placed as the sister group to the Neoceti.

- Pelagiceti
  - Eocetus
  - - - - Chrysocetus
        - - Ocucajea
          - Tutcetus
      - - Zygorhiza
        - - - Saghacetus
            - Ancalecetus
          - - Basilosaurus
            - - Dorudon
              - Pontogeneus peruvianus
    - - - Supayacetus
        - - Pachycetus paulsonii
          - - Pachycetus wardii
            - Antaecetus aithai
      - Neoceti

== Paleobiology ==
The Paracas Formation is thought to preserve an environment close to the shore with cold water temperatures as indicated by the specific species of foraminifera found there. The same sediments also yielded the scales of anchoveta and sardines, which generally correlate with cold water environments like today's Humboldt current. Supayacetus inhabited these waters with the distantly related Ocucajea.
