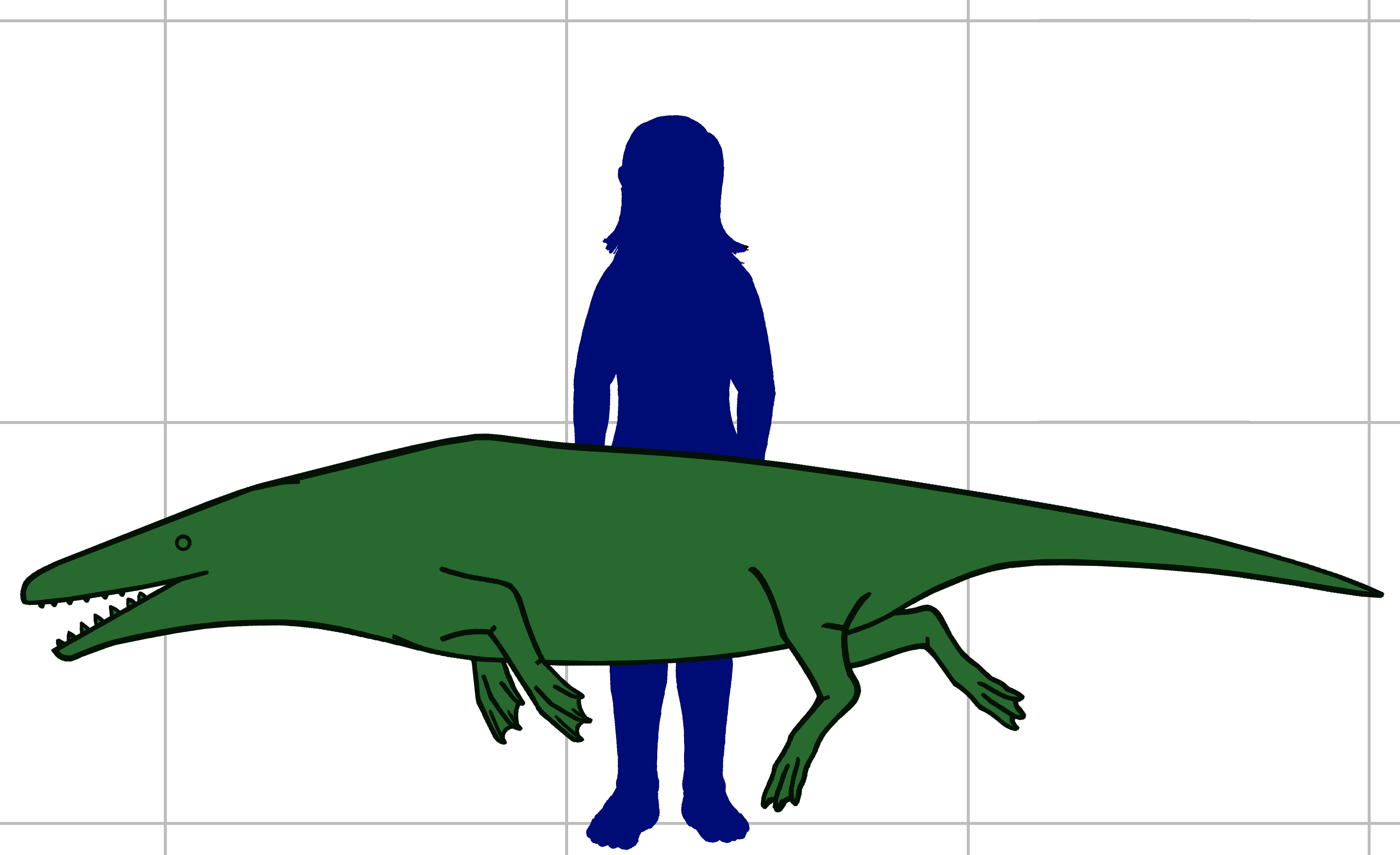
- Drawing of basic outline of Qaisracetus.

Scientific classification
- Domain: Eukaryota
- Kingdom: Animalia
- Phylum: Chordata
- Class: Mammalia
- Order: Artiodactyla
- Suborder: Whippomorpha
- Infraorder: Cetacea
- Family: †Protocetidae
- Subfamily: †Protocetinae
- Genus: †Qaisracetus; Gingerich et al. 2001

Species
- †Q. arifi Gingerich et al. 2001

= Qaisracetus =

Qaisracetus Temporal range: Middle Eocene, 48.6–40.4 Ma

Genus of mammals

Qaisracetus is an extinct protocetid early whale known from the Eocene (Lutetian, 48.6 to 40.4 million years ago) of Baluchistan, Pakistan (31.0°N 70.2°E, paleocoordinates 12.4°N 65.7°E).

== Etymology ==
The genus is named after the Qaisrani Baloch tribe which assisted Gingerich and his team during their field work. "Qaisra" is also etymologically close to the royal title used in Persian and many Indo-European languages (e.g. Kaiser, Czar, Caesar). The species is named for Muhammad Arif, former paleontologist at the Geological Survey of Pakistan who contributed significantly to archaeocete paleontology in Pakistan.

== Description ==
Qaisracetus is known from a dozen specimens, all found in or near the type locality. Among them are several well-preserved elements, including a well-preserved skull, partial skulls and braincases, several vertebrae including an almost complete sacrum, a left innominate, ribs, and partial limb elements.

Qaisracetus is smaller than Pappocetus and Babiacetus but larger than Indocetus. Qaisracetus arifi is almost as complete as Rodhocetus kasranii, the most complete articulated skeleton of a protocetid, and they were similar in size: the latter had an estimated body weight of 620 kg (1,370 lb), compared to 590 kg (1,300 lb) for the former.

Qaisracetus has a generalized protocetid skull with the external nares located relatively anteriorly (above C^{1}) and a relatively broad frontal shield. The rostrum is narrower in Qaisracetus than in Takracetus.

The four sacral vertebrae are only partially fused: the first two are solidly fused, the third is locked in place by rib-like processes (a pleurapophyseal synchondrosis), while the fourth has a caudal (tail-like) morphology including two ventrals chevron processes. The fusion between S1 and S2 distinguished Qaisracetus from other protocetids such as Protocetus, Rodhocetus, Gaviacetus, Natchitochia, and Georgiacetus. Qaisracetus' vertebrae are not dense and thick like in Eocetus. In contrast to Qaisracetus, Rodhocetus has a sacrum where none of the vertebrae have fused centra, which is derived to be a protocetid, but Rodhocetus is primitive in retaining pleurapophyseal connections between all sacral vertebrae. The sacral morphology of Rodhocetus and Qaisracetus indicate protocetids represent a wide range of specializations, although which is ancestral to later whales is unclear.

== Palaeoecology ==
Because of similarities in its dental microwear patterns to those of present-day orcas and hyenas, Q. arifi is believed to have eaten other marine mammals.

== Bibliography ==
- Gingerich, Philip D; Haq, U; Khan, H; Zalmout, S (2001). "Eocene stratigraphy and archaeocete whales (Mammalia, Cetacea) of Drug Lahar in the eastern Sulaiman range, Balochistan (Pakistan)". Contributions from the Museum of Paleontology, University of Michigan. 30 (11): 269–319. hdl:2027.42/48661. OCLC 50061585.
