= Crenatocetus =

Crenatocetus Temporal range: Middle Eocene, 45–43.5 Ma

Scientific classification
- Domain: Eukaryota
- Kingdom: Animalia
- Phylum: Chordata
- Class: Mammalia
- Order: Artiodactyla
- Infraorder: Cetacea
- Family: †Protocetidae
- Subfamily: †Protocetinae
- Genus: †Crenatocetus; McLeod & Barnes 2008

Species
- †C. rayi

Genus of mammals

Crenatocetus (from Latin: crena, "notch", and cetus, "whale") is an extinct genus of protocetid early whale containing one species, Crenatocetus rayi, that lived along the Atlantic Coastal Plain of the United States during the Lutetian in the late middle Eocene. The species is named in honour of paleontologist Clayton E. Ray, former curator at the National Museum of Natural History.

The skull is estimated to be 75 cm (30 in) long, which makes Crenatocetus a mid-sized protocetid. Georgiacetus (from Georgia) is an older and more primitive close relative, while Pappocetus (from Nigeria) is a younger and more derived relative.

The holotype USNM 392014, recovered in 1985 in a truck load of "marine marl" probably transported from New Bern, North Carolina, is two incomplete dentaries with a left P_{4} and broken M_{1-3}; a right partial P_{4}, partial M_{1-2}, and a complete M_{3}. The type locality is the Martin Marietta New Bern Quarry, Craven County, North Carolina (35.1°N 77.1°W, paleocoordinates 35.1°N 66.4°W).
