= Dhedacetus =

Dhedacetus Temporal range: Middle Eocene, 48.6–40.4 Ma

Scientific classification
- Kingdom: Animalia
- Phylum: Chordata
- Class: Mammalia
- Infraclass: Placentalia
- Order: Artiodactyla
- Infraorder: Cetacea
- Family: †Protocetidae
- Genus: †Dhedacetus; Bajpai and Thewissen, 2014
- Species: †D. hyaeni

Binomial name
- †Dhedacetus hyaeni Bajpai and Thewissen, 2014

Genus of mammals

Dhedacetus hyaeni is a protocetid cetacean from the middle Eocene (late Lutetian, 42 mya). It is the only species in the genus Dhedacetus. The type specimen was recovered from the Indian Harudi Formation near the town of Dhedadi, Kutch.

== Description ==
Only one skull and some vertebra are known. D. hyaeni is the smallest protocetid from Kutch. Its premolars and molars are about the same size as in other protocetids such as Babiacetus, Rodhocetus and Maiacetus. It has a long, broad snout and high ocular orbits.

The genus name comes from the town close by and the species name comes from a local hyena.
