= Togocetus =

Togocetus Temporal range: Late Eocene, 46–44 Ma

Scientific classification
- Kingdom: Animalia
- Phylum: Chordata
- Class: Mammalia
- Order: Artiodactyla
- Infraorder: Cetacea
- Family: †Protocetidae
- Genus: †Togocetus; Gingerich & Cappetta 2014
- Species: †T. traversei

Binomial name
- †Togocetus traversei Gingerich & Cappetta 2014

Genus of mammals

Togocetus ("Togo whale") is a genus of extinct cetacean from the Lutetian (lower Eocene) of Togo, known from a fossilized skeleton discovered a few kilometers north-east of Lomé.

== Discovery and description ==
The skeleton was found in a phosphate mining area, Kpogamé-Hahotoé, which is located just north of Lake Togo. It was embedded in a phospharenite bone bed dating back to 46 – 44 million years ago, and overlying an older rock unit, the Tabligbo Group. The remains were described in 2014 by Philip D. Gingerich and Henri Cappetta, who established for it the new monotypic genus Togocetus and the new species T. traversei, dedicated to Michel Traverse.

According to the two authors, Togocetus was a semiaquatic animal which must have weighed around 300–400 kilograms (660–880 lb). It was a protocetid with rather primitive traits such as a still quite long neck, a digitigrade manus and a swim-specialized pes. It shared many similarities with the protocetid genera Protocetus and Pappocetus, the main differences being a smaller mandibular canal, the loss of the fovea capitis femoris (hence of the ligament of head of femur) and some traits related to the molar trigonids. Later analysis of ear structure evidence originally attributed to Togocetus raised some question regarding established understanding of protocetid evolution. The original analysis revealed a contradiction in assumed relationship between ear ossicle structure and mandibular canal size; later research and additional evidence revealed multiple places where more modern, specialized traits were blended unexpectedly with archaic ones, causing some controversy. Despite the fragmentary nature of the fossil record and the subtleties differentiating protocetids, T. traversei has consistently been shown to have unique features defining it, including a completely novel entoglenoid shape and several fossae otherwise not seen in contemporary cetaceans.

== Bibliography ==
Gingerich, P. D.; Cappetta, H. (2014). "A new archaeocete and other marine mammals (Cetacea and Sirenia) from lower middle Eocene phosphate deposits of Togo". Journal of Paleontology. 88 (1): 109–129. Bibcode:2014JPal...88..109G. doi:10.1666/13-040. S2CID 85915213.

MKassegne, K. E (11 June 2021). "First partial cranium of Togocetus from Kpogamé (Togo) and the protocetid diversity in the Togolese phosphate basin". Annales de Paléontologie. 107 (2) 102488. Bibcode:2021AnPal.10702488K. doi:10.1016/j.annpal.2021.102488. S2CID 236757400.

Mourlam, M.J.; Orliac, M.J. (2017). "Protocetid (cetacea, artiodactyla) bullae and petrosals from the Middle Eocene locality of KPOGAMÉ, Togo: New insights into the early history of cetacean hearing". Journal of Systematic Palaeontology. 16 (8): 621–644. Bibcode:2018JSPal..16..621M. doi:10.1080/14772019.2017.1328378. S2CID 89774296.
