= Ameki Formation =

Geological formation in Nigeria

- Stratigraphic range: Lutetian-Bartonian
- Type: Geological formation
- Unit of: Bende-Ameki Group

Lithology
- Primary: Shale
- Other: Sandstone, siltstone

Location
- Coordinates: 6.0°N 7.0°E
- Approximate paleocoordinates: 1.6°N 1.5°E
- Country: Nigeria
- Extent: Niger Delta Basin

Type section
- Named for: Ameki
- Ameki Formation (Nigeria)

The Ameki Formation is a Lutetian to Bartonian geological formation located in Nigeria. It belongs to the Bende-Ameki Group, which also consists of two formations namely Nanka Formation, Nsugbe Formation.

== Fossil content ==
Among others, the following fossils have been reported in the formation:

=== Mammals ===
Mammals reported from the Ameki Formation
| Genus | Species | Presence | Material | Notes | Images |
|---|---|---|---|---|---|
| Pappocetus | P. lugardi | Ombialla District. | Mandibles. | A protocetid. | |

=== Reptiles ===
==== Birds ====
Birds reported from the Ameki Formation
| Genus | Species | Presence | Material | Notes | Images |
|---|---|---|---|---|---|
| Gigantornis | G. eaglesomei | | | A pelagornithid. | |

==== Squamates ====
Squamates reported from the Ameki Formation
| Genus | Species | Presence | Material | Notes | Images |
|---|---|---|---|---|---|
| Pterosphenus | | | Trunk vertebra. | A palaeophiid. | |

==== Turtles ====
Turtles reported from the Ameki Formation
| Genus | Species | Presence | Material | Notes | Images |
|---|---|---|---|---|---|
| Cosmochelys | C. dolloi | Ombialla District. | Portions of carapace. | A dermochelyid. | |

=== Invertebrates ===
==== Cephalopods ====
Cephalopods reported from the Ameki Formation
| Genus | Species | Presence | Material | Notes | Images |
|---|---|---|---|---|---|
| Deltoidonautilus | D. nwajidei | | Multiple specimens. | A nautiloid. | |

== See also ==
- List of fossil sites
