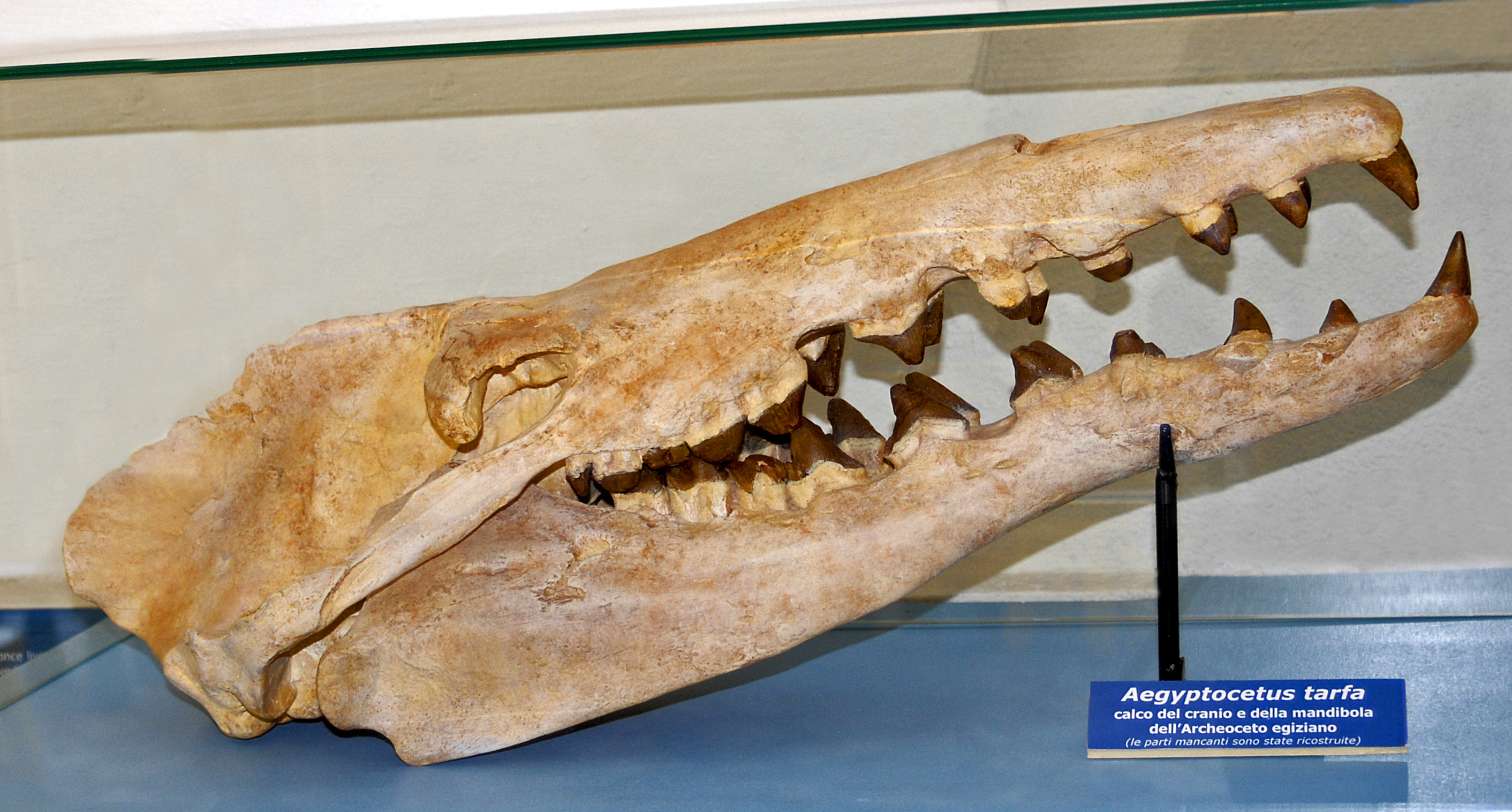
- Reconstructed skull

Scientific classification
- Domain: Eukaryota
- Kingdom: Animalia
- Phylum: Chordata
- Class: Mammalia
- Order: Artiodactyla
- Suborder: Whippomorpha
- Infraorder: Cetacea
- Family: †Protocetidae
- Genus: †Aegyptocetus; Bianucci & Gingerich 2011
- Species: †A. tarfa

Binomial name
- †Aegyptocetus tarfa Bianucci & Gingerich 2011

= Aegyptocetus =

Aegyptocetus Temporal range: Middle Eocene, 41–40 Ma

Species of mammal

Aegyptocetus is an extinct genus of protocetid archaeocete whale known from Egypt.

== Taxonomy ==
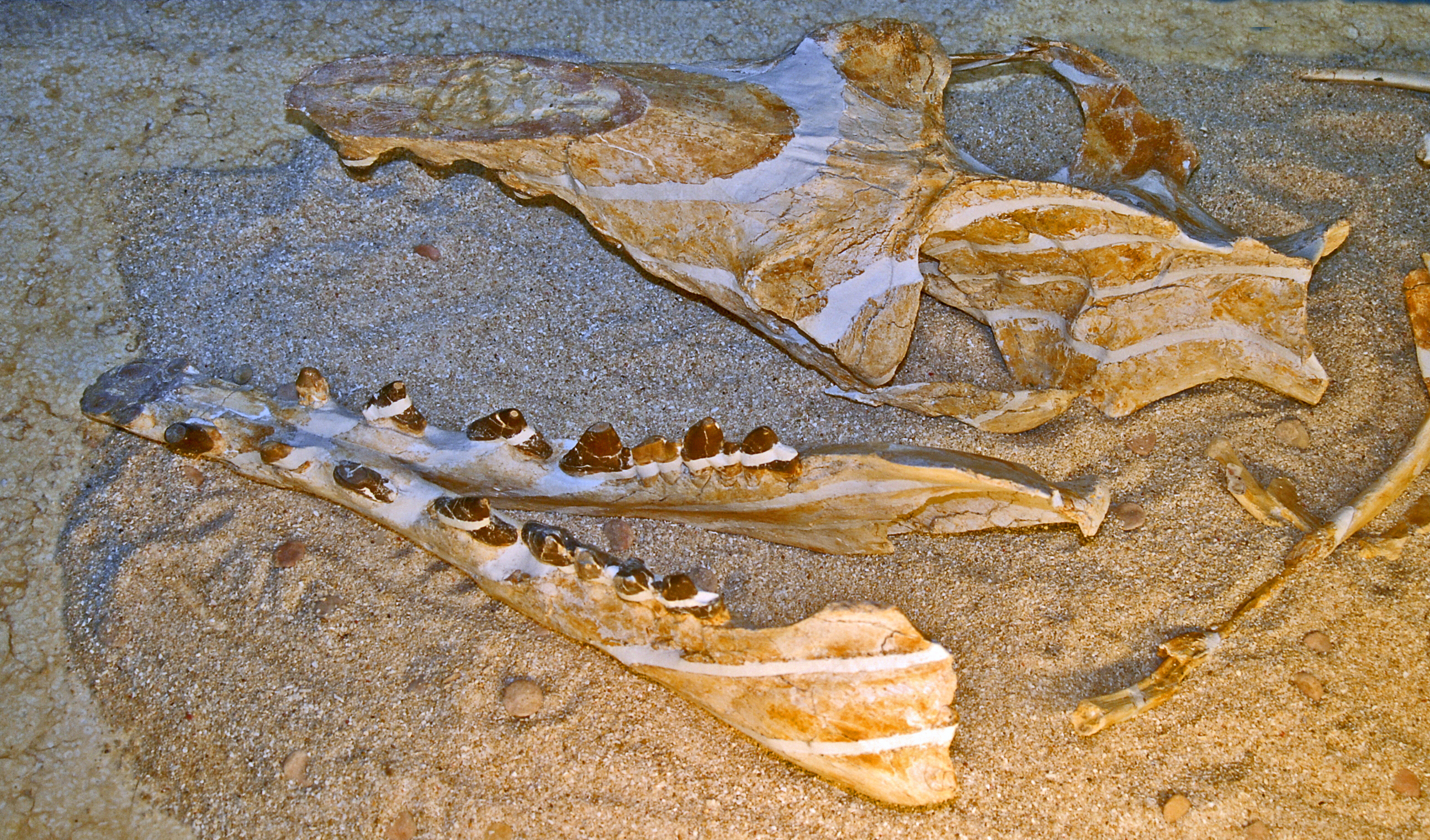
The holotype MSNTUP I-15459 of Aegyptocetus tarfa

Aegyptocetus is known from the articulated holotype MSNTUP I-15459, an almost complete cranium, lower jaws (with teeth) and a partial postcranial skeleton (cervical and thoracic vertebrae and ribs). The specimen was recovered when marbleized limestone was imported commercially to Italy. It was collected in the Khashm el-Raqaba limestone quarry (28.5°N 31.8°E, paleocoordinates 22.9°N 27.2°E) from the Gebel Hof Formation on the northern flank of Wadi Tarfa in the Eastern Desert of Egypt, dating to the late Mokattamian age of the middle Eocene, about 41 to 40 million years ago. Its cause of death may have been an attack by a large shark as pattern of shark tooth marks preserved on the ribs.

Aegyptocetus was first named by Giovanni Bianucci and Philip D. Gingerich in 2011 and the type species is Aegyptocetus tarfa. The generic name is derived from Aegyptus, Latin for Egypt, and cetus, Latin for whale. The specific name refers to Wadi Tarfa, the desert valley where the holotype was found.

== Description ==
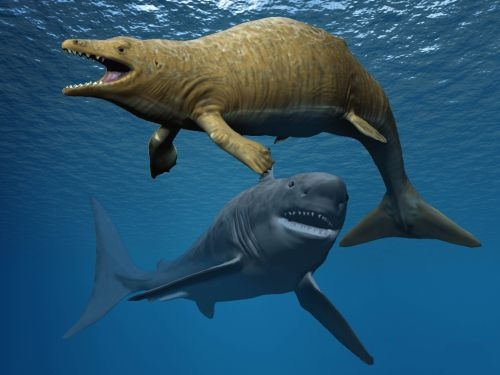
Restoration of Aegyptocetus and a shark

Aegyptocetus had features in its cranium and dentaries adapted for hearing in water. Its thoracic vertebrae (T1–T8), however, had long neural spines which is a characteristic of the weight-bearing system of land-living mammals retained in protocetids, such as Rodhocetus and Qaisracetus, but absent in the more derived basilosaurids, such as Dorudon. This suggests that Aegyptocetus, like other protocetids, was able to support its body on land and probably was semi-aquatic.

=== Skull ===
The endocranial reconstruction of Aegyptocetus revealed well-defined olfactory bulbs situated at the end of elongated olfactory tracts, resembling the configuration seen in Protocetus. These features suggest that Aegyptocetus retained a functional olfactory system during its semi-aquatic stage. The skull also preserves a full complement of turbinals, including intricately folded ethmoturbinals and maxilloturbinals—key components of the mammalian olfactory apparatus. These structures are critical for increasing the surface area available for olfactory epithelium and enhancing the ability to detect odorants.The presence of anatomical features such as the dorsal nasal meatus and the olfactory recess further supports the hypothesis that Aegyptocetus retained airborne olfaction, despite its aquatic adaptations. These traits suggest that olfactory capabilities in this species were likely comparable to those of terrestrial artiodactyls, its closest extant relatives.
