= Tupelocetus =

Tupelocetus Temporal range: Middle Eocene, 41.3–38.0 Ma

Scientific classification
- Kingdom: Animalia
- Phylum: Chordata
- Class: Mammalia
- Infraclass: Placentalia
- Order: Artiodactyla
- Infraorder: Cetacea
- Family: †Protocetidae
- Subfamily: †Georgiacetinae
- Genus: †Tupelocetus; M. L. Gibson et al. 2019
- Species: †T. palmeri

Binomial name
- †Tupelocetus palmeri M. L. Gibson et al. 2019

Extinct genus of cetaceans

Tupelocetus is an extinct genus of early cetacean found in the Bartonian (41.3 to 38.0 mya) Middle Eocene Tupelo Bay Formation (33.34444°N 80.23027°W), in Berkeley County, South Carolina.

Tupelocetus is known from a single fossil specimen, holotype ChM PV6950, which consists of a partial cranium consisting of both P2 teeth (premolars), the right orbital, posterior nasal, and multiple pieces of the ears, including complete petrosal bones and rear processes of the tympanic bones. The holotype was collected in 1999 by Billy Palmer, from whom the singular species of the genus, Tupelocetus palmeri receives its name. The specimen Palmer collected, and later prepared and donated, is now part of the Charleston Museum Vertebrate Paleontology Collection.

Tupelocetus differed from other protocetids due to its deep occipital cavity, monocuspid premolars, and large nasal processes. It has been found via tip-dating to be one of the most crownward (or latest surviving) georgiacetine protocetids, along with the genus Aegicetus.
