= Natchitochia =

Nachitochia Temporal range: Middle Eocene, 40.4–37.2 Ma

Scientific classification
- Domain: Eukaryota
- Kingdom: Animalia
- Phylum: Chordata
- Class: Mammalia
- Order: Artiodactyla
- Infraorder: Cetacea
- Family: †Protocetidae
- Subfamily: †Georgiacetinae
- Genus: †Natchitochia; Uhen 1998

Species
- †N. jonesi Uhen 1998

Extinct protocetid early whale

Natchitochia is an extinct protocetid early whale known from the Middle Eocene (Bartonian, 40.4 to 37.2 million years ago) Cook Mountain Formation in Natchitoches Parish, Louisiana (31.7°N 93.1°W, paleocoordinates 32.6°N 84.5°W).

Natchitochia is known from three incomplete ribs and thirteen vertebrae of which four are thoracics, five lumbars, one sacral, two caudals, and one of indeterminable position. Natchitochia is significantly larger than most other early protocetids, except Eocetus and Pappocetus. The vertebrae of Natchitochia are smaller than those of Eocetus and lack (1) elongated lumbar centra and (2) the ventral keel seen on the vertebrae of Pappocetus. The ribs are smaller than those of Pappocetus.

The fragmentary specimen was collected in 1943 during a ground water survey and then sent to the United States National Museum where Remington Kellogg identified it as a new genus of archaeocete but never formally described it. Uhen 1998 finally described and named the genus and the species; the genus for the type locality and the species honors discoverer Paul H. Jones.
