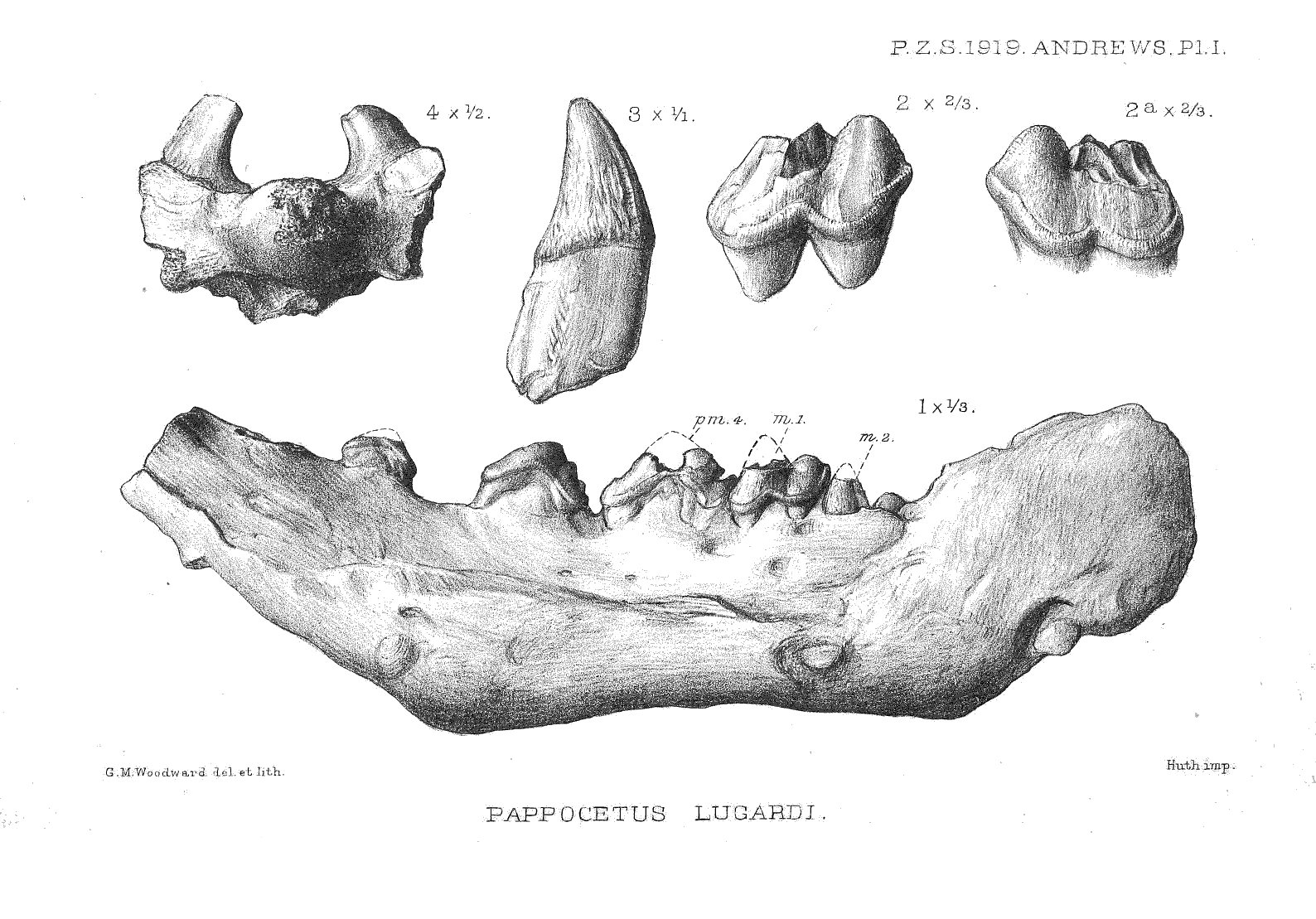
- Pappocetus lugardi specimens from Andrews 1919
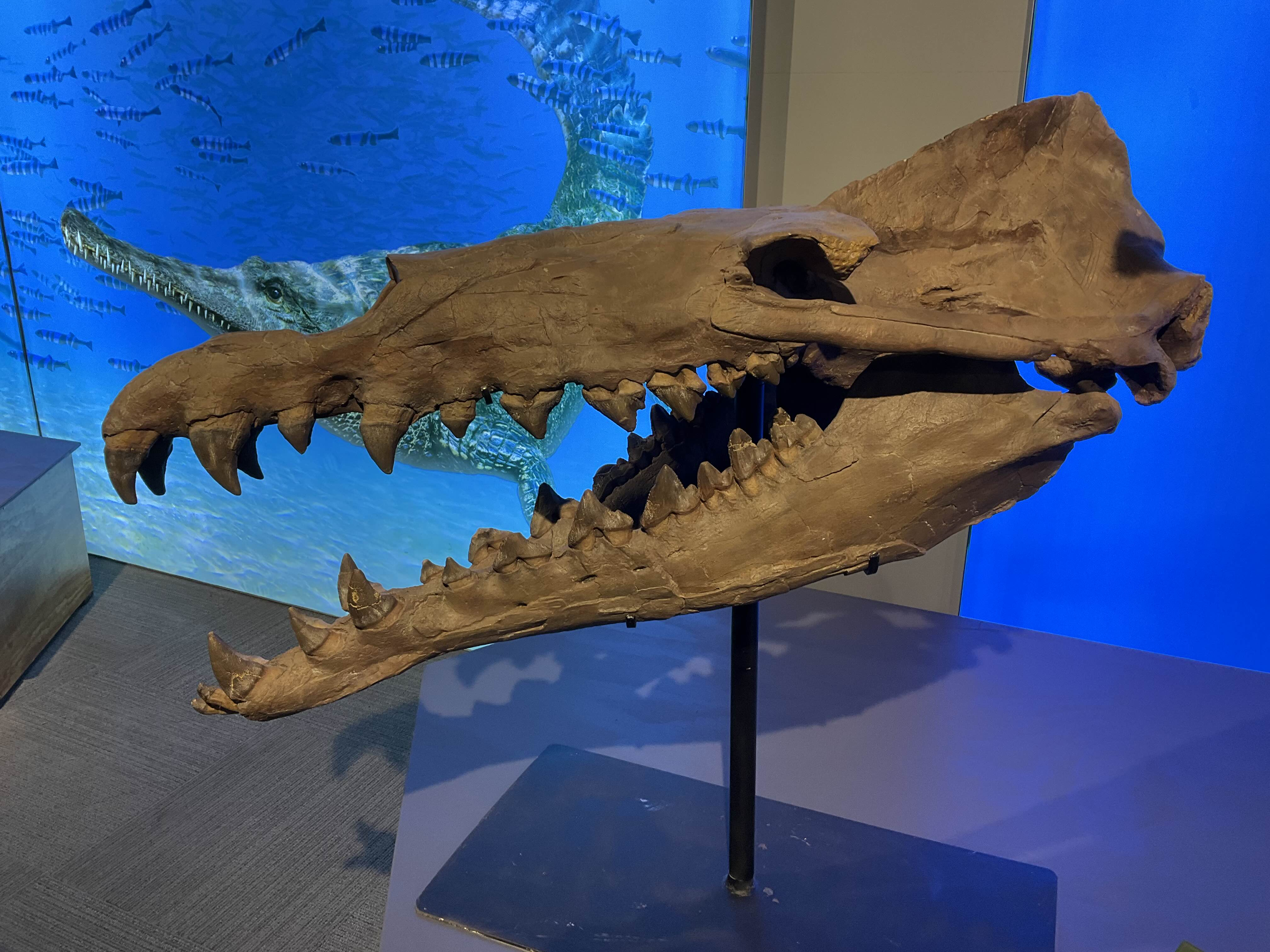
- Reconstructed skull at the Vancouver Aquarium

Scientific classification
- Kingdom: Animalia
- Phylum: Chordata
- Class: Mammalia
- Order: Artiodactyla
- Infraorder: Cetacea
- Family: †Protocetidae
- Subfamily: †Georgiacetinae
- Genus: †Pappocetus; Andrews 1919

Species
- †P. lugardi Andrews 1919

= Pappocetus =

Pappocetus Temporal range: Late Eocene, 40.4–37.2 Ma }

Genus of mammals

Pappocetus (meaning "grandfather whale") is an extinct protocetid cetacean known from the Eocene of southern Nigeria's Ameki Formation and Togo. More recently, fossil teeth and femurs have also been discovered in the Aridal Formation of the Sahara Desert in southwestern Morocco.

== Etymology ==
The species is named after Sir Frederick Lugard who sent one of the specimens to Andrews.

== Description ==
Pappocetus is the largest known protocetid (if Eocetus is recovered as a basilosaurid). Its body size was estimated to be similar to that of Eocetus. It also differs from all other known protocetid genera by the step-like notch on the ventral margin of the mandible below M_{2} and M_{3}; from Indocetus and Rodhocetus by the deciduous double-rooted P_{1}; from Protocetus and Babiacetus by the presence of accessory cuspules; and from Babiacetus by the unfused symphysis terminating just before P_{3}. Its molar morphology is similar to Georgiacetus.

=== Specimens ===
The type specimen BMNH M11414 is an incomplete left mandible with symphysis, a deciduous premolar, and unerupted molars. It was found in Bartonian (40.4 to 37.2 million years ago) layers of the Ameki Formation (6.0°N 7.0°E, paleocoordinates 1.8°N 1.7°E) in southern Nigeria.

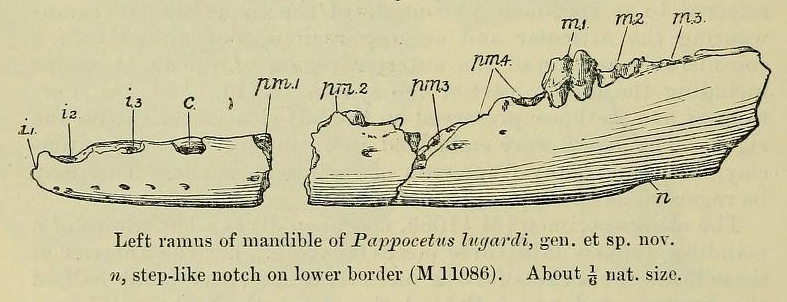
Left ramus of the mandible

The specimen M11086 is a left mandibular ramus broken in three pieces with sockets for canines and incisors and the front part of a single-rooted P_{1}. Andrews, to whom the two specimens were brought separately, noted that they "to some extent supplement one another, so that the structure is fairly clear" and thus estimated the size and morphology of the missing parts by comparing the specimens to each other.
