= Mesocetus =

Mesocetus Temporal range: Miocene

Scientific classification
- Kingdom: Animalia
- Phylum: Chordata
- Class: Mammalia
- Infraclass: Placentalia
- Order: Artiodactyla
- Infraorder: Cetacea
- Superfamily: Balaenopteroidea
- Family: †Tranatocetidae
- Genus: †Mesocetus van Beneden, 1880

Species
- see text

Extinct genus of mammals

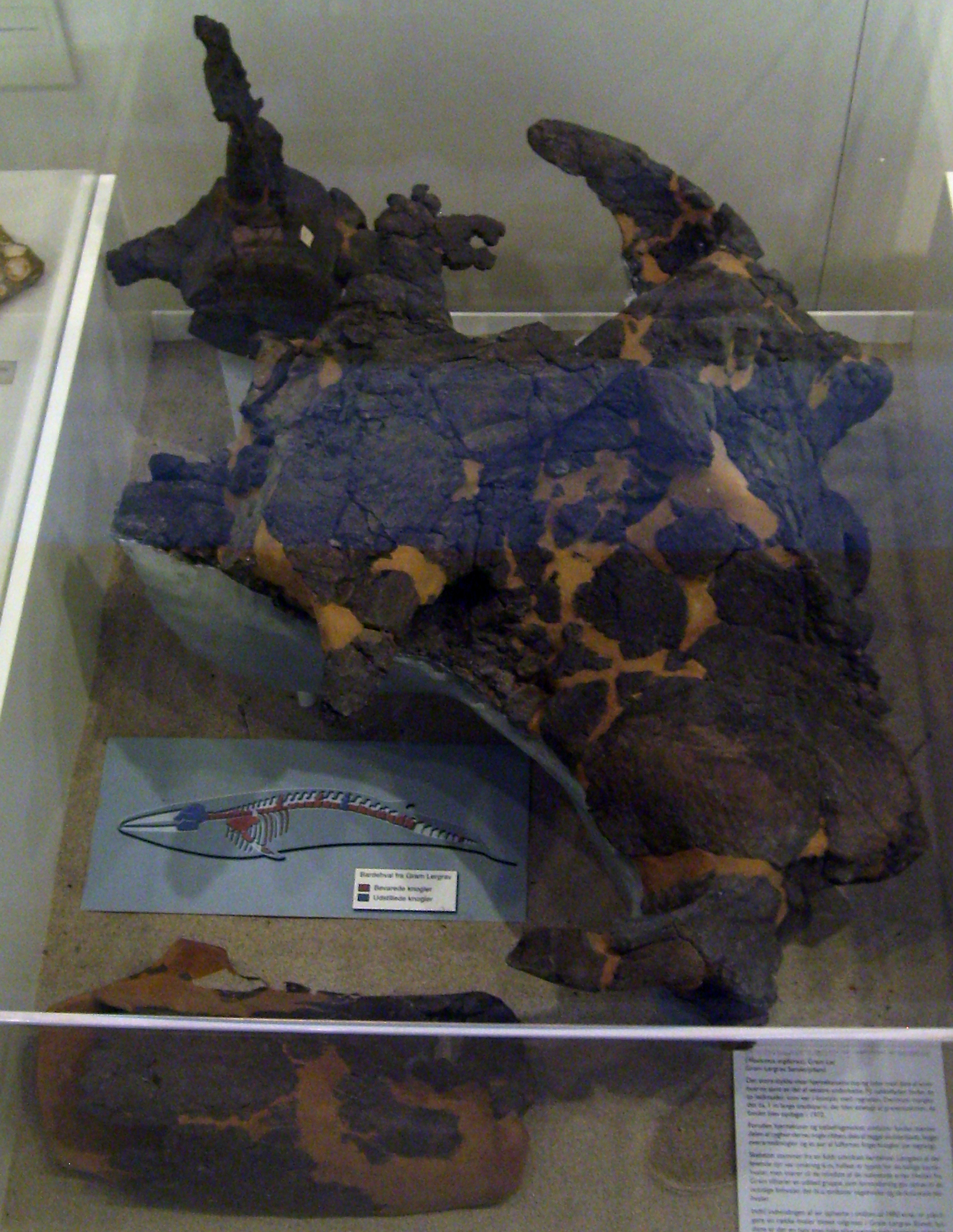

Mesocetus is an extinct genus of baleen whale from the Miocene of Europe and North America.

== Description ==
Mesocetus is similar to other tranatocetids in having rostral bones that override the frontals and contact the parietals, nasals dividing the maxillae on the vertex, a dorsoventrally bent occipital shield with a more horizontal anterior portion and more vertical posterior portion, and a tympanic bulla with short, narrow anterior portion with rounded or squared anterior end and wider and higher posterior portion that is particularly swollen in the posteroventral area. Shared characters with Tranatocetus include posterior ends of premaxillae fused with the maxillae and divided on the vertex by long, narrow and high (vertical plate-like) nasals and cervical vertebrae with wide transverse foramina, almost as wide as the centra.

== Species ==
- Mesocetus agrami Van Beneden, 1886; late Miocene (Serravallian) of Croatia.
- Mesocetus aquitanicus Flot, 1896; France.
- Mesocetus hungaricus Kadic, 1907; Austria.
- Mesocetus longirostris van Beneden, 1880 (type); Belgium.
- Mesocetus pinguis van Beneden, 1880 (nomen dubium); Belgium.
- Mesocetus siphunculus Cope, 1895; United States.

=== Formerly assigned to Mesocetus ===
- Mesocetus latifrons von Beneden, 1880; now referred to Aglaocetus as A. latifrons
- Mesocetus schweinfurthi Fraas 1904a; now referred to Eocetus as E. schweinfurthi
- Mesocetus argillarius Roth, 1978 = Tranatocetus argillarius
