= Gaviacetus =

Gaviacetus Temporal range: Middle Eocene, 45–43.5 Ma

Scientific classification
- Kingdom: Animalia
- Phylum: Chordata
- Class: Mammalia
- Infraclass: Placentalia
- Order: Artiodactyla
- Infraorder: Cetacea
- Family: †Protocetidae
- Genus: †Gaviacetus; Gingerich, Arif, and Clyde, 1995
- Species: †G. razai

Binomial name
- †Gaviacetus razai Gingerich, Arif, and Clyde, 1995

Genus of mammals

Gaviacetus (from Latin Gavia, "loon" and cetus, "whale") is an extinct archaeocete whale that lived approximately 45 million years ago. Gaviacetus was named for its characteristic narrow rostrum and the fast pursuit predation suggested by its unfused sacral vertebrae.

== Location ==
The only known Gaviacetus razai specimen was found in Punjab, Pakistan. (30.1°N 70.4°E, paleocoordinates 11.6°N 65.5°E)

== Description ==
The skull of Gaviacetus is characteristic of protocetids, but the rostrum is extremely narrow anterior to P^{3}, suggesting some kind of trophic specialization.

The well-preserved auditory bulla in Gingerich, Arif & Clyde 1995's specimen is dense like in other archaeocetes, is equipped with a prominent sigmoid process, but has 3-5 contacts with the rest of the cranium.

Preserved alveoli (tooth sockets) show that Gaviacetus had double- and triple-rooted cheek teeth, but some controversy remains regarding the number of molars. Based on other cranial characters, Gingerich, Arif & Clyde 1995 concluded that Gaviacetus is a protocetid (more primitive archeocetes with a third upper molar) and therefore assumed the presence of M^{3} though no traces thereof are preserved in their specimen. In opposition to this, Bajpai & Thewissen 1998, whose specimen is also lacking the essential maxillar part, thought the cranium above the very small M^{2} to be to narrow for the presence of M^{3}, hence indicating Gaviacetus is a basilosaurid (a more derived archaeocetes lacking a third upper molar). Uhen 2009 argued against this assignment until more solid evidence has been found.

The preserved sacral vertebra was not fused with its posterior neighbour, indicating that Gaviacetus was a tail-powered swimmer like Protocetus, better adapted to pursuit predation than Rodhocetus. The preserved transverse process of the sacral vertebra is distally expanded, suggesting a synchondrosal joint between the vertebral column and pelvis.

Although often represented as having small hind limbs, this is an inference from the general progression of other fossil species towards limb loss; the only postcranial remains found for Gaviacetus are a rib and several vertebrae. At least three popular science books misspell this genus as Gaviocetus.

== Taxonomic history ==
The genus Gaviacetus was established in 1995 with the description of G. razai. A second species, G. sahnii, was described in 1998, but transferred to its own genus, Kharodacetus in 2014 based on newly discovered remains.
