= Carolinacetus =

Carolinacetus Temporal range: Eocene (Bartonian), ~40 Ma

Scientific classification
- Kingdom: Animalia
- Phylum: Chordata
- Class: Mammalia
- Order: Artiodactyla
- Infraorder: Cetacea
- Family: †Protocetidae
- Subfamily: †Georgiacetinae
- Genus: †Carolinacetus; Geisler, Sanders & Luo 2005

Species
- †C. gingerichi Geisler, Sanders & Luo 2005

Genus of mammals

Carolinacetus is an extinct protocetid early whale found in the Bartonian aged Tupelo Bay Formation (33.3°N 79.7°W, paleocoordinates 33.3°N 70.9°W) in Berkeley County, South Carolina.

Carolinacetus is known from an incomplete cranium with portions of the right inner ear, a detached rostrum, and parts of both mandibles with 11 teeth. Preserved from the postcranium are 13 vertebrae and 15 ribs. The holotype was collected in 1994.

Several anatomical features identifies Carolinacetus as a protocetid including: external nares are located above the canine, the supraoccipital (in cetaceans, the part of the occipital bone located above the foramen magnum and directed backwards) is narrow and tubular, accessory cusps absent on M_{3}, a broad connection between the ectotympanic bulla and the falciform process of the squamosal, axis vertebra with large vertebral foramen.

In Carolinacetus the naral openings are located in front of P^{1}, making it the most basal North American cetacean. Carolinacetus is distinct from other North American cetaceans, it is 8–15% larger than Georgiacetus and differs from it in several cranial characters.
