= Makaracetus =

Makaracetus Temporal range: 45 Ma Late Lutetian

Scientific classification
- Kingdom: Animalia
- Phylum: Chordata
- Class: Mammalia
- Infraclass: Placentalia
- Order: Artiodactyla
- Infraorder: Cetacea
- Family: †Protocetidae
- Subfamily: †Makaracetinae; Gingerich et al. 2005
- Genus: †Makaracetus; Gingerich et al. 2005

Species
- †M. bidens Gingerich et al. 2005

Extinct protocetid early whale

Makaracetus is an extinct protocetid whale, the remains of which were found in 2004 in Lutetian layers of the Domanda Formation in the Sulaiman Range of Balochistan, Pakistan (30.1°N 69.8°E, paleocoordinates 11.7°N 65.0°E).

Makaracetus is unique among archaeocetes in its feeding adaptations; its proboscis and the hypertrophied facial muscles. The generic epithet is a portmanteau of Makara, an elephant-headed sea monster from Hindu mythology, and cetus, Latin for "whale". The species epithet, bidens, is Latin for "two-teeth", in reference to the retention of only two incisors in each premaxilla. Makaracetus' unique features even lead Gingerich et al. 2005 to propose a new classification of Protocetidae based on the degree of their aquatic adaptation; with Makarcetus alone in the subfamily Makaracetinae.

A combination of cranial features indicates that Makaracetus had a short, muscular proboscis similar to a tapir. There are broad and shallow narial grooves on the dorsal side of the premaxilla extending the nasal vestibule to the anterior end of the rostrum. These grooves are paralleled on the ventral side by extraordinary lateral fossae, stretching from the anterior maxilla and over the premaxilla. The rostrum is angled downwards, like in a dugong, and has a reduced number of incisors. Enlarged foramina in front of the orbits indicate that the rostrum had a rich blood supply.

No living mammal displays this combination of characteristics. The expanded nasal is present in tapirs, but they are not aquatic animals. The morphology of sirenian rostra is similar, but sirenians are herbivorous, whereas Makaracetus' dentition clearly indicate that it was carnivorous. Walrus cranial morphology is different, but they are aquatic and use specialized buccal and facial muscles to feed on molluscs, fossils of which are abundant in the Domanda Formation. They probably provide the best ecological model among living mammals. More complete fossils must be recovered before Makaracetus can be adequately described.
