= Phiomicetus =

Phiomicetus Temporal range: Middle Eocene, 43–42 Ma

Scientific classification
- Domain: Eukaryota
- Kingdom: Animalia
- Phylum: Chordata
- Class: Mammalia
- Order: Artiodactyla
- Infraorder: Cetacea
- Family: †Protocetidae
- Genus: †Phiomicetus; Gohar et al., 2021

Species
- †P. anubis Gohar et al., 2021 (type)

Genus of mammals

Phiomicetus is a genus of protocetid whale that lived between 43 and 42 million years ago during the Lutetian (middle Eocene) period in what is now Egypt. It had powerful jaws and large teeth that would have allowed it to hunt and tear large prey.

== Discovery and naming ==
Phiomicetus was unearthed in 2008 at Al Amaim, which lies on the southern margin of Wadi Al-Ruwayan in the Fayum Depression, in the Western Desert of Egypt. The holotype specimen, MUVP500, is the partial skeleton of a single individual that includes the cranium, right mandible, an incomplete left mandible, several teeth, fifth cervical vertebra, sixth thoracic vertebra, sixth left rib, and an isolated right rib. Phiomicetus is the first extinct whale to be discovered, scientifically described, and named by a team of Arab paleontologists.

The generic name Phiomicetus is derived from the Fayum Depression, the type locality where it was discovered, and the Latin term cetus meaning "whale". The specific name anubis is the Ancient Greek term for Inpu or Anpu, the ancient Egyptian god of death, mummification, the afterlife, and the Underworld. Anubis is usually depicted as a man with the head of a canid, and the authors chose the name due to the superficial similarity between the skulls of protocetids and canids.

== Description ==
Phiomicetus is placed in the transitional, semiaquatic family Protocetidae, of which it is the most basal member outside of the Indo-Pakistan region. Like all protocetids, it had large fore- and hindlimbs that could support the body on land. Its body length is estimated to be 3 metres (9.8 ft), and body mass 600 kilograms (1,300 lb). Features of the skull and mandible suggest that Phiomicetus had large temporal muscles in the jaw; combined with tooth wear patterns, this suggests a "strong raptorial feeding style" with large fish, turtles, and potentially other whales as prey, akin to modern-day seal-eating killer whales. The long neural spines on its thoracic vertebrae suggest that it was capable of supporting its own weight on land.

== See also ==
- Evolution of whales
