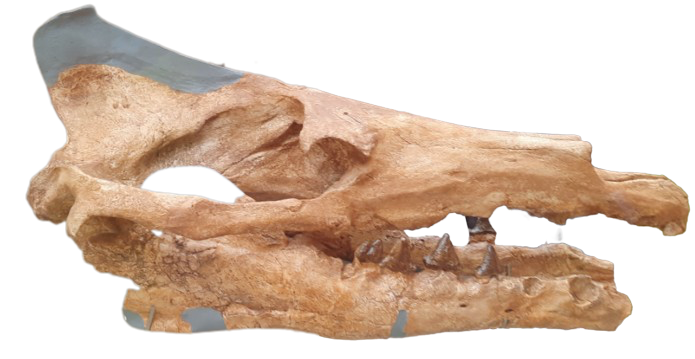
- Skull of A. clavis on display at Oxford University Museum of Natural History

Scientific classification
- Kingdom: Animalia
- Phylum: Chordata
- Class: Mammalia
- Order: Artiodactyla
- Infraorder: Cetacea
- Family: †Protocetidae
- Subfamily: †Protocetinae
- Genus: †Artiocetus; Gingerich et al., 2001
- Species: †A. clavis

Binomial name
- †Artiocetus clavis Gingerich et al., 2001

= Artiocetus =

Artiocetus Temporal range: Early Eocene, 47 Ma

Genus of mammals

Artiocetus is an extinct genus of early whales belonging to the family Protocetidae. It was a close relative to Rodhocetus and its tarsals indicate it resembled an artiodactyl.

== Etymology ==
Artiocetus' name arises from a combination of cetus and artiodactyl, as this fossil was the first to show that early whales possessed artiodactyl-like ankles.

Artiocetus belongs to the infraorder Cetacea, which includes whales, dolphins and porpoises. Cetus is a Latinized Greek word literally meaning "sea monster" and is used in biological names to mean "whale". It comes from Ancient Greek κῆτος (kētos), in reference to the sea monster goddess Ceto, daughter of Gaia and Pontus, and said to resemble a gigantic whale or fish.

Artiodactyla refers to the mammal order of even-toed ungulates the group containing cattle, deer, camels, giraffes, antelope, goats, sheep, pigs and hippopotamuses. If the animal has even number of toes, the weight is borne equally by the third and fourth toe. The shape of the astragalus is another key feature which has a double-pulley structure in artiodactyls, giving the foot greater flexibility.

== Description ==
Artiocetus clavis was a small whale measuring 2–3 m (6.6–9.8 ft) long. It existed in the early Lutetian age (47 million years ago) and is one of the oldest known protocetid archaeocetes. Though the whale may have been primarily aquatic, the discovery of ankle bones lends to the idea that this fossil may have been a transition between sea-based and land-based mammals. While whales eventually returned to the sea, the anthracotheres, ancestors of the hippopotamus, are thought to have descended from an ancestor shared with the whale.

Like Rodhocetus, Artiocetus had limbs comparable to Ambulocetus but larger fore and hind feet, which were probably webbed. They could probably move on land, but rather clumsily like a modern seal.

Protocetidae were the first group of whales to develop tail flukes, which suggests they were quick, agile predators. Though Protocetidae as a family possessed tail flukes, it has been suggested that Artiocetus did not. Thewissen et al. states that "Artiocetus had a long tail and thus probably lacked a tail fluke".

== Fossil finds ==
Fossils located in 2001 in the Balochistan Province of Pakistan showed that Artiocetus had both an astragalus and cuboid bone in the ankle (a diagnostic traits of artiodactyls), suggesting that early whales had fore and hind limbs. The distribution of fossils in Indo-Pakistan, Africa, Europe, and North America suggests that this species preferred a warmer sea climate, preferably in the tropics.

There is no commonly agreed ancestry of the whale, but they are thought to have evolved from an early group of carnivorous even-toed ungulates.

DNA studies have suggested that the hippopotamus is the closest land relative to the whale. Artiocetus fossils represent intermediate forms between land-living ungulates and whales, lending support to the theory that whales and hippopotami descended from a common ancestor.

The discovery of this fossil is important as it helped solidify the theory that whales shared a common ancestor with Artiodactyla. In 2005, an international team of scientists suggested that whales and hippopotami share a common water and terrestrial dwelling ancestor, which lived 50 to 60 million years ago. Two groups emerged from this common ancestor: early cetaceans, which in time returned to the sea permanently, and a large group of superficially pig-like land-based mammals called anthracotheres. The only surviving descendants of anthracotheres are the common and pygmy hippopotamuses.
