= Takracetus =

Takracetus Temporal range: Middle Eocene, 45–43.5 Ma

Scientific classification
- Kingdom: Animalia
- Phylum: Chordata
- Class: Mammalia
- Order: Artiodactyla
- Infraorder: Cetacea
- Family: †Protocetidae
- Genus: †Takracetus; Gingerich, Arif & Clyde 1995
- Species: †T. simus

Binomial name
- †Takracetus simus Gingerich, Arif & Clyde 1995

Genus of mammals

Takracetus was a primitive cetacean that lived approximately 45 million years ago in Pakistan. The type specimen (GSP-UM 3041) is a partial skull though the literature mentions a second more complete specimen.
