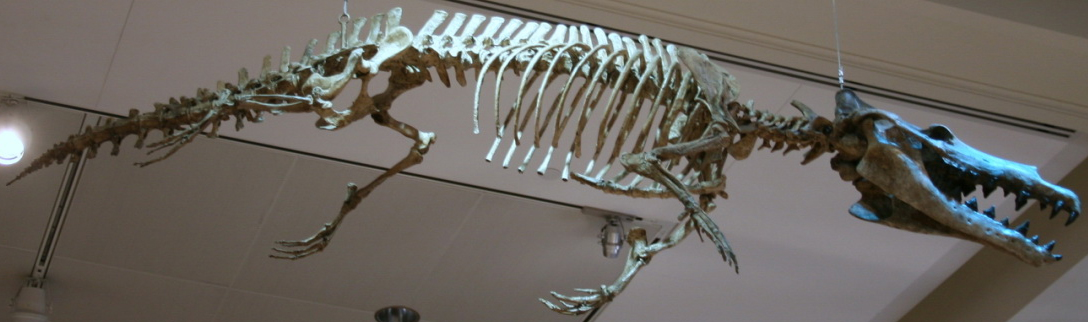
- Maiacetus

Scientific classification
- Kingdom: Animalia
- Phylum: Chordata
- Class: Mammalia
- Infraclass: Placentalia
- Order: Artiodactyla
- Infraorder: Cetacea
- Family: †Protocetidae; Stromer 1908

Subfamilies
- 3, See text

= Protocetidae =

Protocetidae Temporal range: Early Eocene to Late Eocene47.5–35 Ma

Family of mammals

Protocetidae, the protocetids, form a paraphyletic, diverse and heterogeneous group of extinct cetaceans known from Asia, Europe, Africa, South America, and North America.

== Description ==
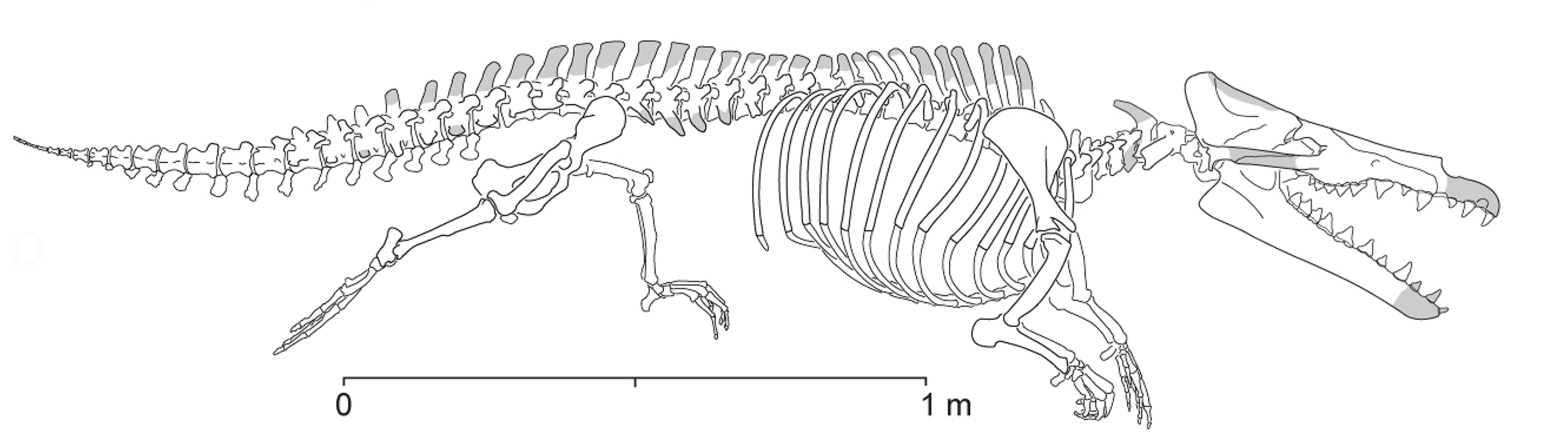
Skeletal drawing of Maiacetus.

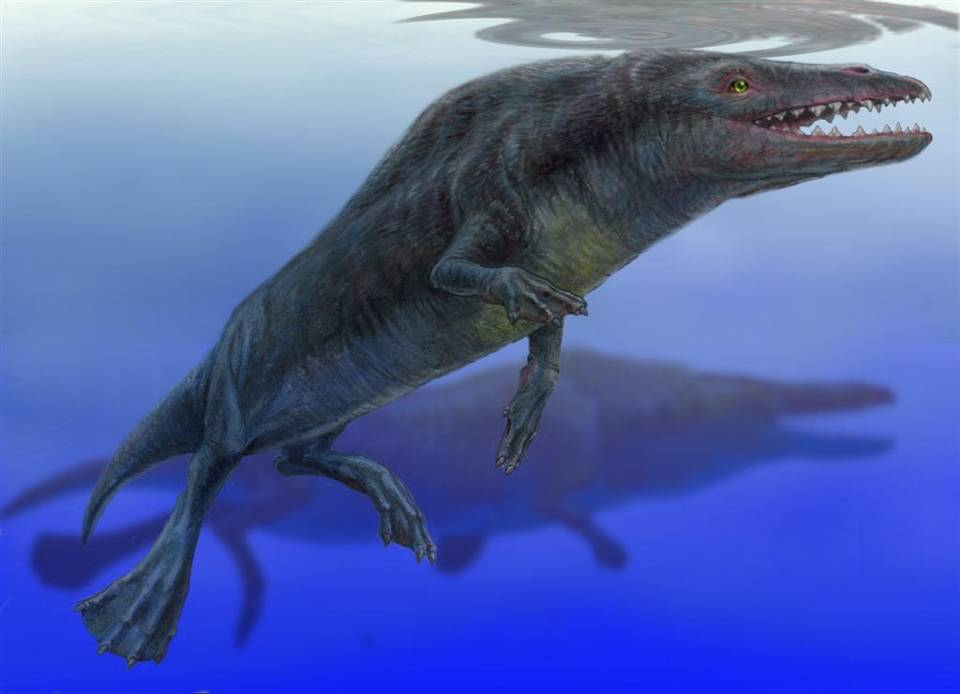
Drawing of Rodhocetus.

There were many genera, and some of these are very well known (e.g., Rodhocetus). Known protocetids had large fore- and hindlimbs that could support the body on land, and it is likely that they lived amphibiously: in the sea and on land. It is unclear at present whether protocetids had flukes (the horizontal tail fin of modern cetaceans). However, what is clear is that they are adapted even further to an aquatic life-style. In Rodhocetus, for example, the sacrum – a bone that in land-mammals is a fusion of five vertebrae that connects the pelvis with the rest of the vertebral column – was divided into loose vertebrae. However, the pelvis retain a sacroiliac joint. Furthermore, the nasal openings are now halfway up the snout; a first step towards the telescoped condition in modern whales. Their supposed amphibious nature is supported by the discovery of a pregnant Maiacetus, in which the fossilised fetus was positioned for a head-first delivery, suggesting that Maiacetus gave birth on land. The ungulate ancestry of these early whales is still underlined by characteristics like the presence of hooves at the ends of toes in Rodhocetus.

== Taxonomy ==
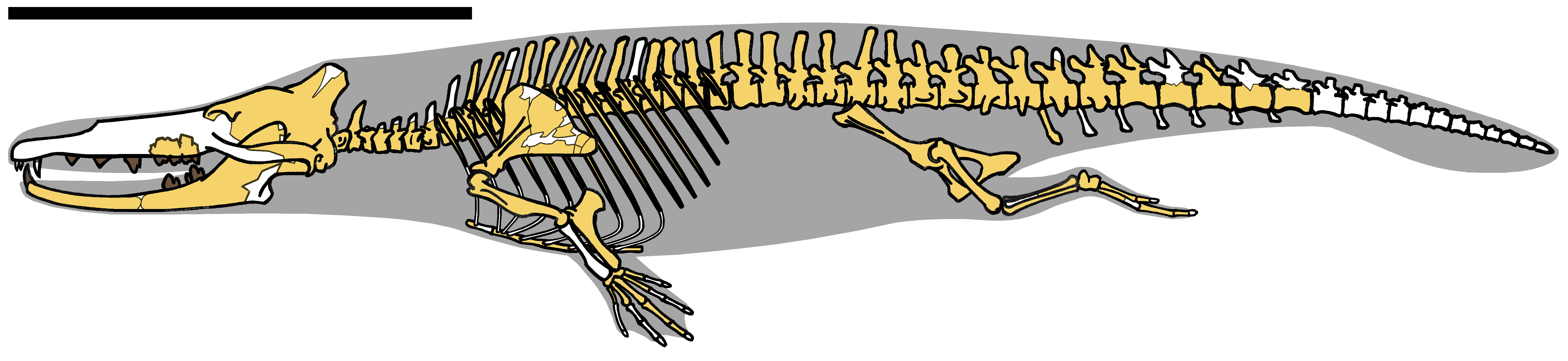
Skeletal drawing of Aegicetus.

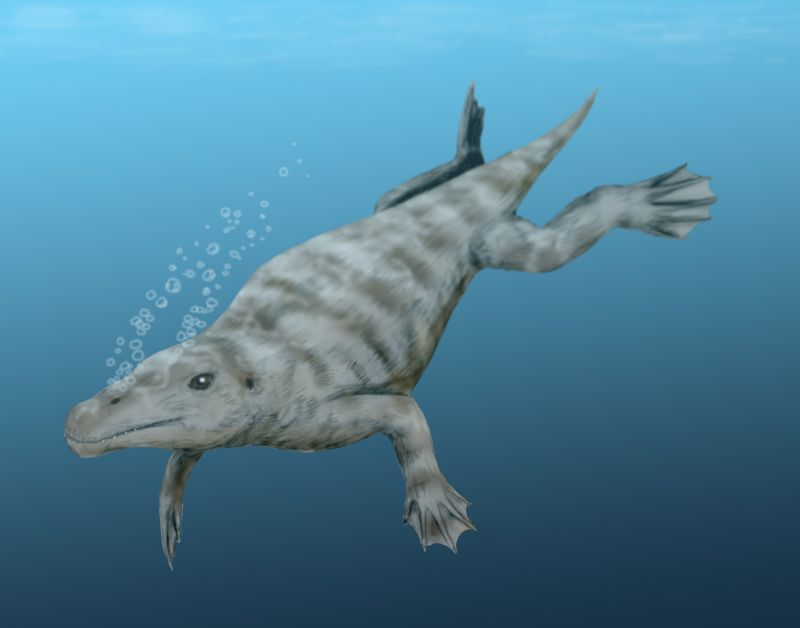
Drawing of Georgiacetus.

The protocetid subfamilies were proposed by Gingerich et al. 2005. They placed Makaracetus in its own subfamily (Makaracetinae) based on its unique adaptations for feeding (including only two incisors in each premaxilla). They then erected two subfamilies for the rest of the protocetids based on their degree of aquatic adaptation:

Protocetinae- Protocetines are Lutetian protocetids with generalized skulls retaining three incisors in the premaxilla and three molars in the maxilla. To the extent postcrania are known (primarily from Rodhocetus, and more recently Peregocetus), they possess a pelvis similar to those in land-living mammals, a sacrum articulated to the ilia and innominates and large hindlimbs used for foot-powered propulsion. Genera:

- Aegyptocetus
- Artiocetus
- Dhedacetus
- Gaviacetus
- Indocetus
- Kharodacetus
- Maiacetus
- Peregocetus
- Phiomicetus
- Protocetus
- Qaisracetus
- Rodhocetus
- Takracetus
- Togocetus

Georgiacetinae- Georgiacetines are Bartonian protocetids, considered transitional to the basilosaurids. Their skulls and dentition are similar to those of protocetines, but the pelvis in Georgiacetus and Aegicetus indicate a reduced sacroiliac joint, with no substantial articulation between backbone and innominates. Until recently, no hindlimb material was known for this subfamily, although the pelvic morphology seemed to hint at a tail-based rather than foot-based mode of aquatic locomotion. The discovery of Aegicetus supports this notion. Genera:

- Aegicetus
- Babiacetus
- Carolinacetus
- Crenatocetus
- Georgiacetus
- Natchitochia
- Pappocetus
- Tupelocetus
