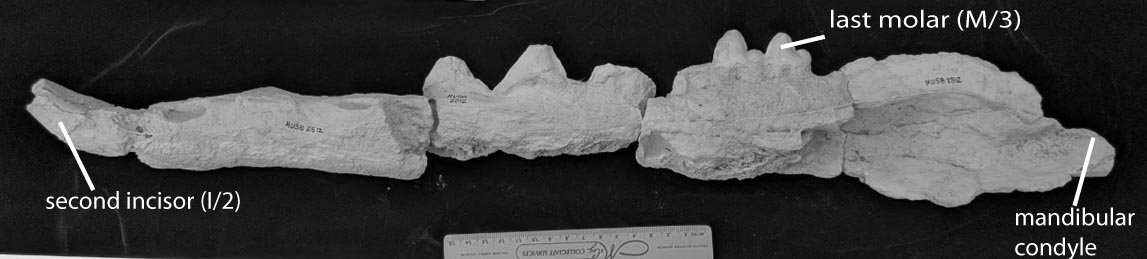
- lower jaw of Babiacetus

Scientific classification
- Kingdom: Animalia
- Phylum: Chordata
- Class: Mammalia
- Order: Artiodactyla
- Infraorder: Cetacea
- Family: †Protocetidae
- Subfamily: †Georgiacetinae
- Genus: †Babiacetus; Trivedy & Satsangi 1984

Species
- B. indicus Trivedy & Satsangi 1984; B. mishrai Bajpai & Thewissen 1998

= Babiacetus =

Babiacetus Temporal range: Middle Eocene, 47.8–40.4 Ma

Extinct protocetid early whale

Babiacetus is an extinct genus of early cetacean that lived during the late Lutetian middle Eocene of India (47.8 to 40.4 million years ago). It was named after its type locality, the Harudi Formation in the Babia Hills (23.5°N 68.8°E: paleocoordinates 5.9°N 61.8°E), Kutch District, Gujarat, India.

== Discovery ==
Babiacetus was named by Trivedy & Satsangi 1984 in an abstract based on the specimen's type (GSI 19647, left and right dentaries with cheek teeth). Gingerich and colleagues found a skull (GSP-UM 3005, much of a skull and lower jaws) while collecting a skeleton of a new species of Protosiren (Protosiren sattaensis) in the Drazinda Formation (30.8°N 70.5°E, paleocoordinates 16.9°N 67.1°E) in the Sulaiman Range of Punjab, Pakistan. Gingerich et al. 1995 described both the original find and their new specimen. Bajpai & Thewissen 1998 described B. mishrai from the specimen (RUSB 2512, a partial skull) collected in the Harudi Formation.

== Description ==
Babiacetus is one of the larger protocetids weighing about 830 kilograms (1,830 lb). Its hydrodynamic skull and pointed, anteroposteriorly (front-back) oriented incisors are typical of archaeocetes. A densely ossified auditory bulla and large mandibular canal indicate it was adapted for hearing in water. Babiacetus differs from pakicetids and ambulocetids (more primitive families) by the large mandibular foramen and a medially concave ascending ramus; distinct from remingtonocetids and basilosaurids (more derived families) by the single-cusped trigonid and talonid on the lower molars. Its long synostotic (fused) mandibular symphysis, which reaches as far back as P_{2}, distinguishes it from Pappocetus and Georgiacetus (other protocetids). Its auditory bulla is more narrow than Rodhocetus'. Babiacetus lacks the prominent molar protocone present in Indocetus. The anterior premolars are large.

The mandible is longer in B. indicus than in B. mishrai, and P_{1} is single-rooted in the former but double-rooted in the latter. The diastemata between P_{1} and P_{4} in B. indicus is absent in B. mishrai. B. indicus has larger cheek teeth and a larger M_{3}.

== Palaeobiology ==
The teeth of Babiacetus exhibit substantial spalling, suggesting that this cetacean fed on hard-bodied prey of relatively large size. To date, only cranial remains have been found, hence nothing is known of Babicetus' mode of locomotion or degree of aquatic adaptation.
