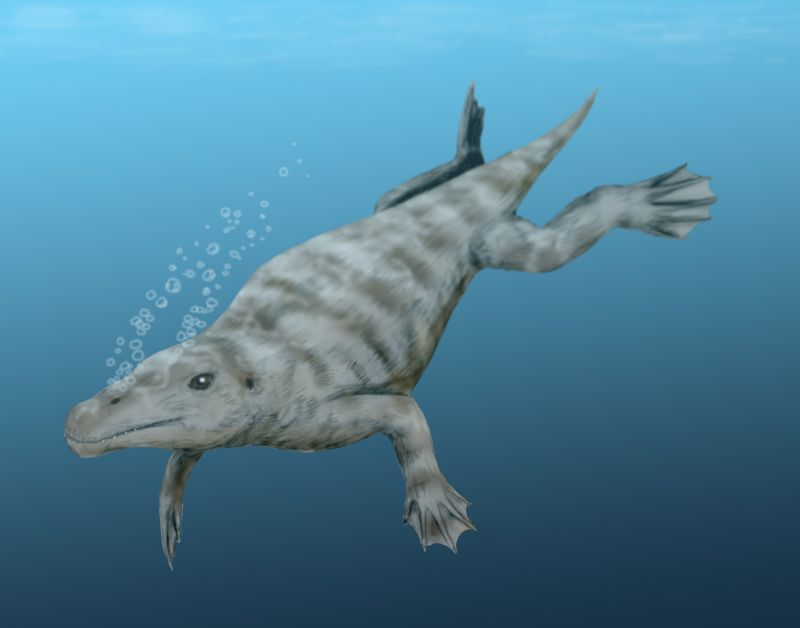

Scientific classification
- Kingdom: Animalia
- Phylum: Chordata
- Class: Mammalia
- Infraclass: Placentalia
- Order: Artiodactyla
- Infraorder: Cetacea
- Family: †Protocetidae
- Subfamily: †Georgiacetinae; Gingerich et al. 2005
- Genus: †Georgiacetus; Hulbert et al. 1998
- Species: †G. vogtlensis

Binomial name
- †Georgiacetus vogtlensis Hulbert et al. 1998

= Georgiacetus =

Georgiacetus Temporal range: Middle Eocene, 46–43 Ma

Extinct genus of mammals

Georgiacetus is an extinct genus of ancient whale known from the Eocene period of the United States. Fossils are known from Georgia, Alabama, and Mississippi and protocetid fossils from the right time frame, but not yet confirmed as Georgiacetus, have been found in Texas (Kellogg 1936) and South Carolina (Albright 1996).

Uhen 2008 created a new clade, Pelagiceti, for the common ancestor of Basilosauridae and all of its descendants, including Neoceti, the living cetaceans. He placed Georgiacetus near the base of this clade together with Eocetus and perhaps Babiacetus because of the assumed presence of a fluke and very compressed posterior caudal vertebrae in these genera.

Georgiacetus is an extinct protocetid (early whale) which lived about 40 million years ago and hunted the rich, Suwannee Current powered coastal sea which once covered the Southeastern United States. This was during the earliest Bartonian Stage of the Eocene Epoch (40.5 to 37.2 million years ago). Current research puts Georgiacetus as the link between the protocetids and modern whales, making the Georgia whale a scientifically important ancestor to all modern whales. An articulated and completed cast of the find is currently on display at the Georgia Southern University Museum in Statesboro, Georgia; Georgia Southern University also houses the actual 1983 Georgiacetus fossils and has the animal's fossilized hip bones on display.

== Discovery ==
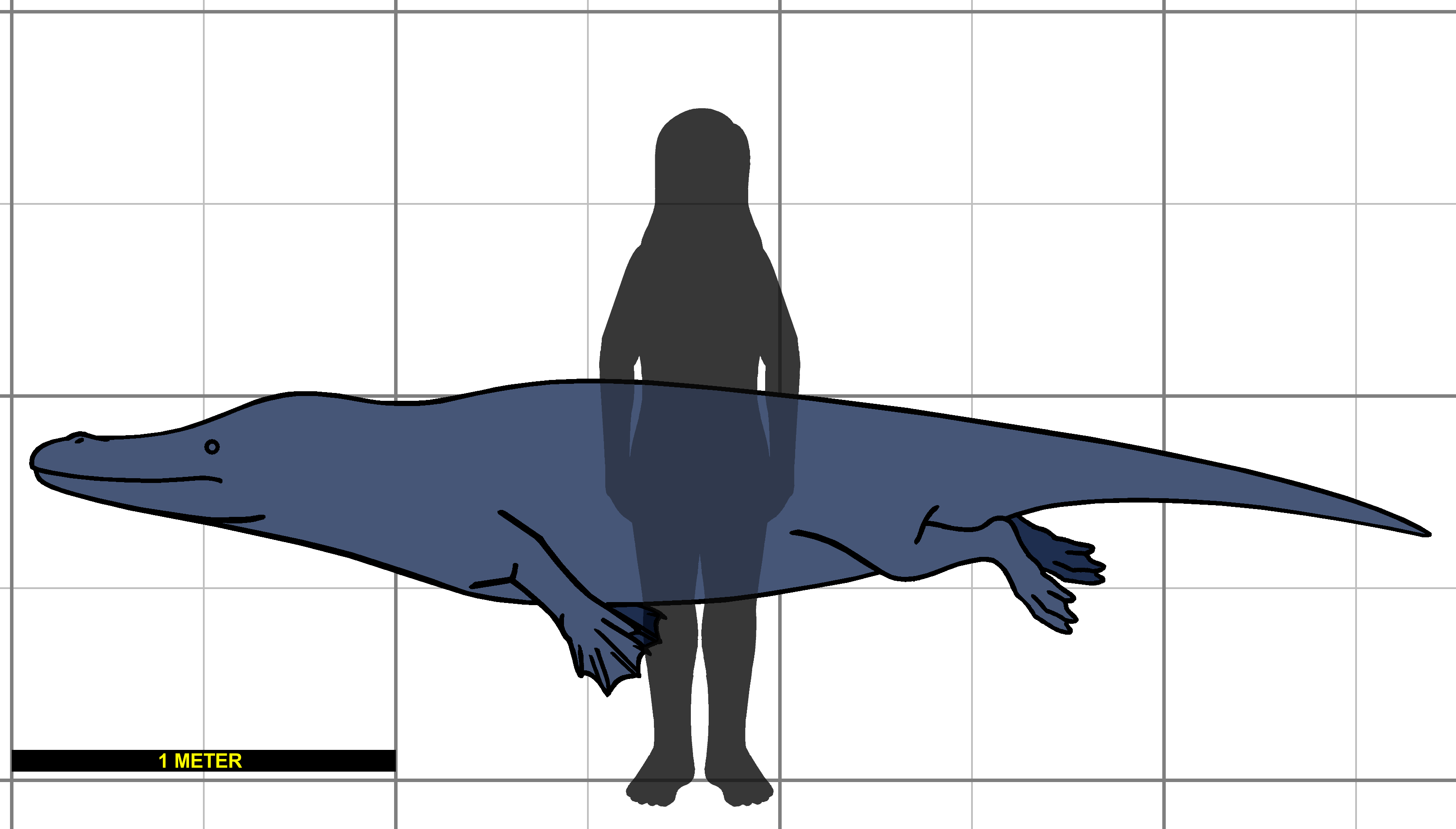
Image showing the size of Georgiacetus compared to a human

Georgiacetus was discovered in 1983 during the construction of the nuclear power plant Plant Vogtle in Burke County, Georgia (in the Lutetian Blue Bluff Formation, 33.1°N 81.8°W, paleocoordinates 33.7°N 70.3°W). The find consisted of three individuals all identified as belonging to the same species; two of the individuals were represented by isolated bones recovered separately which included a few vertebrae, ribs and tooth crowns.

The main find was discovered during the cutting of a drainage channel for the plant's River Water Intake Structure on the Savannah River at a depth of about 30 ft (9.1 m) below the surface. It was a 75%-80% complete individual consisting of more than 60 bones and teeth; including a well-preserved skull and mandible. Fortunately, Georgia Power halted construction activities in the area and assisted in the recovery effort. The main mass was collected from an area about 3.3 m^{2} (36 sq ft), they were not articulated. There was evidence of light scavenging with scratches on one rib but only ten shark's teeth were recovered with the find. There was no duplication of fossilized bones in the main mass so a single individual was represented. This was an adult animal with fully erupted and well-worn molars. There was no apparent cause of death. The main mass of bones were first reviewed in the field (1983) by geologist E. A. Shapiro of the Georgia Geologic Survey (which was "abolished" in 2004). On Shapiro's recommendation, Georgia Southern University was called in and Richard Petkewich and Gale Bishop led the effort to recover the specimen.

== Description ==
=== Cranium and dentition ===
Dr. Richard Hulbert, also with Georgia Southern University at that time, led the research team which described the find as a new genus and species in 1998. The skull is more than 30 in (760 mm) long, 12 in (300 mm) wide and about 24 in (610 mm) deep, fleshed out it would have been decidedly larger.

The structure of its inner ear bones confirms Georgiacetus as belonging with the whales; throughout their long history, all whales and their terrestrial ancestors have possessed an identifiable and unique inner ear bone structure.

It is hard to know the total length of the animal as no legs or tail vertebrae were found, but researchers estimate a length of at 10 to 20 ft (3.0 to 6.1 m) considering the head would have been nearly three feet long for a living animal.

Georgiacetus was equipped as an active predator capable of taking and processing large prey. There was a prominent crest at the top rear of the skull which would have anchored powerful jaw muscles. The front teeth were curved, banana-shaped (though in life most of the banana shape would have been deep in the jaw with just the tip exposed) and peg-like. These teeth were adapted to seize and hold struggling prey; moving back in the jaws there were deeply rooted triangular edged teeth for shearing, and further back were sharp molars for crushing. Large fish, birds or turtles could have been caught and processed into manageable chunks.

The tooth and skull arrangement shows a clear, direct relationship between the Basilosauridae family and Georgiacetus. Basilosaurids possessed teeth and a skull remarkably similar in function and structure, both have nostrils (blowholes) located halfway back on the snout, just in front of the eyes. The basilosaurid tooth arrangement appears as a more efficient and specialized version of the Georgiacetus arrangement. Georgiacetus predated the basilosaurids by nearly three million years; the Georgia Whale was very likely the source of the basilosaurids.

=== Postcranium ===
Uhen 2008 described new Georgiacetus material from Alabama and Mississippi. These finds included several tail vertebrae, teeth, and a partial mandible. The most important find was a single end-of-tail vertebra, one which would have occupied the very end of the vertebral column. This end-of-tail vertebra possessed two distinct, muscle supporting flanges. It did not show that simplified, compressed end-of-tail arrangement seen in both modern whales and Basilosaurus. It did not show any fluke supporting adaptations. This single vertebra showed that Georgiacetus apparently lacked a fluke and likely swam with its hind legs.

Georgiacetus had a tail and lacked the fluke present in slightly younger fossils. It probably swam using its hindlimbs by wiggling its hips and moving its trunk up and down, a locomotor behaviour abandoned by modern whales. Whales evolved in South Asia, and it was previously thought that the fluke helped early whales spread across Earth from there, so Georgiacetus's presence in America and its legs and tail contradicts this hypothesis.

Uhen 2008 also established the clade Pelagiceti to show the relationship between Georgiacetus, the basilosaurids and modern whales. This clade begins just after Georgiacetus, includes the basilosaurids, baleen and toothed whales. This shows that Georgiacetus led to the basilosaurids, which in turn led to modern whales.

The right and left hip bones of Georgiacetus were recovered though no hind leg or tail material was preserved. The hip bones were relatively large and showed well developed sockets. This indicates that Georgiacetus had well developed hind legs. Because the hip bones were so much larger than those known from Basilosaurus, and Basilosaurus was a dramatically larger animal than Georgiacetus, it was cautiously assumed that the hind legs of Georgiacetus were much larger, relative to body size, than the tiny hind legs of Basilosaurus. Yet the hip bones were not fused to the spine, (neither are those of Basilosaurus) which suggests that the Georgia whale probably could not support its own weight out of the water.

== Paleoenvironment ==
Global sea levels were about 130 ft (40 m) higher than modern levels when these whales lived. The fossils were discovered 93 mi (150 km) inland from the modern coastline. The invertebrate fossils recovered along with the main mass of bones showed that the whale died well off-shore in a shallow, open water environment approximately 30 mi (48 km) from the coastline (today Georgia's Fall Line). These invertebrate fossils also allowed accurate dating of the remains.

== Dispersal into North America ==
Georgiacetus was held as the earliest North American whale until Geisler, Sanders & Luo 2005 published a paper on Carolinacetus, a slightly older, more primitive whale than Georgiacetus, based on a partial skull, mandible, several teeth, ribs and vertebra. An important find in itself, one of the interesting questions the authors asked was how whales got to North America.

Whales emerged about 52 million years ago in the Tethys Ocean (between present-day India and Asia). It was a warm, fertile shallow sea very much like the one which covered southeastern United States 40 million years ago when whales (Georgiacetus & Carolinacetus) were already present in America. There are two schools of thought on how they got there: one involves a direct, deep-water Atlantic crossing, the other involves a polar route northwards up the European coastline, across to Greenland, and southward along the North American coastline. This polar route would not have been a cold water trip as the climate was much warmer then and Greenland was very likely green. Both routes would require long deep-water crossings. Also, as sea levels were much higher at that time, the journey would be longer than it is today.

Whichever route taken, the fact that the journey occurred shows that by the time Carolinacetus and Georgiacetus lived, whales (which did not yet possess flukes) were already capable of extended deep-water activity.
