= Eocetus =

Eocetus Temporal range: Late Eocene, 40.4–37.2 Ma

Scientific classification
- Kingdom: Animalia
- Phylum: Chordata
- Class: Mammalia
- Order: Artiodactyla
- Infraorder: Cetacea
- Family: †Protocetidae
- Subfamily: †Georgiacetinae
- Genus: †Eocetus; Fraas, 1904

Type species
- †Eocetus schweinfurthi Fraas 1904a

Other species
- †E. drazindai (Gingerich et al. 1997)

Synonyms
- Basilosaurus drazindai (Gingerich et al. 1997) [possibly also a synonym of Basiloterus]; "Mesocetus" schweinfurthi Fraas 1904a

Extinct protocetid early whale

Eocetus (from Ancient Greek ἠώς (ēṓs), meaning "dawn", and Latin cetus, meaning "whale", and thus, "dawn whale") is an extinct protocetid early whale known from the early-late Eocene (Bartonian, 40.4 to 37.2 million years ago) Giushi Formation in Gebel Mokattam, (30.0°N 31.3°E, paleocoordinates 24.9°N 26.8°E) outside Cairo, Egypt. Fossil remains have also been discovered in the Aridal Formation of the Sahara Desert in southwestern Morocco.

The type specimen was first named by Fraas as Mesocetus schweinfurthi. However, the name Mesocetus was previously used causing a change to the species name to Eocetus schweinfurthi. Since the genus was first described in the early 20th century, several other specimens, mostly isolated vertebrae, have been attributed to Eocetus, but the taxonomic status of these widely distributed specimens remain disputed.

== Discovery and taxonomy ==
Fraas 1904a described "Mesocetus schweinfurthi" based on a dorsoventrally compressed skull with only I^{2} in situ, a specimen supposedly originating from a 40 Ma Tethyan deposit at Mokattam. Fraas also referred two isolated teeth, P^{4} and M^{1}, to the skull and the most important of his specimens is not the deformed skull, but the upper molar which retains three roots and a worn but well-developed protocone. Georg August Schweinfurth, a German palaeontologist who explored Mokattam in the 1880s, mentioned the quarriers there very eagerly offered "shark teeth" to tourists and that scientists and fossil collectors regularly bought their specimens from this source. There is reason to assume that Fraas were among them and that at least his two isolated teeth were described without direct knowledge of their original locality and stratigraphic context. Notwithstanding that the stratigraphic information supplied by Fraas and his contemporaries can be difficult to interpret, the geology of Egypt is well studied, and both the skull and the accompanying teeth are most likely Bartonian in age—older and significantly more primitive than any other cetacean specimen known from Egypt at that time. Fraas soon discovered that the name "Mesocetus" was already occupied, and changed the name of his "Urform Protocetus" to Eocetus.

Fraas also attributed two isolated vertebrae to his new genus, both of which Uhen 1998 moved to Basilosaurus drazindai. A holotype, described by Stromer 1903 as Zeuglodon macrospondylus, was discovered in Egypt. It is later used for comparison for other vertebrae. Stromer 1908 attributed two other vertebrae from Mokattam to Eocetus. These two vertebrae were lost for many years until Uhen 1999 described two bones that he discovered in a museum in Germany and appeared to fit Stromer's description. Uhen based his assignment of his own North American genus (see below) to Eocetus on the similarities to Stromer's vertebrae.

=== Previously assigned specimens and taxa ===
Uhen 1999 described a new species, Eocetus wardii, from the late Lutetian (~42 Ma) of North Carolina based on more complete material: a partial skull, a few thoracic, lumbar and caudal vertebrae, ribs and an innominate fragment. Uhen initially argued that the innominate would have been sufficiently large to support a weight-bearing hind limb—suggesting the animal was a protocetid, a group of more primitive archaeocetes—but also has anatomical features in common with basilosaurids—more derived and fully aquatic archaeocetes. Uhen also noted that the composition of the ribs and vertebrae is different from that of other archaeocetes and sirenians: a core of light trabecular bone is surrounded by layers of dense cortical bone. Due to this mosaic of protocetid and basilosaurid features, Geisler, Sanders & Luo 2005 regarded Uhen's specimen as unique among North American archaeocetes and an interesting find, but questioned the validity of Uhen's attribution (including that of Stromer's two vertebrae). This suspicion was confirmed by Gol'din & Zvonok 2013, who reassigned E. wardii remains to the genus Basilotritus (and hence Basilosauridae), while Gol'din have concluded that the original interpretation of its innominate were incorrect, and that the hips could have been more reduced and Basilosaurus-like than Uhen first thought.

Uhen & Berndt 2008 described another partial lumbar vertebra discovered in Rohrdorf, Bavaria, Germany, in 2003. They attributed it to Eocetus sp.—the first confirmed protocetid from Europe—and argued that this specimen further supports the hypothesis that protocetids were aquatic to the extent that they managed to spread over the world.

Two vertebrae, a thoracic and a lumbar, discovered on a riverbed in Virginia in 2009 were referred to "Eocetus" wardi by Weems et al. 2011.

Uhen et al. 2011 described a still unnamed Bartonian protocetid from Peru based on the posterior portion of a skull, seven partial vertebrae, and ribs from and adult individual. Uhen et al. considered this specimen closely related to Eocetus based on vertebral morphology.

Goldin, Zvonok & Krakhmalnaya 2012 described two vertebra, a thoracic and a lumbar, from a subadult individual found in Ukraine. They considered them comparable to those Uhen described in 1999 and attributed their specimen to "E." wardii.
