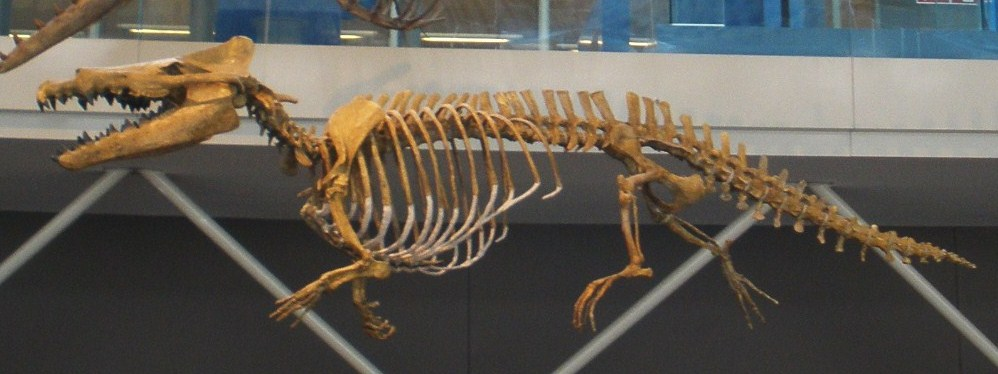
- Maiacetus skeleton cast at Musee d'Histoire Naturelle, Brussels

Scientific classification
- Kingdom: Animalia
- Phylum: Chordata
- Class: Mammalia
- Order: Artiodactyla
- Infraorder: Cetacea
- Family: †Protocetidae
- Subfamily: †Protocetinae
- Genus: †Maiacetus; Gingerich et al., 2009

Species
- M. inuus Gingerich et al., 2009 (type)

= Maiacetus =

Maiacetus Temporal range: Middle Eocene, 47.5 Ma

Genus of mammals

Maiacetus ("mother whale") is a genus of early cetacean from the Eocene-aged Habib Rahi Formation of Pakistan.

== Paleobiology ==
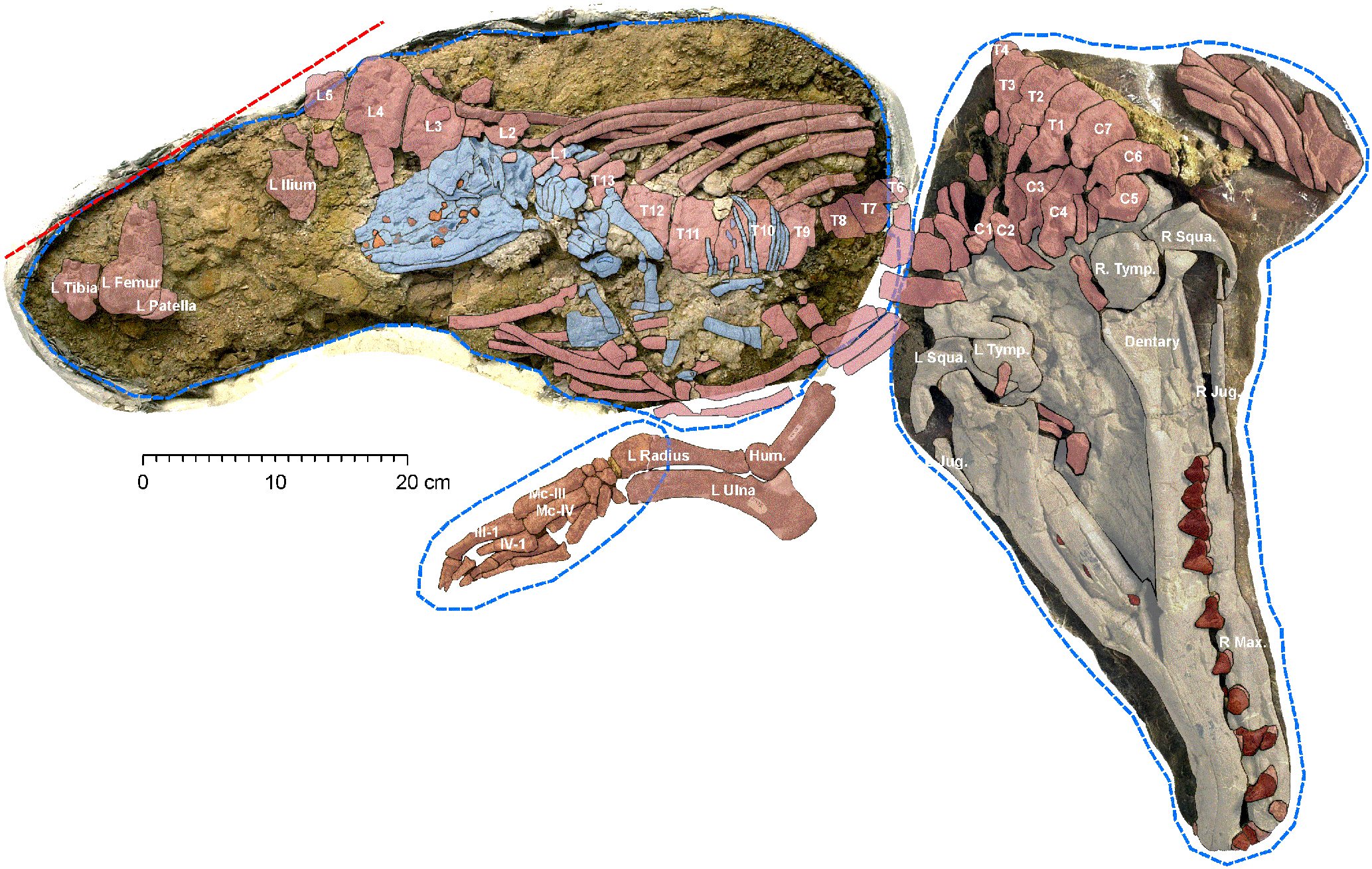
Adult female and fetal (in blue) Maiacetus

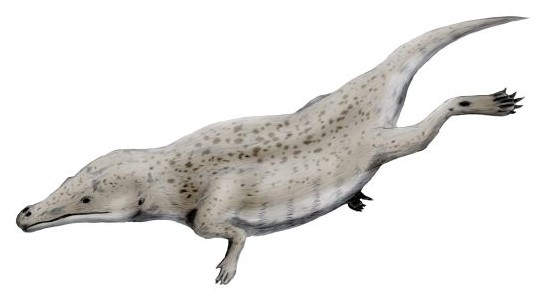
Life restoration

The genus contains a single species, Maiacetus inuus, first described in 2009 on the basis of two specimens, including a specimen which has been interpreted as a pregnant female and her fetus. This represents the first description of a fetal skeleton of an archaeocete. The position of the fetus (head-first) suggests that the animal gave birth on land. Modern whales generally give birth tail first, while land mammals give birth head first. That the Maiacetus should give birth on land is not so implausible because this whale is semiaquatic or amphibious. Maiacetus represents the transition of land mammals back to the oceans where these animals were living on the land-sea interface and going back and forth.

However, Hans Thewissen, discoverer of Ambulocetus, has questioned these conclusions, suggesting that the smaller skeleton could be a partially digested meal. Even if the small skeleton is a fetus, Thewissen writes that it may not have been preserved in its normal in-vivo position. Authors pointed out in the original article, however, that the fetal skull has no tooth marks.

The hip bones were strong, suggesting that Maiacetus was able to walk on land; however, the short legs and flat digits would've made walking difficult. Looking at the flattened finger and toe bones, scientists have come to the conclusion that Maiacetus had webbed feet and was most likely amphibious. The teeth of the preserved fossils show similarity to the teeth of Basilosaurus, another genus of prehistoric cetaceans. The incisors are cone-like, linking Maiacetus to modern toothed whales and other extinct cetaceans. The middle ear bones are also similar to those of Basilosaurus and modern whales.

This species is medium-sized with a skeleton 2.6 metres (8.5 ft) in length and an estimated weight of 280 to 390 kilograms (620 to 860 lb). Males are slightly larger than females; of the two adult skeletons found, the one interpreted as male was about 12% larger than the one interpreted as female.

== See also ==
- Evolution of cetaceans
