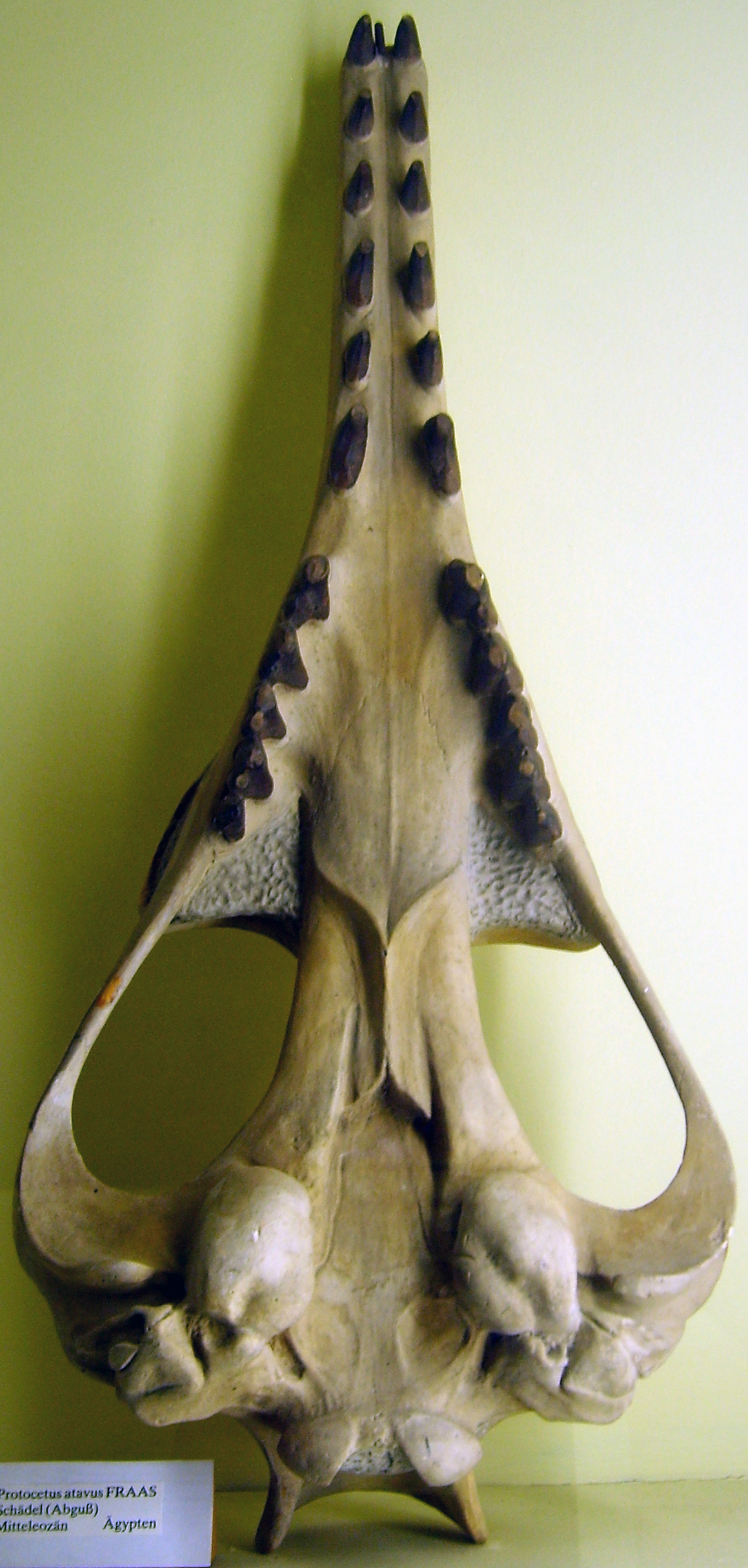
- Underside of a skull cast at the Museum für Naturkunde, Berlin

Scientific classification
- Kingdom: Animalia
- Phylum: Chordata
- Class: Mammalia
- Order: Artiodactyla
- Infraorder: Cetacea
- Family: †Protocetidae
- Genus: †Protocetus; Fraas 1904
- Species: †P. atavus

Binomial name
- †Protocetus atavus Fraas 1904

= Protocetus =

Protocetus Temporal range: Middle Eocene, 45–43.5 Ma

Species of mammal (fossil)

Protocetus atavus ("first whale") is an extinct species of primitive cetacean from Egypt. It lived during the middle Eocene period 45 million years ago. The first discovered protocetid, Protocetus atavus was described by Fraas 1904 based on a cranium and a number of associated vertebrae and ribs found in middle Lutetian Tethyan marine limestone from the Mokattam Formation at Gebel Mokattam near Cairo, Egypt.

== Description ==
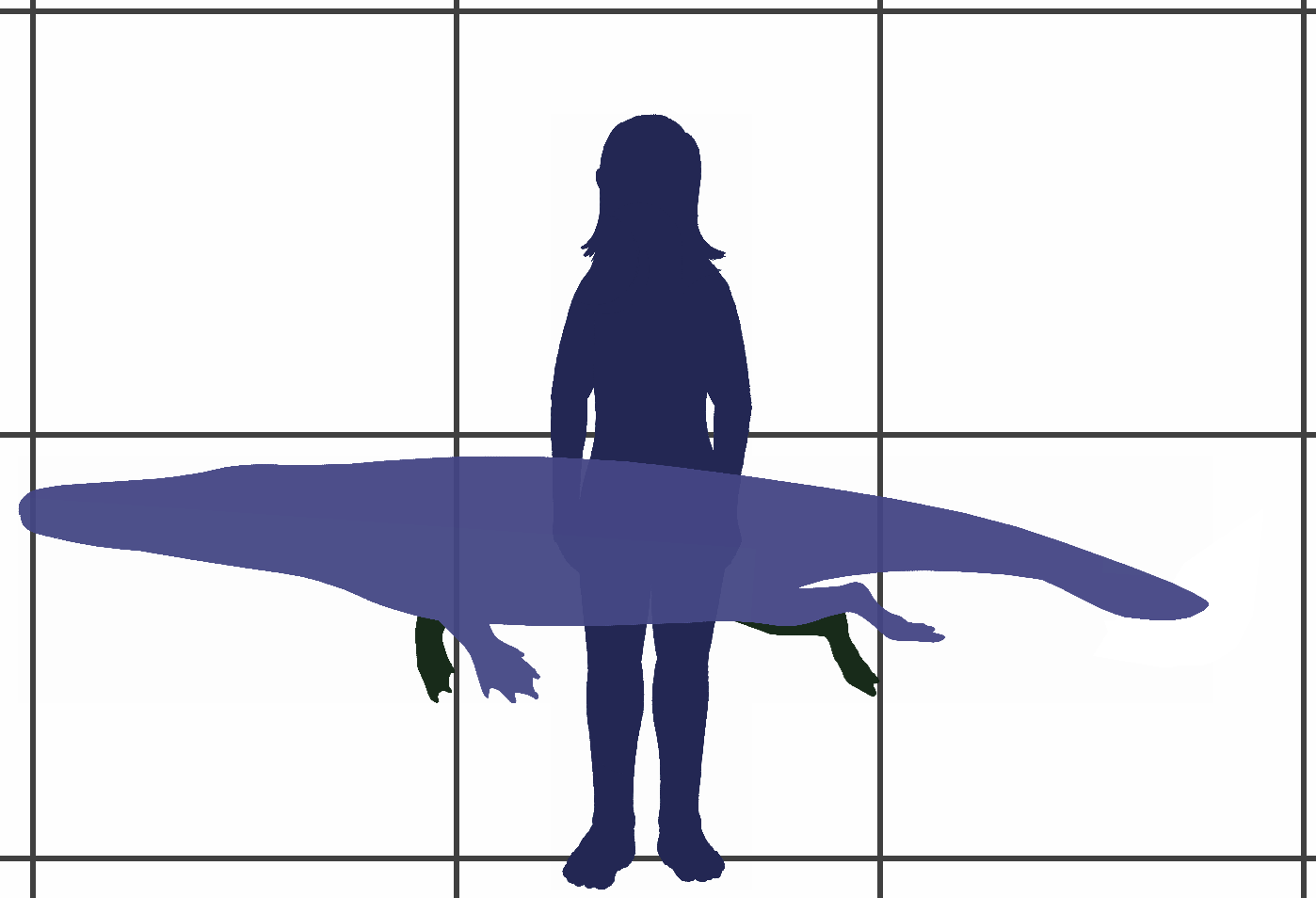
Size of Protocetus compared to a human.

Protocetus are believed to have had a streamlined, whale-like body around 2.5 metres (8.2 ft) long, but was probably primitive in some respects.

Many protocetids (like Maiacetus, Rodhocetus) possessed well developed innominates and hind limbs, often attached to the backbone with a sacrum. Protocetus are known to have had at least one sacral vertebrate, and likely possessed hind limbs and webbed toes. Despite previous proposals to the contrary, the current general consensus is that Protocetus and other protocetids lacked tail flukes.

The head of Protocetus measured about 0.6 meters long. The jaws were long and lined with sharp teeth. While it did not have a true blowhole, the nostrils were placed further back on the head than in most land mammals. Unlike the more primitive Pakicetus, the structure of the ears suggests that Protocetus was able to hear properly underwater, although it is unlikely that it could echolocate. Similarly, it retained sufficient olfactory apparatus to have a good sense of smell, although it probably relied more on its eyesight to find prey.

=== Skull ===
Recent high-resolution CT scans of the holotype skull of Protocetus atavus (SMNS-P-11084) have provided the first detailed reconstruction of its endocranial anatomy, offering significant insights into the evolution of sensory systems in early cetaceans. The study revealed that Protocetus had a relatively high encephalization quotient (EQ) compared to other middle Eocene cetaceans such as Rodhocetus and Remingtonocetus, suggesting an earlier onset of brain enlargement than previously assumed in whale evolution. Notably, the olfactory bulbs and tracts were well-developed, comprising up to 3.8% of the endocast volume, a value comparable to that of some terrestrial mammals. The anatomy of the nasal cavity, including the dorsal nasal meatus and vomeronasal groove, further supports the interpretation that Protocetus retained functional airborne olfaction. These findings challenge the long-held view that olfactory capabilities regressed early in cetacean evolution and suggest that the reduction of olfactory structures may have occurred later, potentially only after the emergence of fully aquatic forms like basilosaurids.

== See also ==
- Evolution of cetaceans
