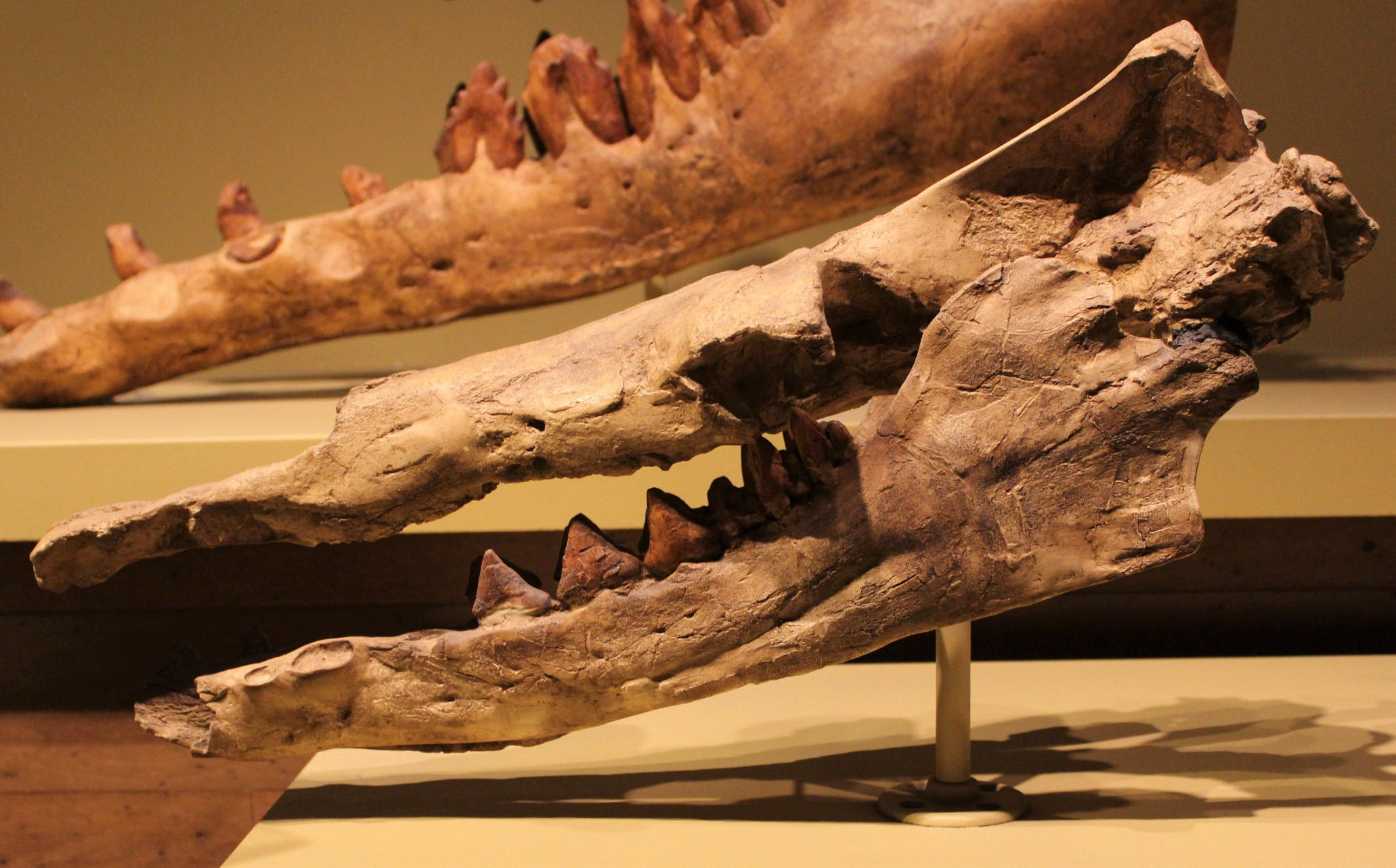
- Skull of Rodhocetus

Scientific classification
- Kingdom: Animalia
- Phylum: Chordata
- Class: Mammalia
- Order: Artiodactyla
- Infraorder: Cetacea
- Family: †Protocetidae
- Subfamily: †Protocetinae
- Genus: †Rodhocetus; Gingerich et al. 1994

Species
- †R. kasrani (type) Gingerich et al. 1994; †R. balochistanensis Gingerich et al. 2001

= Rodhocetus =

Rodhocetus Temporal range: Eocene (Lutetian), 47–46 Ma

Genus of mammals

Rodhocetus (from Rodho, the geological anticline at the type locality, and cetus, Latin for whale) is an extinct genus of protocetid early whale known from the Lutetian of Pakistan. The best-known protocetid, Rodhocetus is known from two partial skeletons that taken together give a complete image of an Eocene whale that had short limbs with long hands and feet that were probably webbed and a sacrum that was immobile with four partially fused sacral vertebrae. It is one of several extinct whale genera that possess land mammal characteristics, thus demonstrating the evolutionary transition from land to sea.

== Description ==
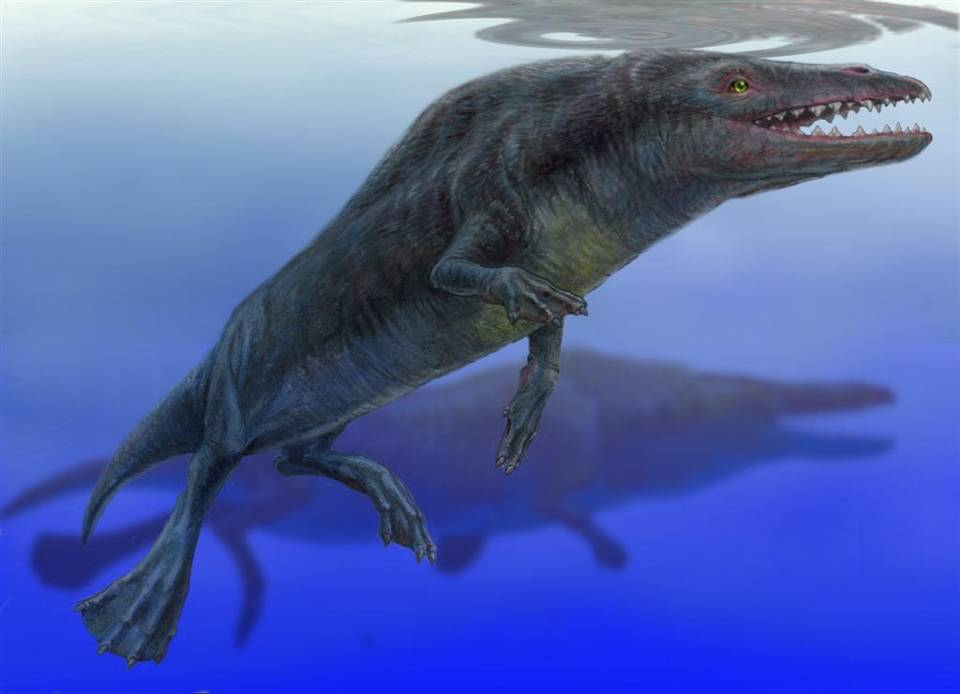
An artist's rendering of Rodhocetus

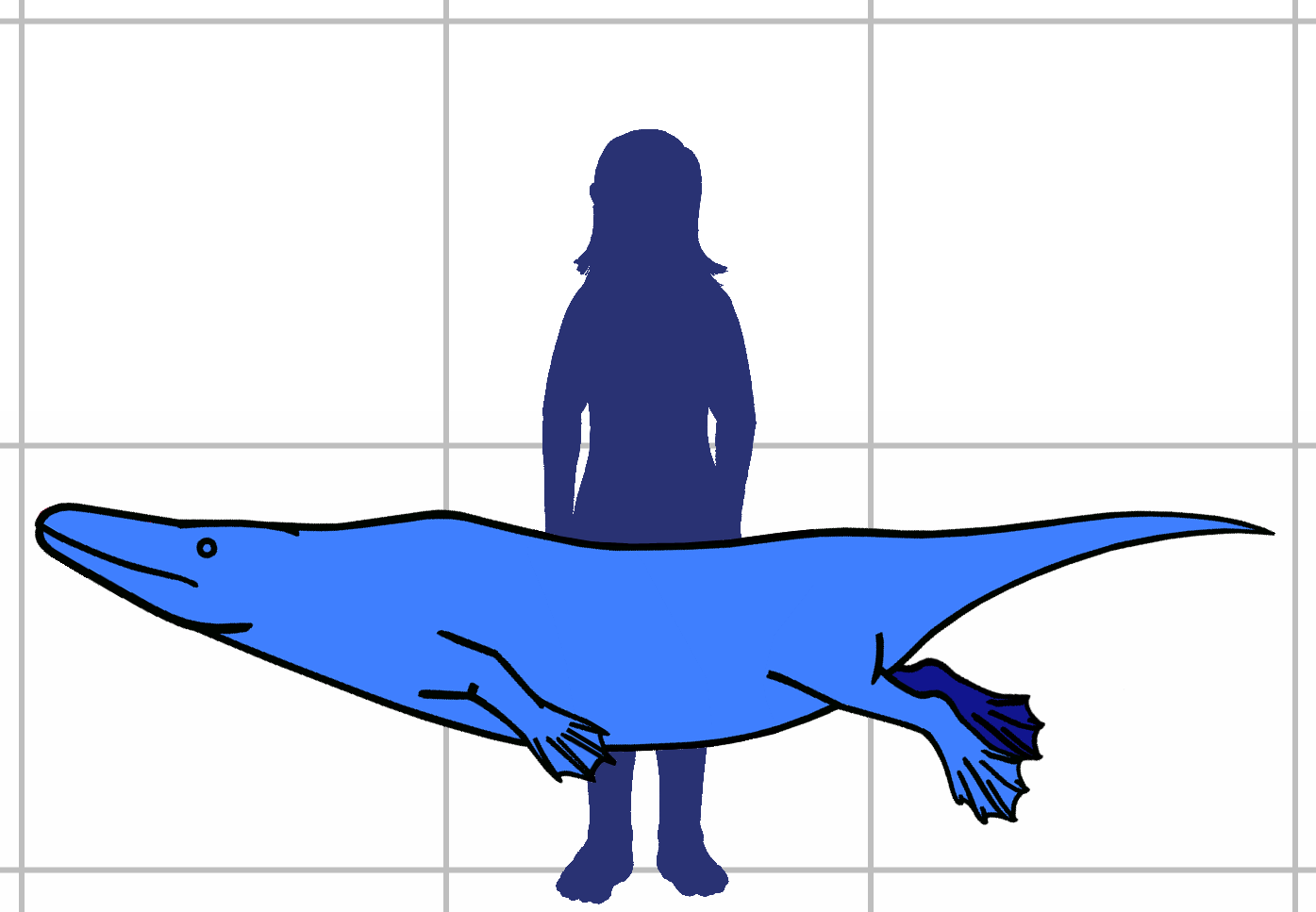
Size of Rodhocetus relative to a human

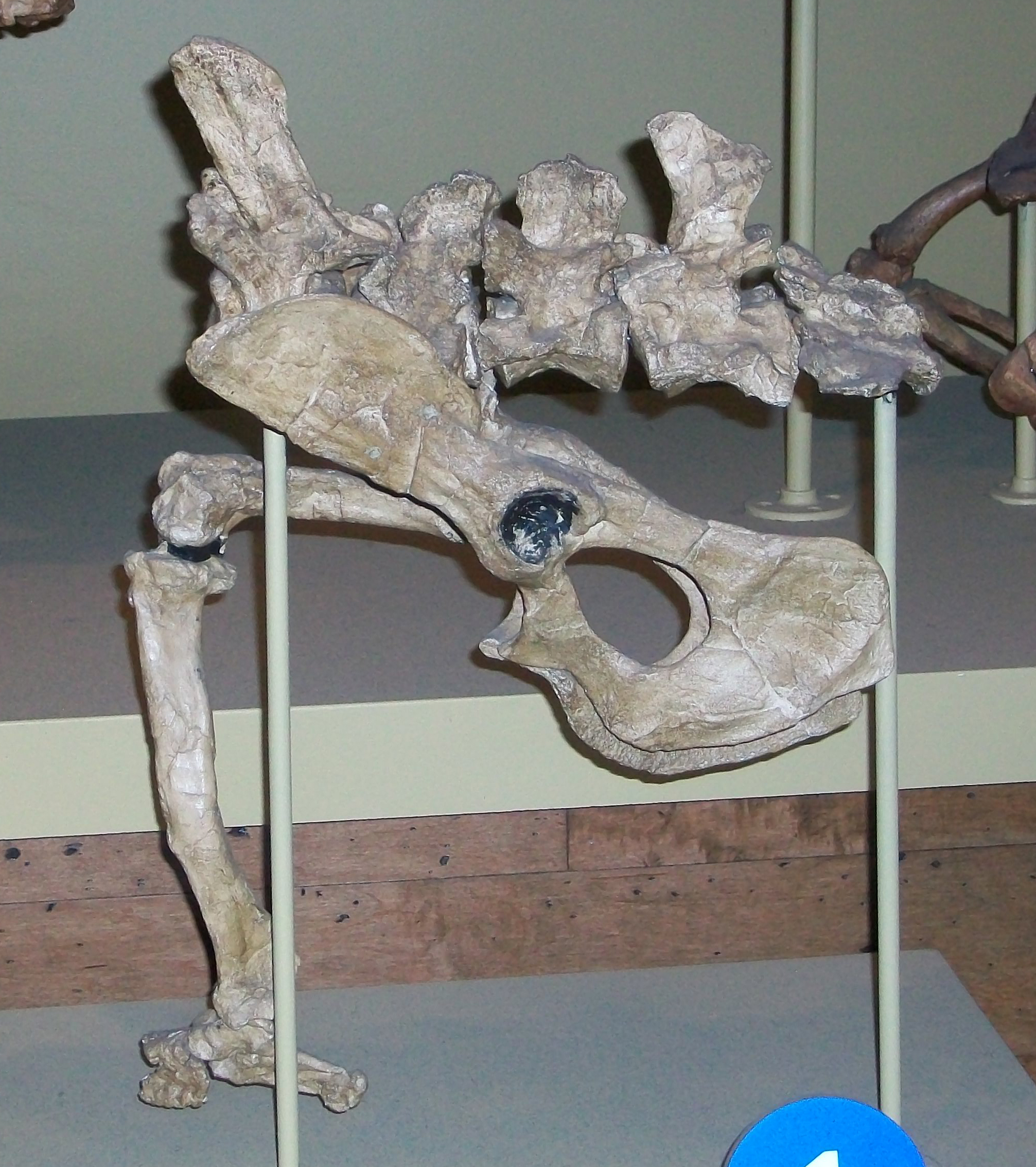
Pelvis, vertebrae, and hind limb of Rodhocetus

Rodhocetus was a small whale measuring 2–3 m (6.6–9.8 ft) long. Throughout the 1990s, a close relationship between cetaceans and mesonychians, an extinct group of cursorial, wolf-like ungulates, was generally accepted based on morphological analyses. In the late 1990s, however, cladistic analyses based on molecular data clearly placed Cetacea within the Artiodactyla near the hippopotamus. One of the diagnostic characteristics of artiodactyls is the double-pulley astragalus (ankle bone), and palaeontologists, unconvinced by the data from the labs, set themselves out to find archaeocete single-pulley heel bones. Hind legs from three archaeocete species were recovered within a few years, among them those of Rodhocetus balochistanensis, and all three had double-pulley heel bones, thus settling the cladistic controversy.

Through a principal components analysis Gingerich 2003 demonstrated that Rodhocetus had trunk and limb proportions similar to the Russian desman, a foot-powered swimmer using its tail mainly as a rudder. From this Gingerich concluded that Rodhocetus was swimming mostly at the surface by alternate strokes of its hind feet, and that it was insulated by fur rather than blubber, as are Dorudon and modern cetaceans, which made it buoyant and incapable of deep diving.

=== R. kasrani ===
The holotype of R. kasrani, GSP-UM 3012 found in 1992, was described by Gingerich et al. 1994: a cranium with two dentaries, most of the vertebral column as far as the anterior tail (C2–C7; T1–13; L1–6, S1–4, Ca1–4), most ribs, parts of the sternum, both hip bones, and a left femur. Gingerich et al. 1994 referred a specimen collected in 1981, GSP-UM 1852 two dentaries with teeth, to R. kasrani. The body mass of the holotype has been estimated between 340 and 590 kg (750 and 1,300 lb) based on different techniques.

Derived traits in R. kasrani, relative to older archaeocetes such as Pakicetus, include high-crowned cheek teeth, larger auditory bullae, larger mandibular foramen, and mandibular canals. The higher neural spines and shorter femur (60–70%) distinguish Rodhocetus from the more primitive Ambulocetus. The convex posterior surface of the exoccipital, shorter cervical vertebrae, and unfused sacral vertebrae distinguishes R. kasrani from Indocetus. In contrast to later archaeocetes such as Protocetus and later cetaceans, Rodhocetus retains external nares above upper canines, high neural spines on anterior thoracic vertebrae, and four sacral vertebrae with sacroiliac joints similar to those in land-mammals (suggesting a hip joint that could support the body weight.)

Several cranial features identifies R. kasrani as an archaeocete: both the premaxillae and the dentaries are elongated, the frontal shield is wide, and the nuchal crest is high. The auditory bullae are large and dense but, there are no associated pterygoid fossae or air sinuses. The mandibular foramina are large with a pan bone 90 mm (3.5 in) long and 65 mm (2.6 in) high.

The specific name kasrani comes from Qaisrani, the Baloch tribe inhabiting the type locality. The protocetid Qaisracetus is also named after them.

=== R. balochistanensis ===
The fossil remains of R. balochistanensis were found in eastern Balochistan, Pakistan, in 2001 by Philip Gingerich. Dating from about 47 million years ago, they are one of a series of recent discoveries, including the pakicetids, which have thrown considerable light on the previously mysterious evolutionary origin of whales.

The holotype of Rodhocetus balochistanensis, GSP-UM 3485, is:

- A weathered braincase found at the surface next to a partial dentary with an unfused mandibular symphysis, a characteristic of protocetids.
- Large parts of the axial skeleton including cervical, thoracic and proximal caudal vertebrae, but excluding sacral vertebrae.
- Forelimb material including the left distal humerus, radius and ulna, and two virtually complete hand skeletons including all carpal bones, unfused and lacking an os centrale, and phalanges.
- Parts of the pelvis including an acetabular rim.
- Hind limb material includes the right femur, patella, tibia, and possible partial fibula; two virtually complete foot skeletons include tarsal and metatarsal bones and phalanges. The astragalus (heel bone) is characteristic of artiodactyls with a deep tibial trochlea restricting lateral movements and a large calcaneal tuber (posterior part of heel bone) providing leverage for powerful extension. The metatarsals and phalanges are very long and thin and can not have been weight-bearing, suggesting that Rodhocetus was predominantly aquatic and on land must have walked on the plantar surface of the tarsals. The shape of the metatarsal and phalanges reveal that these bones could be tightly compressed during flexion and widely separated during extension.

The five-fingered hand of R. balochistanensis is mesaxonic (i.e. has a central digit) with three weight-bearing central digits equipped with nail-like hooves, flanked by two more slender digits lacking hooves (distal phalanges preserved on first, second, and fourth digits). The four-toed foot is paraxonic (i.e. central axis passes between the two central digits), with all four digits ending in pointed nails (distal phalanges preserved on second and third digits).

With an estimated body weight of 450 kg (990 lb), R. balochistanensis was 13% smaller than R. kasrani (590 kg (1,300 lb)), but its femur is larger.

== See also ==
- Evolution of cetaceans
