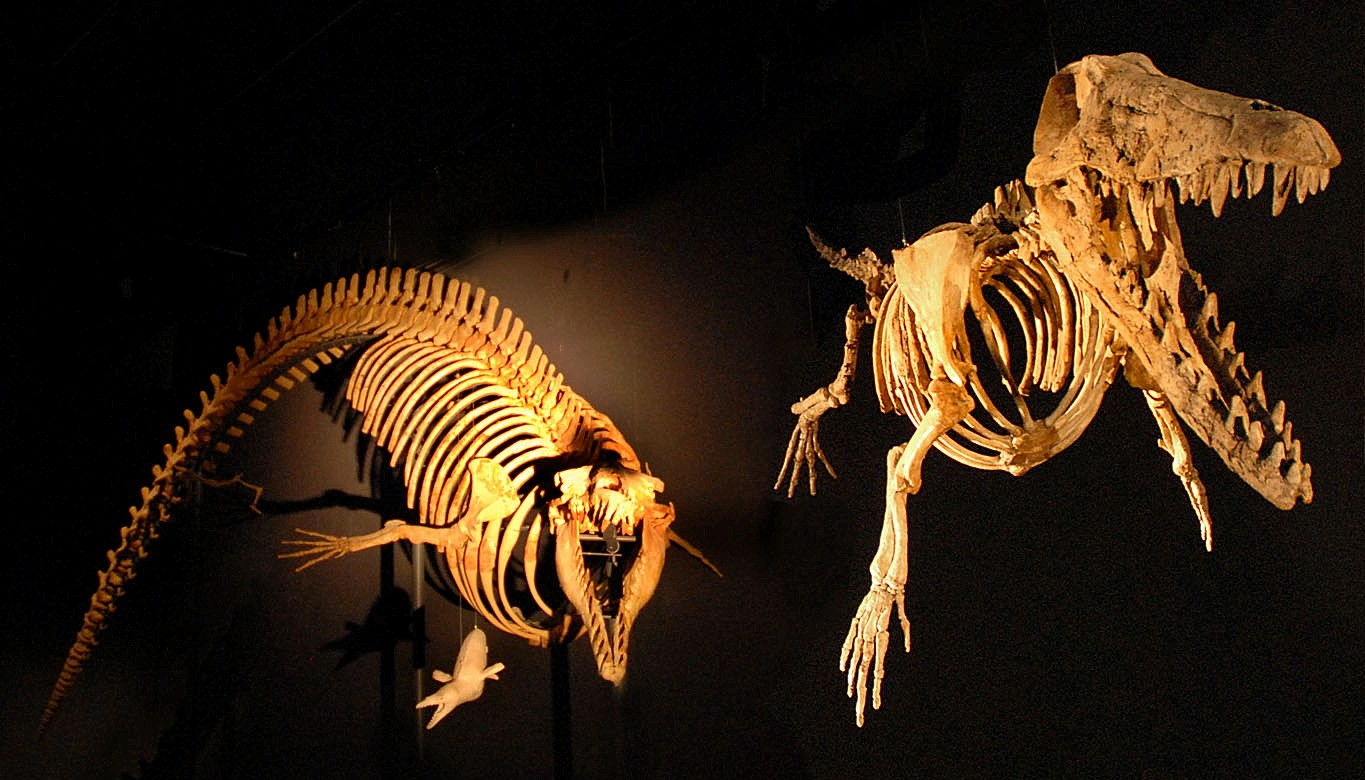
- Cynthiacetus and Ambulocetus skeletons

Scientific classification (obsolete)
- Kingdom: Animalia
- Phylum: Chordata
- Class: Mammalia
- Infraclass: Placentalia
- Order: Artiodactyla
- Infraorder: Cetacea
- (unranked): †Archaeoceti; Flower, 1883

Families and clades
- See text

= Archaeoceti =

Archaeoceti Temporal range: 54–23 Ma

Obsolete and paraphyletic group of primitive cetaceans

Archaeoceti ("ancient whales"), or Zeuglodontes in older literature, is an obsolete paraphyletic group of primitive cetaceans that lived from the Early Eocene to the late Oligocene (50 to 23 million years ago). Representing the earliest cetacean radiation, they include the initial semi-aquatic stages in cetacean evolution, thus are the ancestors of both modern cetacean suborders, Mysticeti and Odontoceti. This initial diversification occurred in the shallow waters that separated India and Asia 53 to 45 mya, resulting in some 30 species adapted to a fully oceanic life. Echolocation and filter-feeding evolved during a second radiation 36 to 35 mya.

All archaeocetes from the Ypresian (56–47.8 mya) and most from the Lutetian (47.8–41.3 mya) are known exclusively from Indo-Pakistan, but Bartonian (41.3–38.0 mya) and Priabonian (38.0–33.9 mya) genera are known from across Earth, including North America, Egypt, New Zealand, and Europe. Although no consensus exists regarding the mode of locomotion of which cetaceans were capable during the late Lutetian, they were very unlikely to have been nearly as well-adapted to the open ocean as living cetaceans. They probably reached as far as North America along coastal waters, either around Africa and over to South America, or more likely, over the Tethys Sea (between Eurasia and Africa) and along the coasts of Europe, Greenland, and North America.

The archaeocetes are paraphyletic in relation to their extant modern descendants, the Neoceti (neocetes). Neocetes consist of two subgroups, the toothed whales (odontocetes) and the baleen whales (mysticetes).

== Description ==
=== Pakicetidae ===
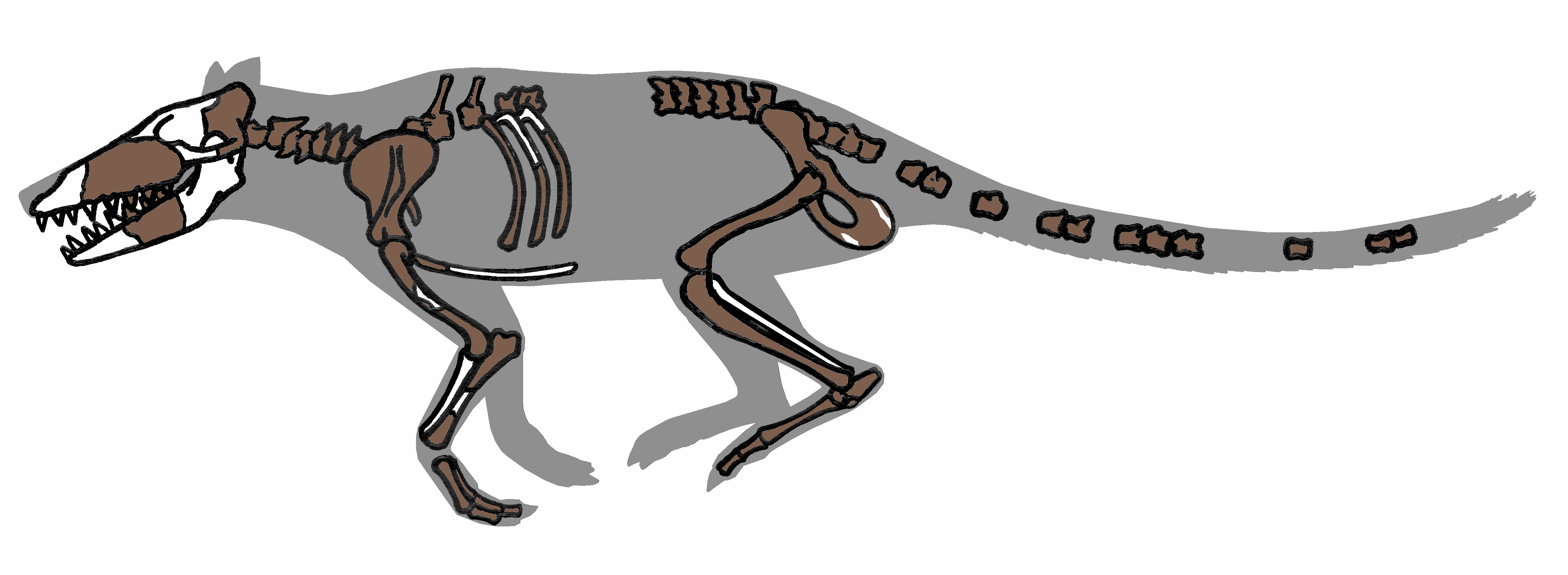
Pakicetus, a pakicetid (drawing showing preserved fossil remains).

First identified as cetaceans by West 1980, the pakicetids, the most archaic of whales, had long, slender legs and a long, narrow tail, and could reach the size of a modern wolf. They have only been found in sediments from freshwater streams in northwestern India and northern Pakistan, and were probably waders rather than swimmers.

Dozens of fossils are known, but only of skulls, teeth, and jaw fragments; no complete skeletons have been found. The dentition varied; the smallest species had teeth like modern fish eaters, and the largest were more like modern hyenas. The pakicetids may have been predators or carrion feeders. Neither the skull nor the dentition of pakicetids resembles those of modern whales, but the sigmoid process, involucrum, pachyostotic (compact) and rotated ossicles of their ears still reveal their cetacean nature.

=== Ambulocetidae ===
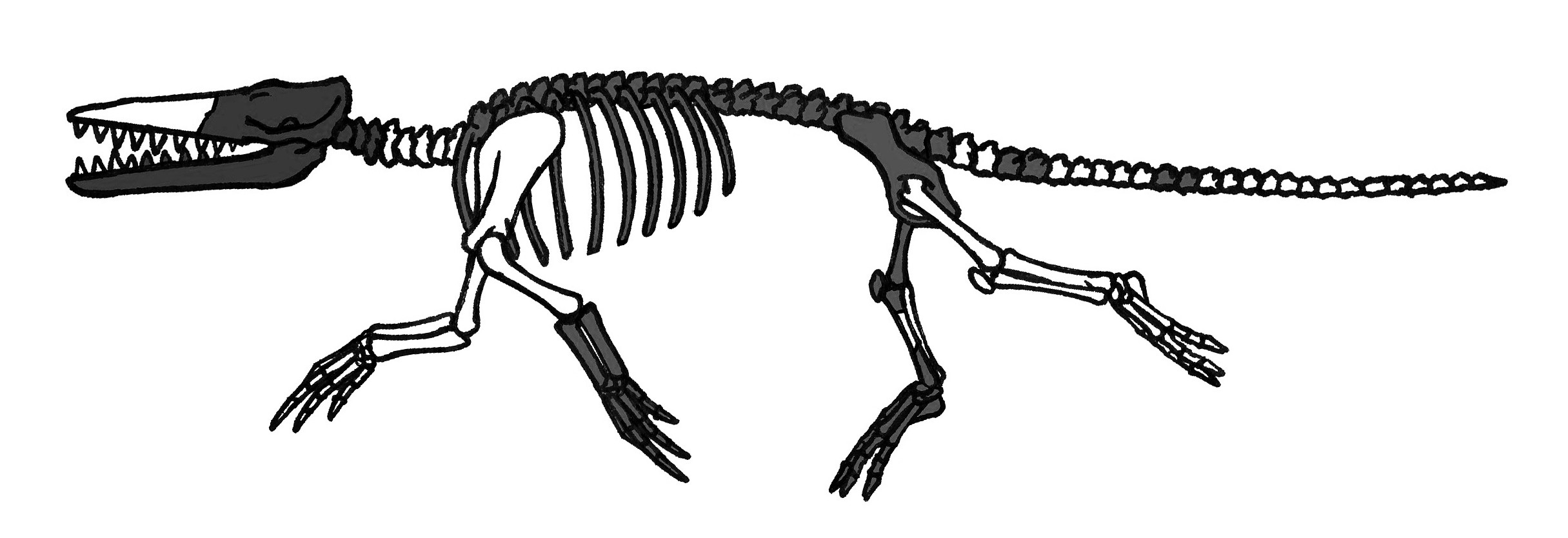
Ambulocetus, an ambulocetid (drawing showing preserved fossil remains).

The next diverging family of whales, the Ambulocetidae, were large, already aquatic, and crocodile-like with large feet and a strong tail. Sediments indicate that they lived in coastal areas and their compact bones suggest that they were ambush rather than fast-pursuit predators. Ambulocetids are also known exclusively from Pakistan and India.

Of the less than 10 fossils that have been described, one, Ambulocetus natans, is nearly complete and the main source of information concerning early cetacean evolution. The size of a male sea lion, it had a large head with a long snout and robust, strongly worn teeth. The lower jaw shows that Ambulocetus had an unusual soft tissue connecting the back of the jaw to the middle ear— a small equivalent to the large sound-receiving fat pad in modern odontocetes. Its eyes were placed dorsally on the head, but were facing laterally. The musculature of the head, neck, and back was strong and the fluke-less tail was long. The hind limbs were short, but equipped with long feet. The fore limbs were also short and equipped with five short hooves. Ambulocetus probably swam with its hind feet like a modern otter, and was incapable of supporting its own weight on land. It probably was an ambush hunter like modern crocodiles.

=== Remingtonocetidae ===
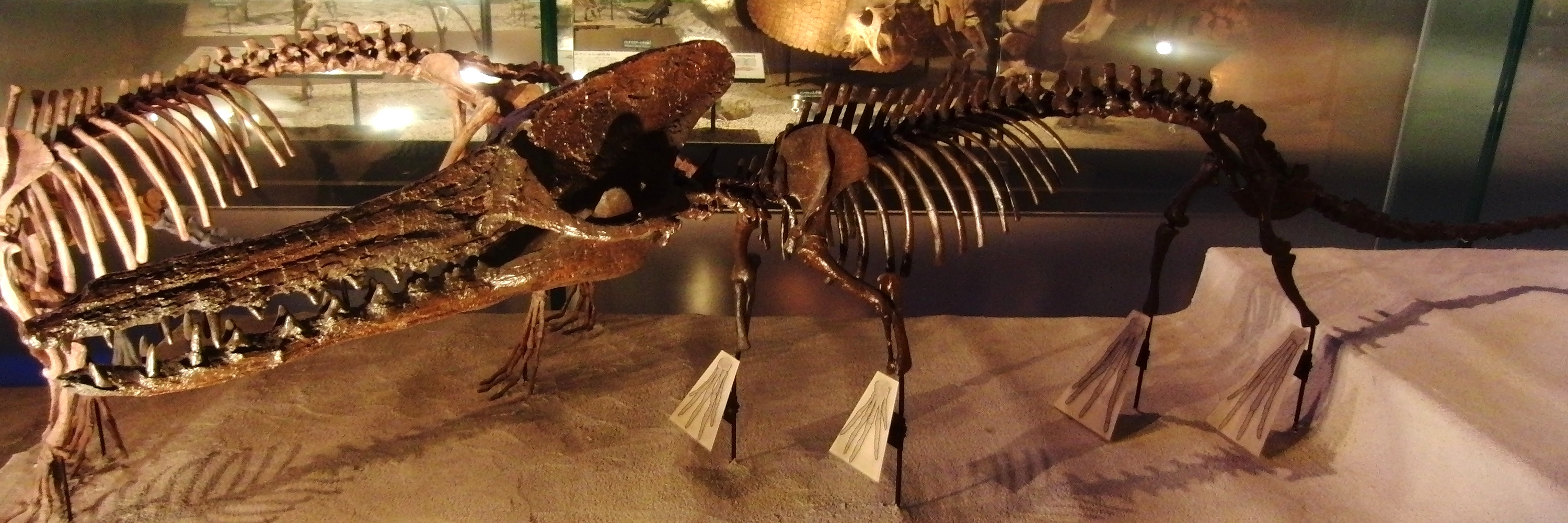
Kutchicetus, a remingtonocetid.

The Remingtonocetidae had short limbs, and a strong and powerful tail with flattened vertebrae. Their long snout, tiny eyes, and ear morphology suggest their vision was poor and that hearing was their dominant sense. They, too, have only been found in Pakistan and India, and sediments suggest that they lived in turbid waters in coastal areas. Remingtonocetids were probably able to live on land. They used their tails to swim.

Dozens of fossils have been described, but most are only skulls and lower jaws with few dental and postcranial remains. Remingtonocetids probably varied in size with the smallest species matching Pakicetus and the largest Ambulocetus. Remingtonocetids had longer snouts than other archaeocetes, except that the cranial morphology also varied considerably, probably reflecting different diets. The eyes were small, but the ears were large and set far apart — probably reflecting an increased emphasis on underwater hearing. The fragmentary remains of remingtonocetid postcrania suggest that they had a long neck and large hind limbs that were probably able to support the body weight on land.

The remaining families and later crown cetaceans form a clade united by six synapomorphies: The anterior margin of external nares is located above or behind the third upper incisor, the rostrum is wide, the supraorbital processes are present but short, the anterior edge of the orbit is located above the second or third upper molar, the postorbital process forms a 90° angle with the sagittal crest, and the cervical vertebrae are short.

=== Protocetidae ===
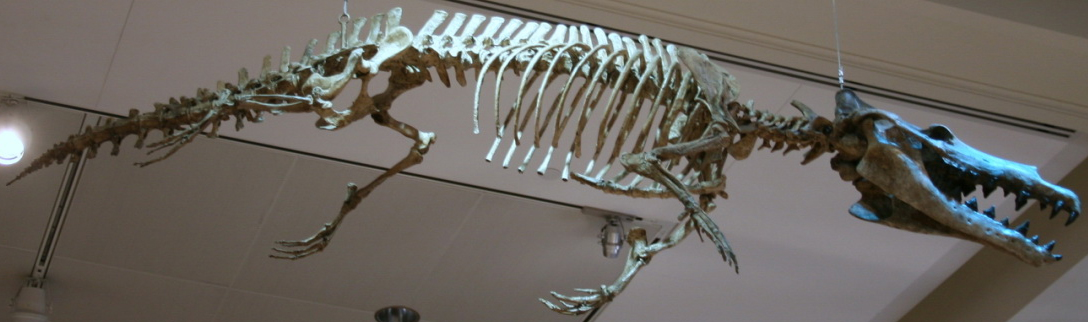
Maiacetus, a protocetid.

The Protocetidae, known from both Africa and America, were a diversified family with hind limbs and a strong tail, indicating that they were strong swimmers that colonized shallow and warm oceans, such as reefs. They greatly affected cetacean evolution 47 to 41 million years ago, because they spread across Earth's oceans. They had long snouts, large eyes, and a nasal opening located farther up the head than in earlier archaeocetes — suggesting they could breathe with the head held horizontally, similar to modern cetaceans — a first step towards a blowhole. Their dentition varied, but started to evolve towards the nonmasticating teeth of modern cetaceans, and they were probably active hunters. Their ability to move on land seems to have been variable: in Rodhocetus and Peregocetus possess a sacroiliac joint, indicating they could move on land. In other genera (Georgiacetus and Aegicetus), the pelvis was not connected to the vertebral column, suggesting the hind limbs could not have supported the body weight. Some genera (Rodhocetus) had large hind feet forming large paddles, while Aegicetus seems to have relied more on its tail to propel itself through the water.

=== Basilosauridae ===
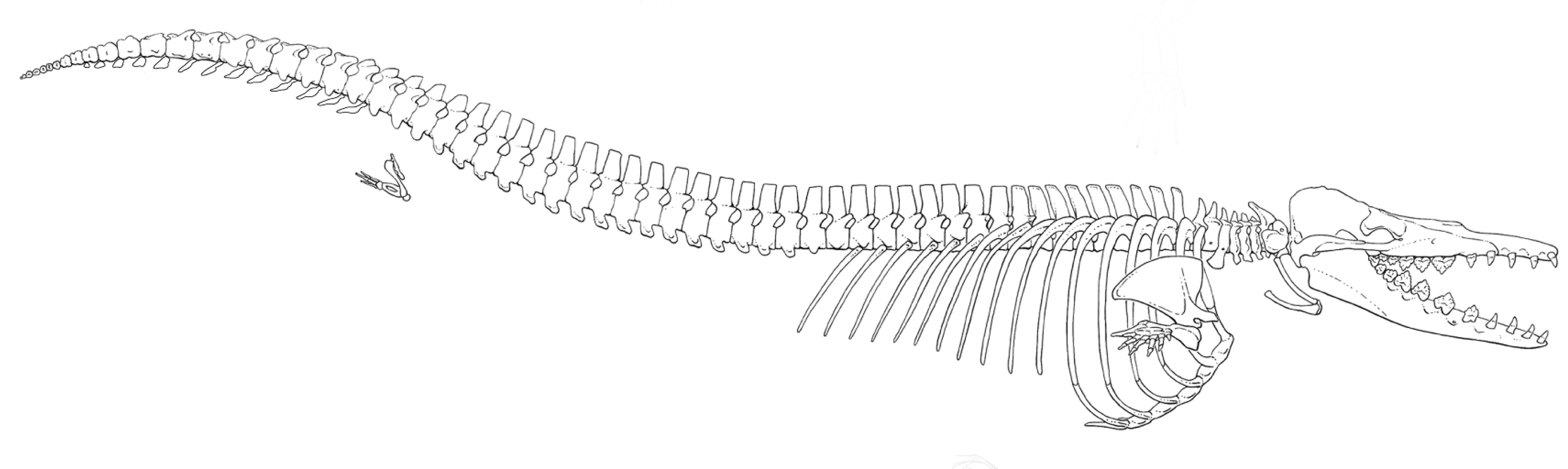
Dorudon, a basilosaurid.

Basilosaurids, which had tiny hind limbs and flipper-shaped fore limbs, were obligatorily aquatic and came to dominate the oceans. They still lacked the echolocation and baleen of modern odontocetes and mysticeti. Basilosaurids and dorudontids are the oldest obligate aquatic cetaceans for which the entire skeleton is known. They display a number of aquatic adaptations not present in earlier archaeocetes: In the vertebral column, the neck vertebrae are short, the thoracic and lumbar vertebrae are of similar length, the sacral vertebrae are unfused, the sacroiliac joints are absent, and the short tail has a ball vertebra (indicating the presence of a fluke). The scapulae are broad and fan-shaped with anterior acromions and small supraspinous fossae. The ulnae are large and have transversely flat olecranons, the wrists and distal forearms are flattened in the plane of the hands, and the hind limbs are tiny.

== Taxonomy ==
The Archaeoceti include five well-established families: The status of the Kekenodontidae is still disputed, and the family is placed in either the Archaeoceti, Mysticeti, or even Delphinoidea.

Cetartiodactyla

Archaeoceti

Pakicetidae (Thewissen, Madar & Hussain 1996)

Pakicetus (Gingerich & Russell 1981)
Nalacetus (Thewissen & Hussain 1998)
Ichthyolestes (Dehm & Oettingen-Spielberg 1958)

Ambulocetidae (Thewissen, Madar & Hussain 1996)

Ambulocetus (Thewissen, Madar & Hussain 1996)
Gandakasia (Dehm & Oettingen-Spielberg 1958)
Himalayacetus (Bajpai & Gingerich 1998)

Remingtonocetidae (Kumar & Sahni 1986)

Andrewsiphius (Sahni & Mishra 1975)
Attockicetus (Thewissen & Hussain 2000)
Dalanistes (Gingerich, Arif & Clyde 1995)
Kutchicetus (Bajpai & Thewissen 2000)
Remingtonocetus (Kumar & Sahni 1986)
Rayanistes (Bebej et al., 2016)

Protocetidae (Stromer 1908)

Georgiacetinae (Gingerich et al. 2005)

Aegicetus (Gingerich et.al. 2019)
Babiacetus (Trivedy & Satsangi 1984)
Carolinacetus (Geisler, Sanders & Luo 2005)
Crenatocetus (McLeod & Barnes 2008)
Georgiacetus (Hulbert et al. 1998)
Natchitochia (Uhen 1998)
Pappocetus (Andrews 1919)
Pontobasileus

Makaracetinae (Gingerich et al. 2005)

Makaracetus (Gingerich et al. 2005)

Protocetinae (Gingerich et al. 2005)

Aegyptocetus (Bianucci & Gingerich 2011)
Artiocetus (Gingerich et al. 2001)
Dhedacetus
Gaviacetus (Gingerich, Arif & Clyde 1995)
Indocetus (Sahni & Mishra 1975)
Maiacetus (Gingerich et al. 2009)
Peregocetus
Protocetus (Fraas 1904)
Phiomicetus (Gohar et al., 2021)
Qaisracetus (Gingerich et al. 2001)
Rodhocetus (Gingerich et al. 1994)
Takracetus (Gingerich, Arif & Clyde 1995)
Togocetus (Gingerich & Cappetta 2014)

Basilosauridae

Basilosaurinae

Basilosaurus (Harlan 1834)
Basiloterus (Gingerich et al. 1997)
Eocetus (Fraas 1904)

Dorudontinae

Ancalecetus (Gingerich & Uhen 1996)
Basilotritus (Goldin & Zvonok 2013)
Chrysocetus (Uhen & Gingerich 2001)
Cynthiacetus (Uhen 2005)
Dorudon (Gibbes 1845)
Masracetus (Gingerich 2007)
Ocucajea (Uhen et al. 2011)
Pontogeneus
Saghacetus (Gingerich 1992)
Stromerius (Gingerich 2007)
Supayacetus (Uhen et al. 2011)
Tutcetus (Antar et al. 2023)
Zygorhiza (True 1908)

Pachycetinae

Antaecetus
Pachycetus
Perucetus

Kekenodontidae

Kekenodon (Hector 1881)

== Phylogeny ==
- Whippomorpha
  - Hippopotamoidea
  - Cetaceamorpha
    - Raoellidae
    - Cetacea
      - Pakicetidae
      - - Ambulocetidae
        - - Remingtonocetidae
          - - Protocetidae
            - - Basilosaurinae
              - - Dorudontinae
                - Neoceti
                  - Odontoceti
                  - Mysticeti
