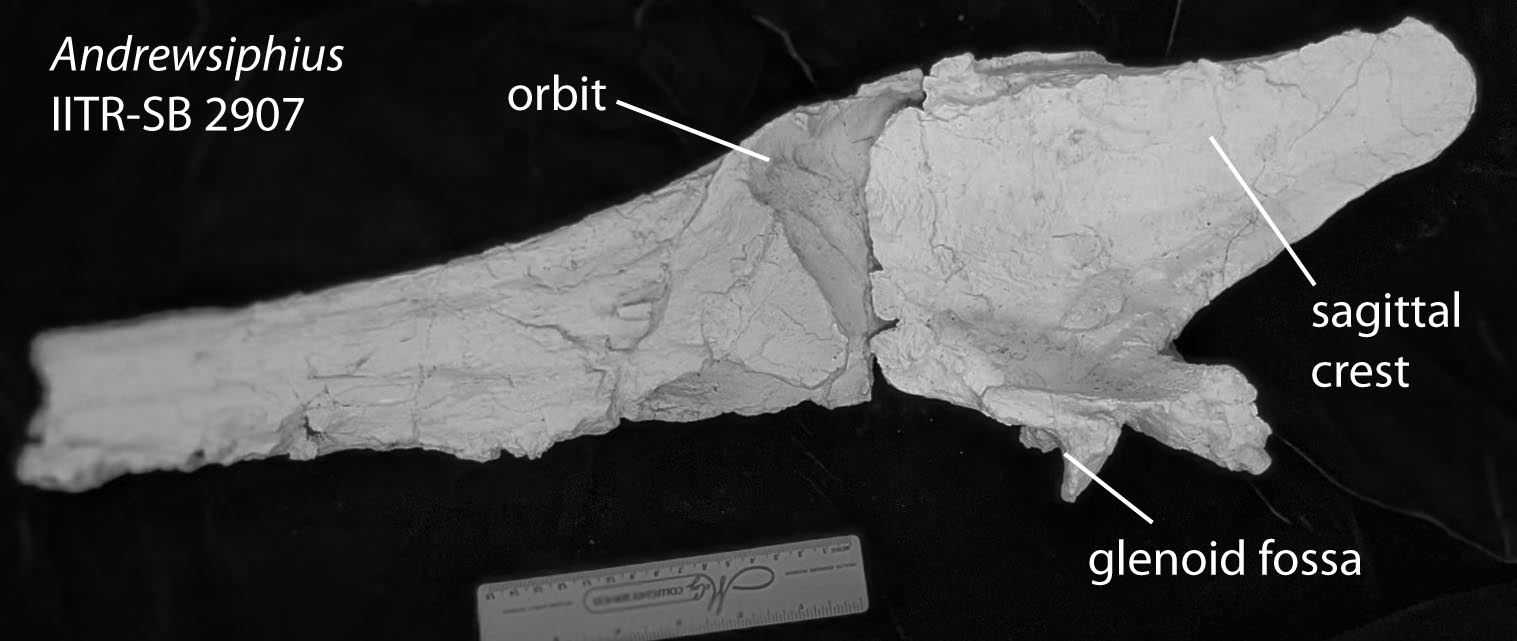
- Skull of Andrewsiphius

Scientific classification
- Kingdom: Animalia
- Phylum: Chordata
- Class: Mammalia
- Infraclass: Placentalia
- Order: Artiodactyla
- Infraorder: Cetacea
- Family: †Remingtonocetidae
- Subfamily: †Andrewsiphiinae; Thewissen and Bajpai, 2009

Genera
- †Andrewsiphius; †Kutchicetus?

= Andrewsiphiinae =

Andrewsiphiinae Temporal range: Eocene, 55.8–40.4 Ma

Subfamily of mammals

The Andrewsiphiinae is an extinct subfamily of early whales of the family Remingtonocetidae. Thiewessen & Bajpai (2009) proposed the clade when Andrewsiphius and Kuchicetus were accepted as separate genera. Kuchicetus was originally synonymized with Andrewsiphius in 2001 by Gingerich et al., but later authors, however, still accept both as separate genera.
