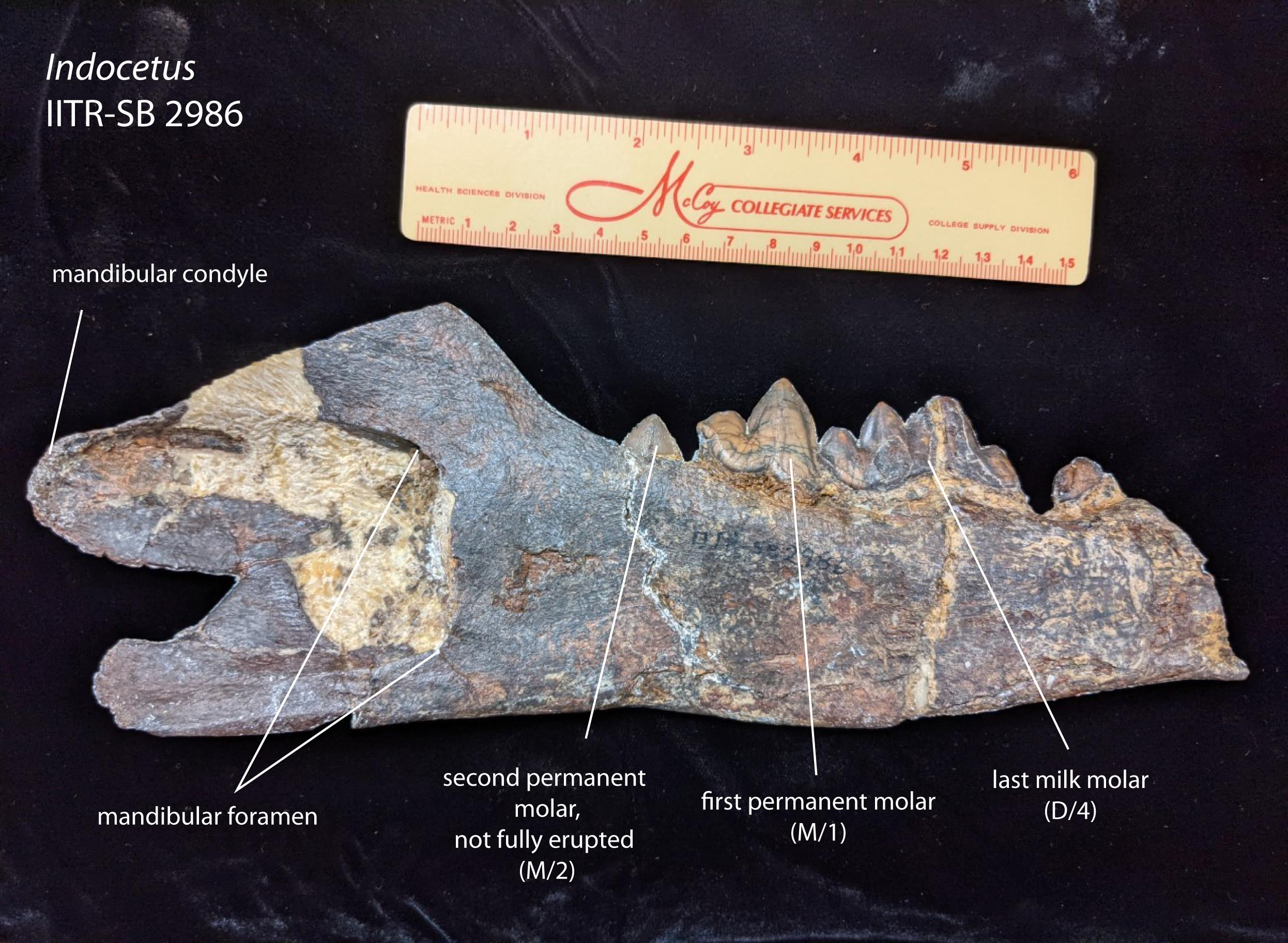
- Lower jaw of Indocetus

Scientific classification
- Kingdom: Animalia
- Phylum: Chordata
- Class: Mammalia
- Infraclass: Placentalia
- Order: Artiodactyla
- Infraorder: Cetacea
- Family: †Protocetidae
- Subfamily: †Protocetinae
- Genus: †Indocetus; Sahni & Mishra, 1975

Species
- I. ramani Sahni & Mishra, 1975

= Indocetus =

Indocetus Temporal range: late early Eocene (Lutetian), 48.6–40.4 Ma

Genus of mammals

Indocetus is a protocetid early whale known from the late early Eocene (Lutetian, 48.6 to 40.4 million years ago) Harudi Formation (23.5°N 68.7°E, paleocoordinates 5.9°N 61.7°E) in Kutch, India.

The holotype of Sahni & Mishra 1975 is a partial skull in two pieces with the frontal shield and the right occiput and auditory bulla preserved.

Gingerich et al. 1993 described postcranial remains from the Sulaiman Range, Punjab, Pakistan, and attributed them to Indocetus. Gingerich, Arif & Clyde 1995, however, withdrew this assignment and instead attributed this postcranial material to Remingtonocetus because of similarities to the then newly discovered remingtonocetid Dalanistes, including a longer neck and fused sacral vertebral elements. This leaves Indocetus without postcranial remains, but undescribed material (as of 1998) from Kutch most likely include some that can be attributed to Indocetus. Furthermore, Rodhocetus, also from Sulaiman, is very similar to Indocetus and it is possible that these genera are synonyms.

Indocetus is known from a partial skull, two endocasts, a right tympanic, and a right maxilla; all from the Harudi Formation. Indocetus has prominent protocones on the molars, distinguishing it from Protocetus, Eocetus, Babiacetus, and Georgiacetus. P^{1} is single-rooted like Rodhocetus. The tympanic bulla is more narrow than in Protocetus and Georgiacetus.

The endocasts included dental material, including alveoli and the bases of cheek teeth but not the crowns. P^{3–4} are three-rooted and probably had protocones. The molars are smaller than the premolars and decrease from M^{1} to M^{3}. M^{1} and M^{2} have large protocone lobes.
