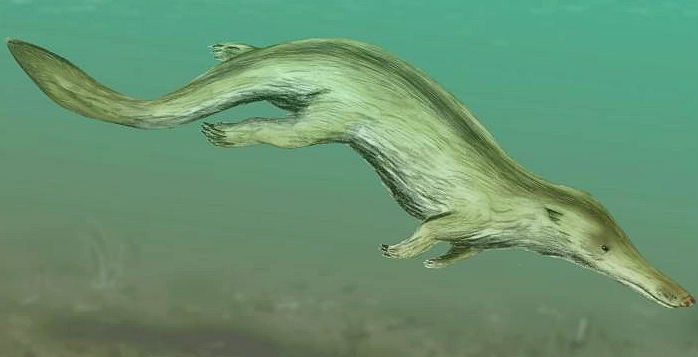
- Reconstruction of Kutchicetus

Scientific classification
- Kingdom: Animalia
- Phylum: Chordata
- Class: Mammalia
- Order: Artiodactyla
- Infraorder: Cetacea
- Family: †Remingtonocetidae
- Genus: †Kutchicetus; Bajpai & Thewissen
- Species: †K. minimus

Binomial name
- †Kutchicetus minimus Bajpai & Thewissen 2000

= Kutchicetus =

Kutchicetus Temporal range: Middle Eocene, 46–43 Ma

Genus of mammals (fossil)

Kutchicetus is an extinct genus of early whale of the family Remingtonocetidae that lived during Early-Middle Eocene (Lutetian and Ypresian) in what is now the coastal border of Pakistan and India (23.7°N 68.7°E, paleocoordinates 6.0°N 61.8°E). It is closely related to Andrewsiphius with which it was synonymized by Gingerich et al. 2001. Thewissen & Bajpai 2009 proposed a new clade, Andrewsiphiinae, for the two species. Later authors, however, still accept both as separate genera.

Kutchicetus is smaller than other remingtonocetids, and probably is the smallest Eocene cetacean. With its extremely narrow snout, it resembles Remingtonocetus and Dalanistes, but its strong tail distinguishes it from both Remingtonocetus and Andrewsiphius. Its limbs were short.

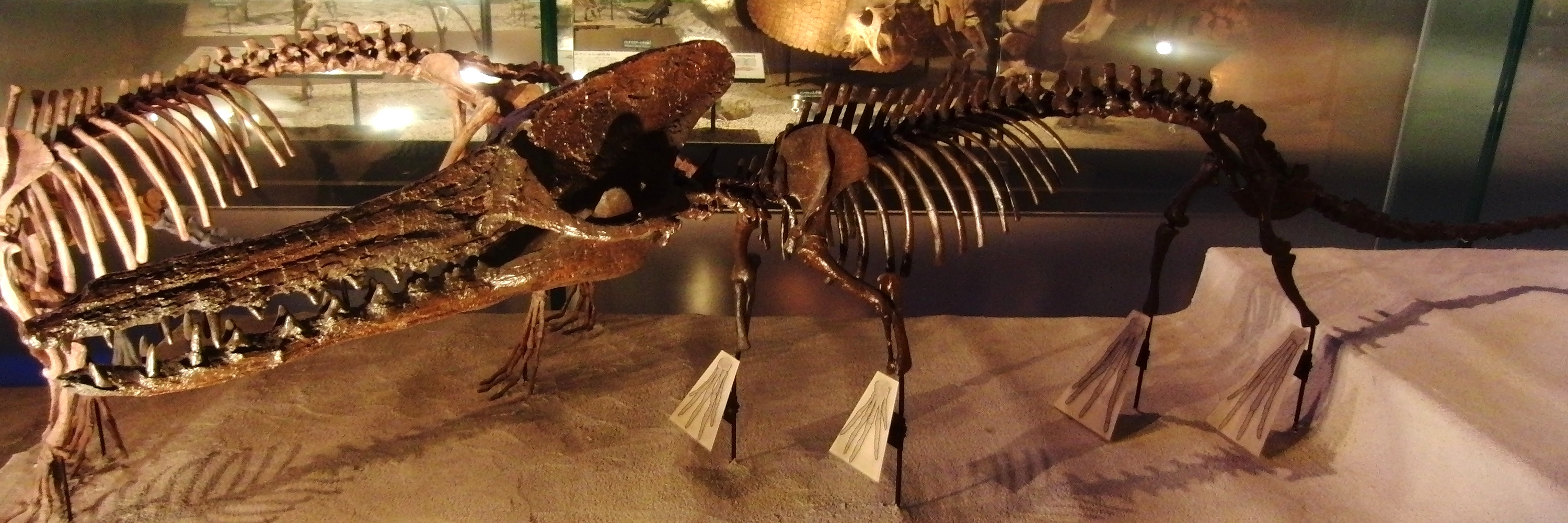
Skeleton of Kutchicetus minimus

Kutchicetus' vertebral formula is 7, 15, 8, 4, 20–25. Its four fused sacral vertebrae were probably articulated to the hip bone and the numerous tail vertebrae were robust and elongated in contrast to its short and relatively gracile limb bones. This morphology suggests that the tail played an important role in its locomotion, yet the proportions of the caudal-most vertebrae indicates Kutchicetus did not have flukes.

Kutchicetus vertebral proportions are unlike those of any other cetaceans but similar to those of some land-living or semi-aquatic mammals, such as Pachyaena and otters. Kutchicetus' limbs and sacrum were probably weight-bearing and it probably swam using undulatory movements like modern otters and most likely Ambulocetus.

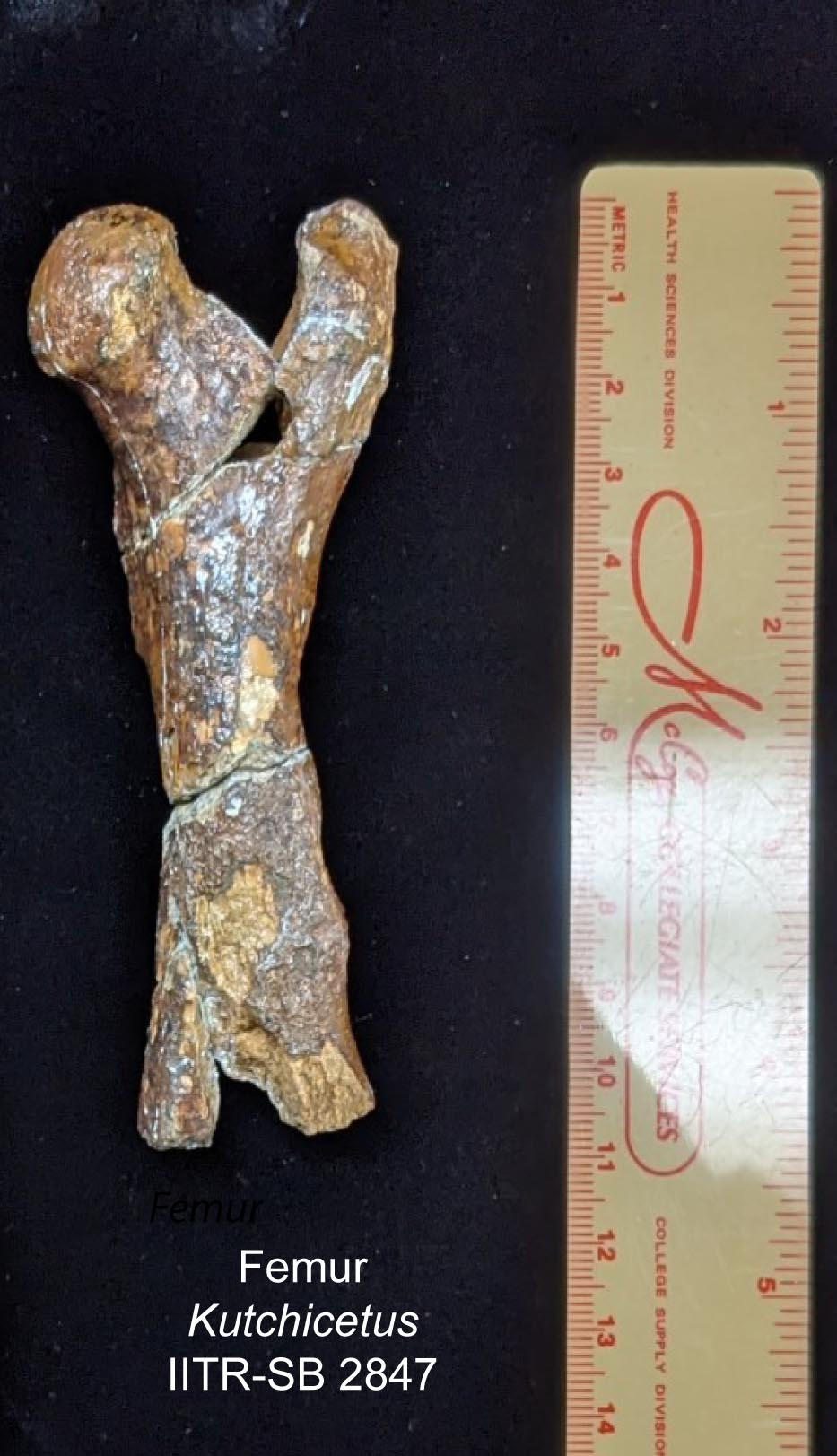
Femur of Kutchicetus (specimen IITR-SB 2847)

This mode of locomotion represents a transitional stage in whale evolution.

== See also ==
- Evolution of cetaceans
