= Hans Thewissen =

Dutch/American paleontologist

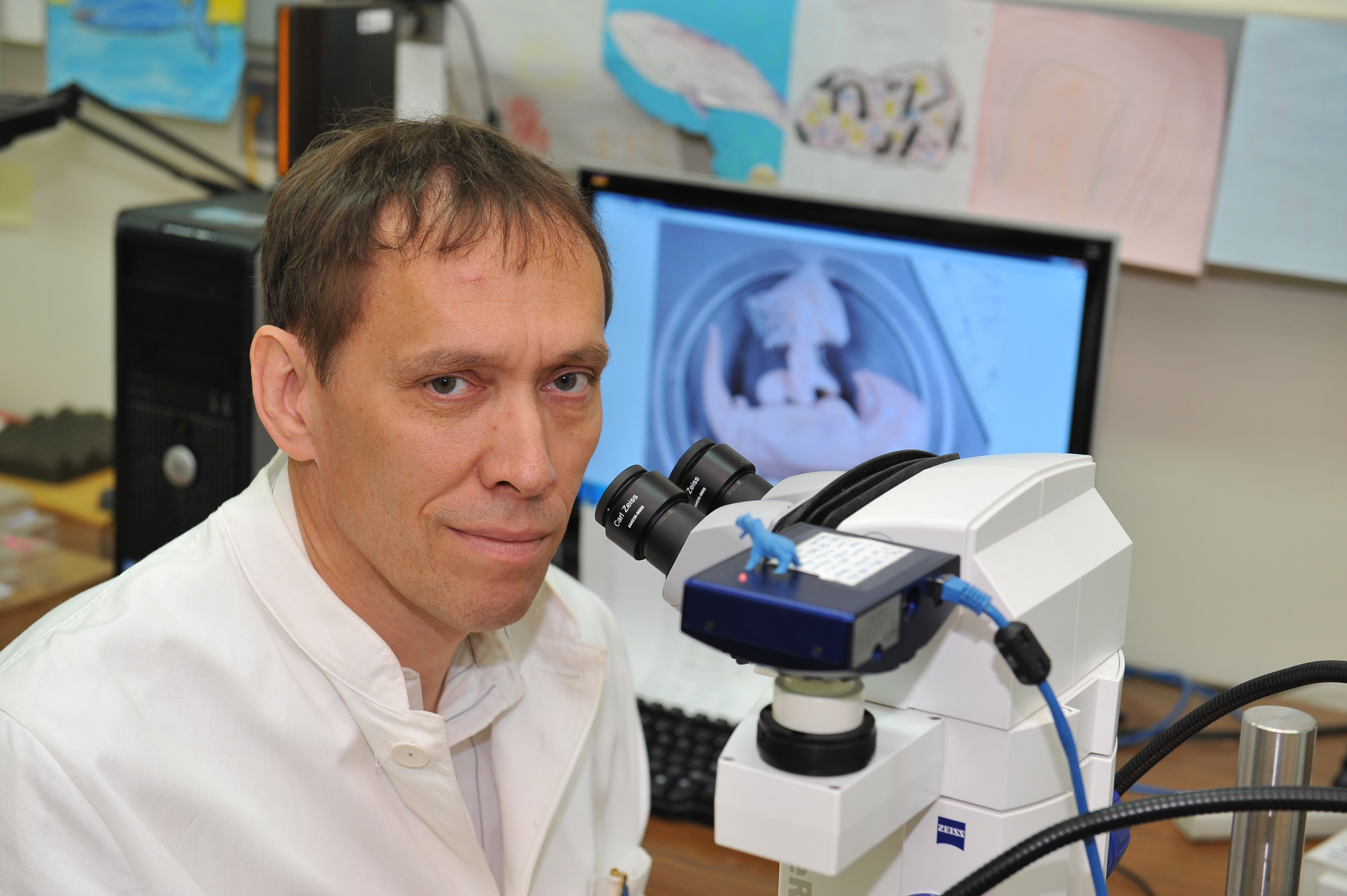
- Born: Johannes Gerardus Marie Thewissen; 28 November 1959 (age 66); Herkenbosch, Netherlands
- Education: University of Utrecht (MSc), University of Michigan (PhD)
- Known for: Ambulocetus; Pakicetus; Indohyus; Kutchicetus; Arctic whales
- Scientific career
- Fields: Paleontology, evolutionary biology, anatomy, embryology, Sensory ecology
- Workplaces: Northeast Ohio Medical University, Kent State University; Cleveland Museum of Natural History
- Thesis: Evolution of Paleocene and Eocene Phenacodontidae (Mammalia, Condylarthra) (1989)
- Doctoral advisor: Philip D. Gingerich

Johannes Gerardus Marie (Hans) Thewissen is a Dutch-American paleontologist known for his significant contributions to the field of whale evolution. Thewissen's fieldwork has led to the discovery of key fossils that have shed light on the transition of whales from land to water, including the discovery of Ambulocetus, Pakicetus, and Kutchicetus. In addition to his work on fossil discoveries, Thewissen also studies modern bowhead and beluga whales in Alaska, focusing on their biology and the implications of this knowledge for management and conservation efforts. His research has been instrumental in deepening our understanding of cetacean evolution and the adaptations that allowed these mammals to transition from terrestrial to fully aquatic lifestyles.

== Early life ==
Thewissen has always been interested in paleontology and natural history. His mother said that when Thewissen was a small boy, she had to sort through his pockets before laundry time to take out the rocks and worms he collected. His father used to take him to the town of Maastricht, and they collected fossils from the Maastrichtian period. His 12th birthday present was a rock hammer, which has accompanied him on all collecting trips since. He grew up just 2 miles from Liessel, a fossil locale that yielded the first whales he ever collected.

== Educational background ==
After finishing Gymnasium secondary education in Deurne, he completed undergraduate degrees in biology with a minor in geology in 1981 at the University of Utrecht.

Thewissen's M.S. projects involved work in three departments of the University of Utrecht. He studied a small artiodactyl from the Eocene of Pakistan in the Geology Department, the systematic position of aardvarks in the biology department, and the functional morphology of digging in the veterinary sciences.

He then earned an MSc cum laude degree in biology from the University of Utrecht in 1984. He studied for a semester at the Museum National d'Histoire Naturelle in Paris, before moving to the U.S. to earn a PhD in Geological Sciences at the University of Michigan, where he studied phenacodontids, a group of Paleogene ungulate mammals (condylarths) that is ubiquitous in North America (more than 6,000 fossils), but rare or absent in all other continents. The work with artiodactyls and phenacodontids brought familiarity with the terrestrial ancestors of cetaceans. At that time, paleontologists thought cetaceans were derived from another group of condylarths, mesonychians, even though molecular biologists later found evidence that cetaceans were closely related to artiodactyls.

After graduating from the University of Michigan, he moved to a postdoctoral position at Duke University Medical Center which is where he became interested in studying whales. Thewissen's work on pakicetids in 2001, and that of his former PhD advisor Philip Gingerich in the same year provided evidence to support a re-evaluation of all fossil evidence.

== Career ==
Thewissen was an assistant professor at Northeast Ohio Medical University (then called Northeastern Ohio Universities College of Medicine) from 1993 to 1999, then associate professor from 1999 to 2008.

In 2001, he was a visiting professor at the Tokyo Institute of Technology. Since 1994 he has been a research associate at the Cleveland Museum of Natural History. In 2008 he became the Ingalls-Brown Endowed Chair, Full Professor of Anatomy at Northeast Ohio Medical University. In February 2019, he was a scientist in residence at Sitka Sound Science Center, Alaska.

== Research ==
Thewissen discovered or worked on four missing links in the evolution of cetaceans. In addition, he worked on the following.

Cetacean evolutionary missing links researched by Thewissen

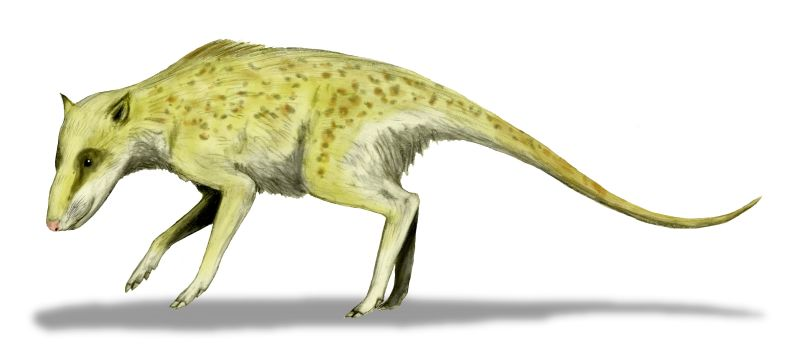
Indohyus (Raoellidae cca 49–48 Ma)

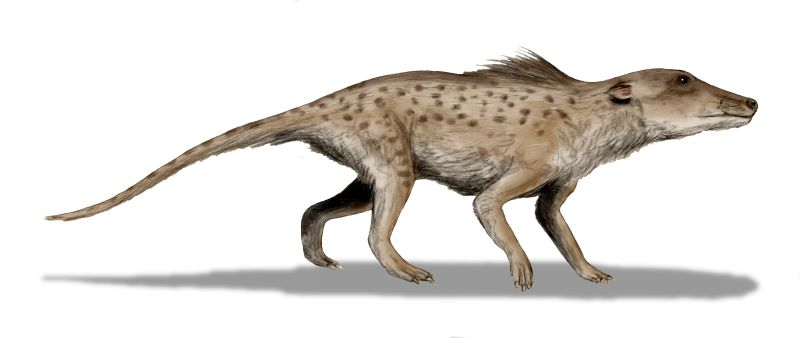
Pakicetus (Pakicetidae cca 49–48 Ma)

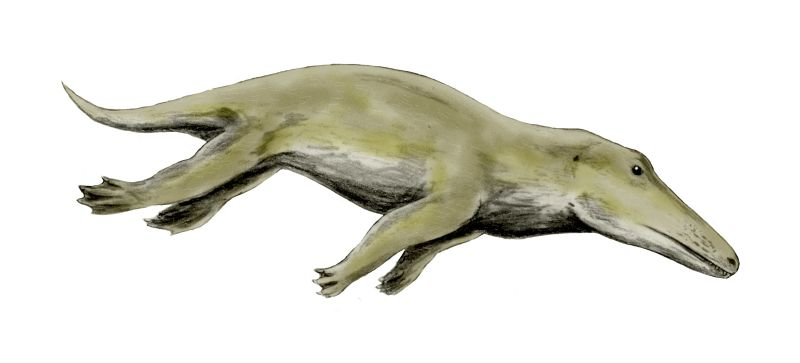
Ambulocetus (Ambulocetidae cca 49–48 Ma)

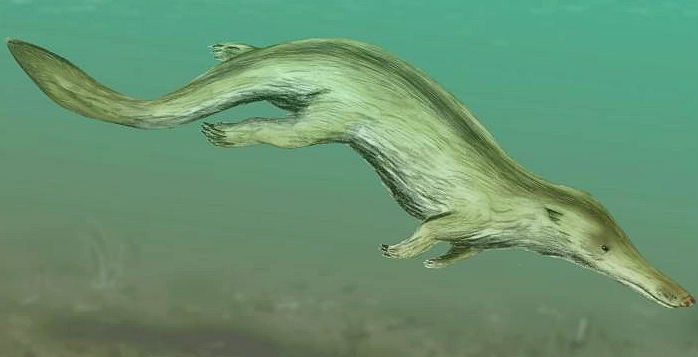
Kutchicetus (Remingtonocetidae cca 48 Ma)

=== Discovery of Ambulocetus ===
Thewissen and Hussain discovered a partial skeleton of a new cetacean Ambulocetus in 1992, working with and a team from the Geological Survey of Pakistan in the Kala Chitta Hills of Punjab, Pakistan.

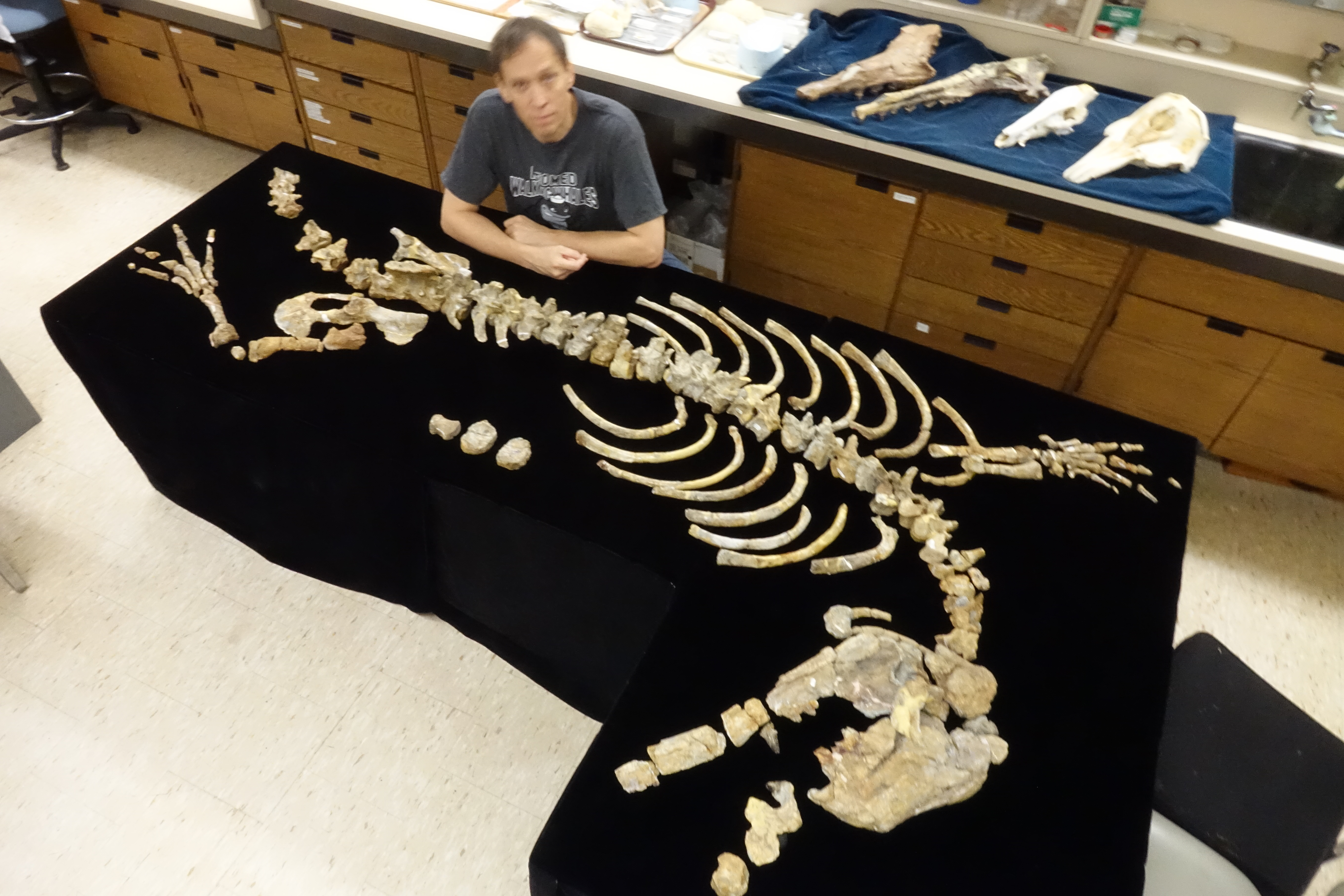
Thewissen and Ambulocetus natans

When this new ancestral whale appeared in the magazine Science in 1994, Stephen Jay Gould dubbed it 'as the smoking gun of whale evolution.

Ambulocetus was recovered from Pakistan(33.6°N 72.2°E, paleocoordinates 14.3°N 68.3°E) in 1993 by Thewissen and Muhammed Arif, and was described by Thewissen, Hussain, and Mohammad Arif in 1994.

While has been known since the time of Charles Darwin that cetaceans had ancestors that lived on land, this was the first skeleton that included limb bones strong enough to walk on land.

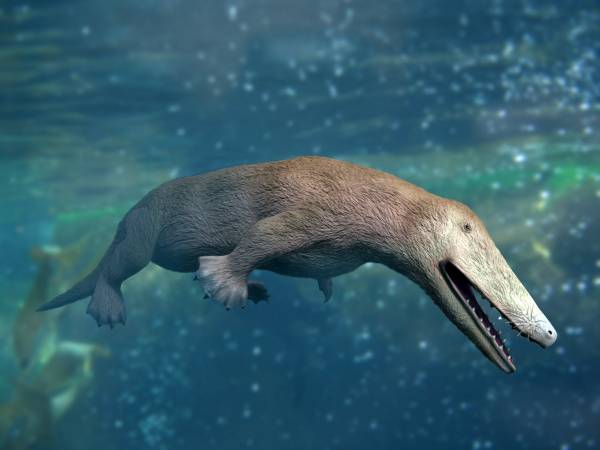
Ambulocetus natans

"I sat on the porch of a Pakistani guesthouse, puzzling over the sea lion-size skeleton that we had just dug up in the Kala Chitta Hills. I opened some of the packages containing fossil remains that I had wrapped earlier that day, and as I scraped with a dental tool, I realized that this was a whale—one that could walk around on the large hind legs that we had unearthed. It was the first such whale to be seen by a human, ever."

=== Discovery of Kutchicetus ===
Sunil Bajpai and Thewissen collected fossils in District Kutch, State of Gujarat, India, in the desert area close to the Pakistani border. Here, they found the skeleton of a small whale called Kutchicetus minimus. The holotype of Kutchicetus consists of some skull fragments, many vertebrae, and ribs and the limb bones, although parts of fore- and hind feet were not found. A jaw fragment allowed several whale skulls and lower jaws to be from the same species.

=== Discovery of Pakicetus ===
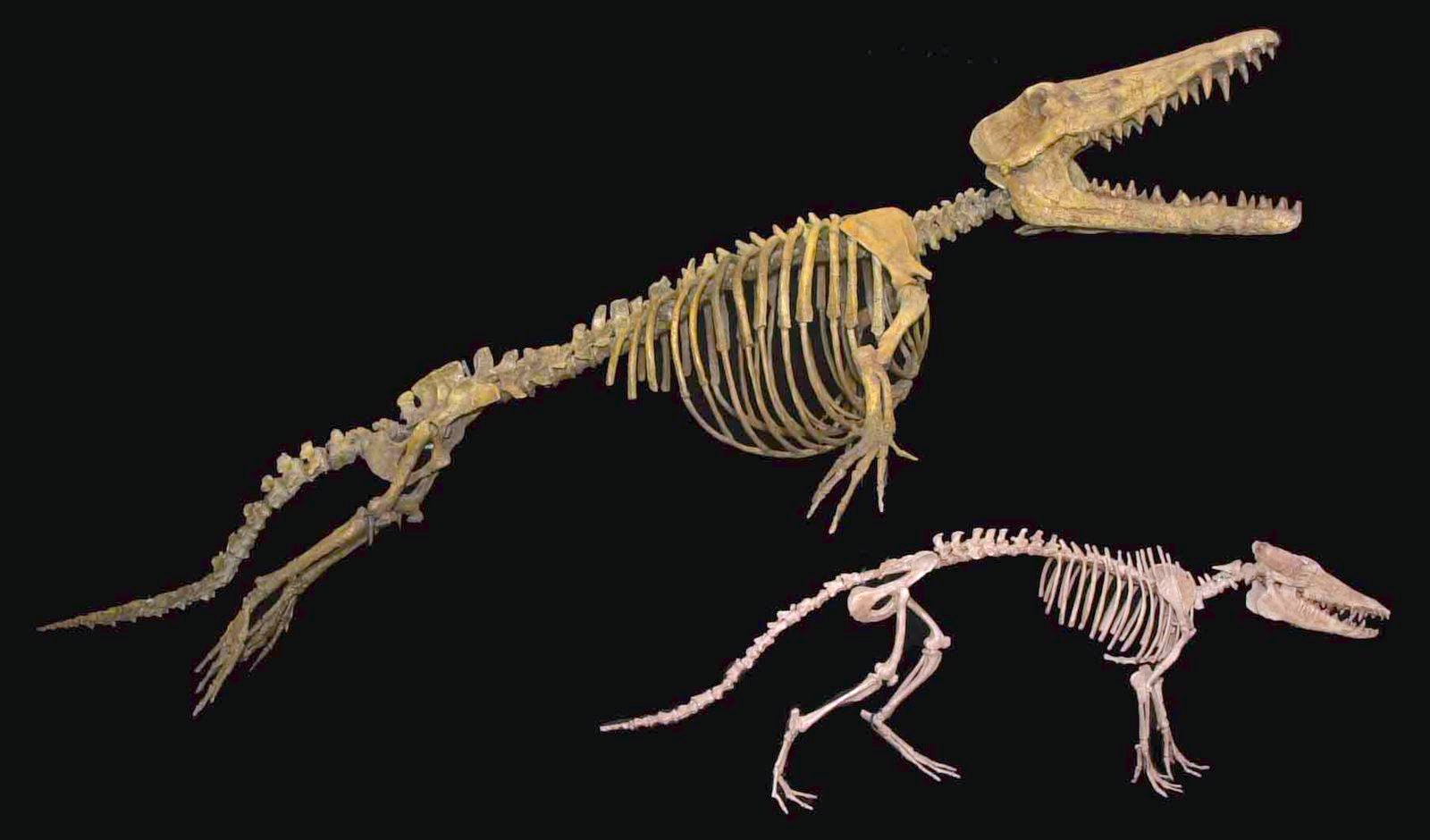
Ambulocetus (on top) Pakicetus Skeletons comparison

Teeth of Pakicetus were first found and recognized as cetaceans by the American paleontologist Robert West in 1980. However, the Kala Chita Hills in Pakistan is a bone bed where cetaceans and other animals were buried together, so anatomical association between different parts is lost, and West was unable to determine which skeleton bones were associated with the teeth.

Thewissen excavated the site further, discovering hundreds of bones of different mammal species. Whale teeth were the most common teeth recovered, and there were no mammals of the same sizes. This allowed the researchers to identify bones of the Pakicetus skeleton in a preliminary fashion. They later tested this identification by studying the stable isotopes of the bones, which matched the stable isotopes of the teeth and not those of the teeth of other mammals.

=== Research on Indohyus ===
The Indian geologist A. Ranga Rao collected fossils in the 1960s and 1970s in Indian Kashmir, which he named Indohyus. Upon his death, his widow, Dr. Friedlinde Obergfell, gave the rocks to Thewissen to study.

During the extraction of the fossils, the fossil preparator accidentally broke one of the skulls. In the cracked specimen, Thewissen recognized the ear structure of the auditory bulla which had a shape which is highly distinctive, found only in the skulls of living and extinct cetaceans, including Pakicetus. This suggested that Indohyus was related to cetaceans, and this was later confirmed by formal systematic analysis.

Thewissen was able to extract many skeletal bones of Indohyus, which showed that the species was similar in body shape to a modern mousedeer (also called chevrotains).

Thewissen postulates that the first steps whale ancestors took toward aquatic habitats may also have involved escaping predators.

Thewissen's discovery of Indohyus helped refine the connection between whales and hippos and suggested that Indohyus was closely related to hippos too.

Fred Spoor, an anthropologist at University College London, said the significance of the latest find was comparable to Archaeopteryx, the first fossils to show a clear transition between dinosaurs and birds. "For years, cetaceans were used by creationists to support their views because for a long time, the most primitive whales known had bodies that looked like modern whales, so there seemed to be this enormous gap in Evolution. But since the early 1990s, there's been a rapid succession of fossils from India and Pakistan that beautifully fill that gap," he said.

=== Embryology ===
Thewissen acquired access to a collection of embryos of the pantropical spotted dolphin (Stenella attenuata). This dolphin has hind limbs as an embryo, but the limbs are lost as the embryo develops. This work formed the basis for a study of gene control in development. In addition, Thewissen's lab studied the unusual aspects of the dentition of these dolphins, namely the absence of replacement teeth, the similarity of the shape of teeth across the toothrow, and the significant number of their teeth.

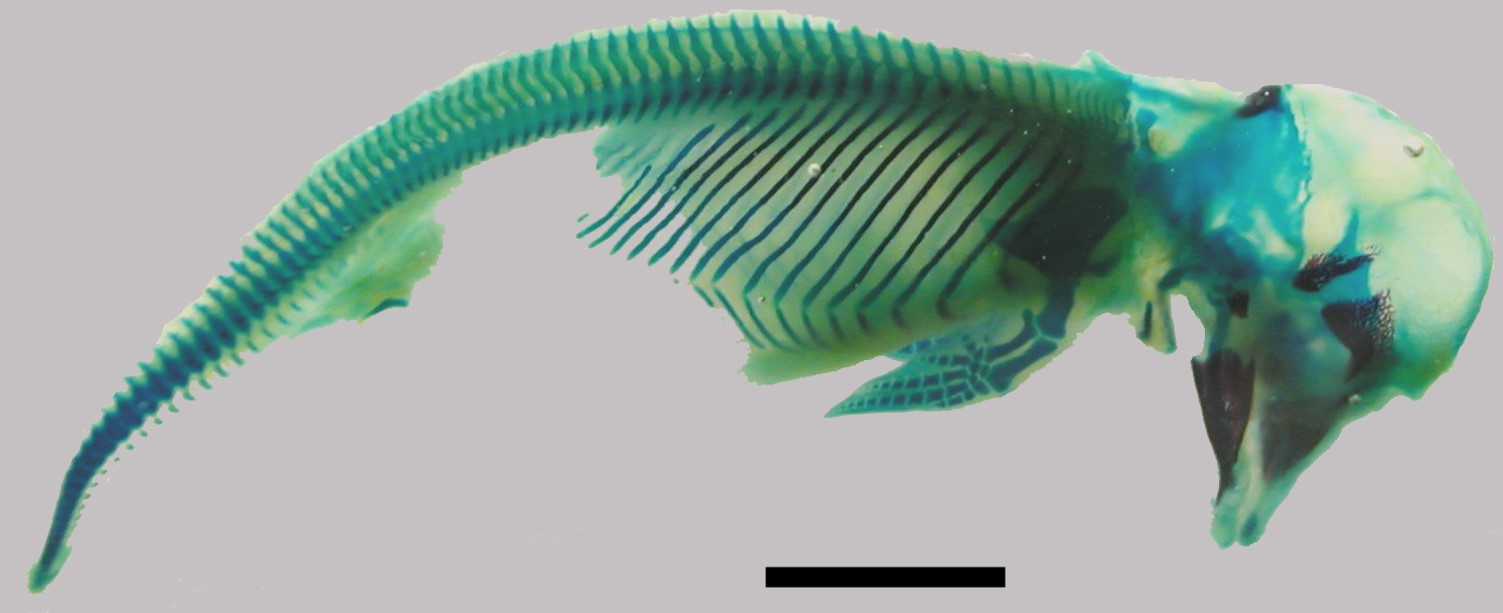
Fetus of dolphin showing similarities between land mammals and modern cetaceans. The pelvic remnant is seen as a small blue bar below the tail, and the many bones of the forelimb match those of land mammals. The large brains of cetaceans are growing and not protected by bone at this stage. The fetal tissues were made transparent, cartilage was stained blue, and bone purple. Scale bar is 1 cm.

=== Sensory organ evolution ===
To gain access to modern whale soft tissues, Thewissen began traveling to Alaska's north slope. Working in collaboration with the Department of Wildlife Management of the North Slope Borough, Thewissen gained access to the small number of bowhead and beluga whales which are captured yearly by native Alaskans as an indigenous exemption to the Marine Mammal Protection Act. Here, Thewissen discovered that parts of the bowhead whale's brain are dedicated to smell (the olfactory bulbs), something which had never before been confirmed in any cetaceans, and which confirmed the long-held views of Inupiat Alaskans that bowheads have a sense of smell.

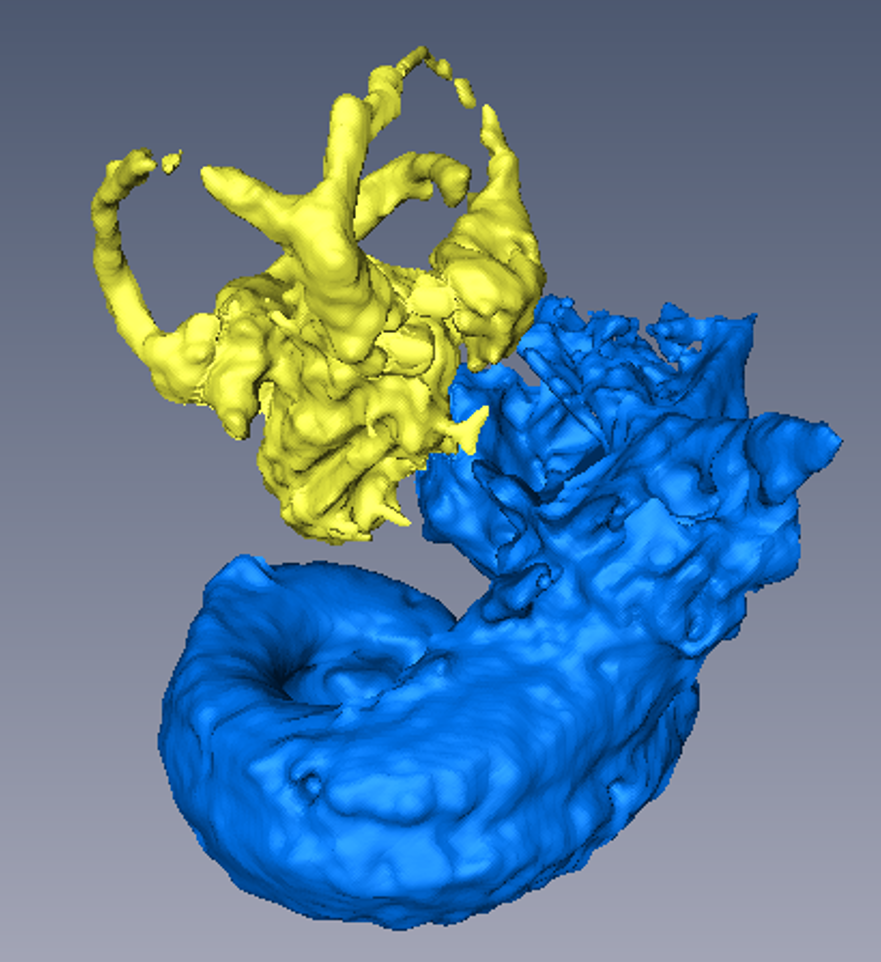
The organ of balance, yellow, and that of hearing, blue, in this 43-million-year-old Andrewsiphius

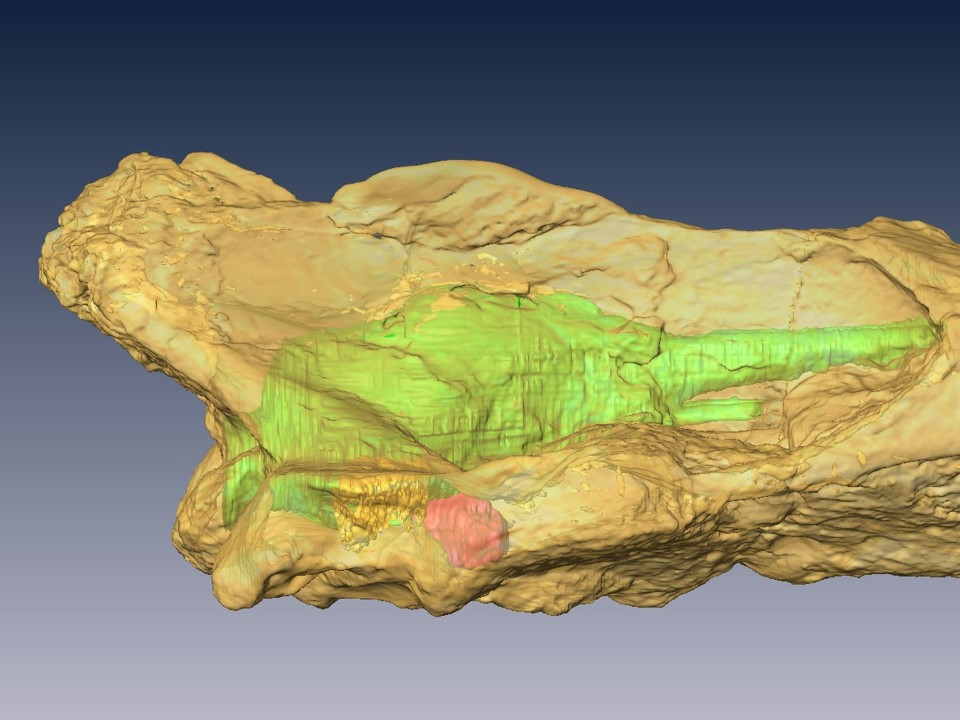
The braincase of 43-million-year-old Remingtonocetus, with brain (green) and ear (yellow and red) showing through, as based on high-resolution CT scan. The large green canal on the right carries the olfactory nerve and indicates that these whales had a developed sense of smell.

=== Age estimation of modern whales ===
Thewissen's lab was instrumental in estimating the age of Arctic whales. This data is crucial to gathering data on overall population rate of increase or decrease.

Some cetaceans, such as belugas, lay down layers in their teeth, analogous to tree rings. Thewissen's lab determined that there are several sets of finer repeated layers within the large-scale layers. One of these finer sets is linked to daily processes, and indeed, the thickness of 365 of these layers matches one large-scale layer, suggesting that the large-scale layers reflect annual intervals.

Bowhead whales do not have teeth, but their baleen plates grow with age and can be used to estimate age in younger whales. It was already established that one of the bones of the ear, the tympanic part of the temporal bone, grows annually by laying down a layer of bone. Thewissen's lab studied this for bowhead and determined that this bone may also be used for determining age in this species. Both dental aging and the temporal bone aging are effective methods for determining age in fossil whales.

Thewissen also established that in some cases the presence of earwax in bowhead whales may be used to establish age. In some baleen whales, earwax grows in annual layers that are not expelled through the ear canal and this can be used in age estimation.

=== Brain evolution research ===
Thewissen's current work involves counting neurons in bowhead and beluga whale brain samples, to assess brain function, in Utqiaġvik—formerly Barrow—Alaska. Though the size of the brains of sperm whales and killer whales are larger than those of any other organism, including humans, a better measure of brain function is to determine how many neurons there are in the brain. Suzana Herculano-Houzel has developed a method of counting of neurons of human and other animals' brains and the relation between the cerebral cortex area and thickness and number of cortical folds. Humans and other primates pack about twice the number of neurons in a cubed inch of brain as most other mammals.

== Appearances in science films and TV shows ==
Discovery Channel, "Paleoworld", 1994."Back to the Seas" Paleoworld (Season 1)

BBC, "Walking with Beasts", 2001 (work covered with extensive interviews).

NHK (Japanese National Public Television), "The Oceans", 1996

Discovery Channel, 2001 "The Oceans".

Discovery Channel (BBC produced), 2006. Life in the Womb (Prenatal development in dolphins).

Animals in the Womb, 2006

Evolutions (National Geographic Channel), 2009.

Morphed, 2009

== Bibliography ==
=== Books ===
- Thewissen, J. G. M. (2014). The walking whales: from land to water in eight million years. University of California Press.
- Würsig, Bernd; J. G. M Thewissen & Kit Kovacs, eds. (2017). Encyclopedia of marine mammals (3rd ed.). Academic Press.

=== Critical studies and reviews of Thewissen's work ===
The walking whales

- Holmes, Bob (11 October 2014). "The thrill of the chase: the inside story of how whale evolution was uncovered is a gripping tale". New Scientist. 224 (2990): 51.
