= Rayanistes =

Rayanistes Temporal range: Middle Eocene, 45–41 Ma

Scientific classification
- Domain: Eukaryota
- Kingdom: Animalia
- Phylum: Chordata
- Class: Mammalia
- Order: Artiodactyla
- Infraorder: Cetacea
- Family: †Remingtonocetidae
- Genus: †Rayanistes; Bebej, Zalmout, El-Aziz, Antar, and Gingerich, 2016
- Species: †R. afer

Binomial name
- †Rayanistes afer Bebej, Zalmout, El-Aziz, Antar, and Gingerich, 2016

Extinct genus of whale

Rayanistes is a genus of remingtonocetid whale from the Middle Eocene deposits in Egypt.

== Significance and biology ==
Rayanistes was capable of extensive power strokes during pelvic paddling, based on the robust hindlimb and innominate. The more abducted orientation of its femur allowed for greater maneuverability of the hip joint in contrast to that of Remingtonocetus. The discovery of Rayanistes is significant because it shows that the most primitive non-pelagicete cetaceans were becoming widespread beyond the southern margin of the ancient Tethys sea.
