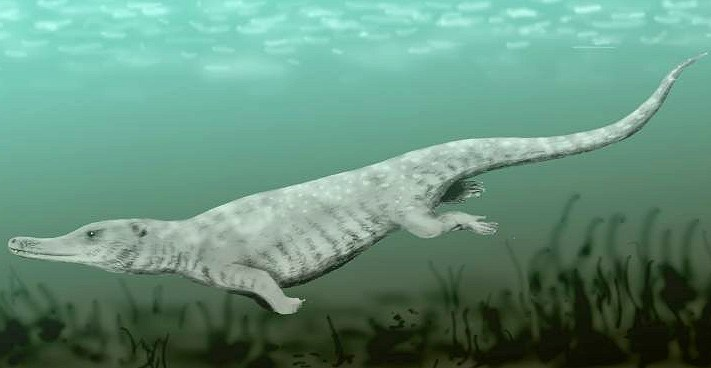
- Remingtonocetus
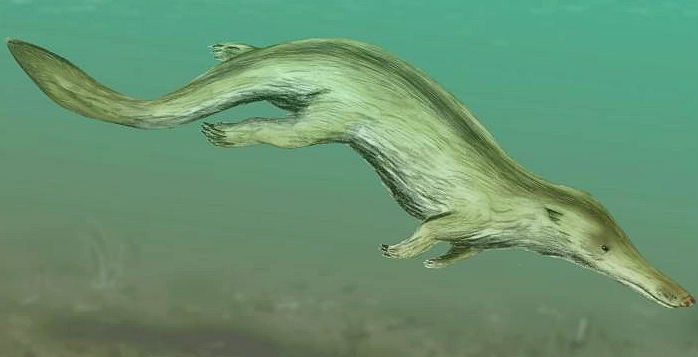
- Kutchicetus

Scientific classification
- Kingdom: Animalia
- Phylum: Chordata
- Class: Mammalia
- Order: Artiodactyla
- Infraorder: Cetacea
- Family: †Remingtonocetidae; Kumar & Sahni 1986

Genera
- †Attockicetus; †Dalanistes; †Rayanistes; †Remingtonocetus; †Andrewsiphiinae

= Remingtonocetidae =

Remingtonocetidae Temporal range: Early-Middle Eocene, 47.8–40.4 Ma

Family of mammals

Remingtonocetidae is a diverse family of early aquatic mammals of the order Cetacea. The family is named after paleocetologist Remington Kellogg.

== Description ==
Remingtonocetids have long and narrow skulls with the external nare openings located on the front of the skull. Their frontal shields are narrow and their orbits small. Their mouth has a convex palate and an incompletely fused mandibular symphysis. The dental formula is 3.1.4.33.1.4.3. The anterior teeth are flattened mediolaterally, making them appear shark-like.

In the postcranial skeleton, the cervical vertebrae are relatively long and the sacrum is composed of four vertebrae of which at least three are fused. The acetabular notch is narrow or closed and on the femoral head the fovea is absent.

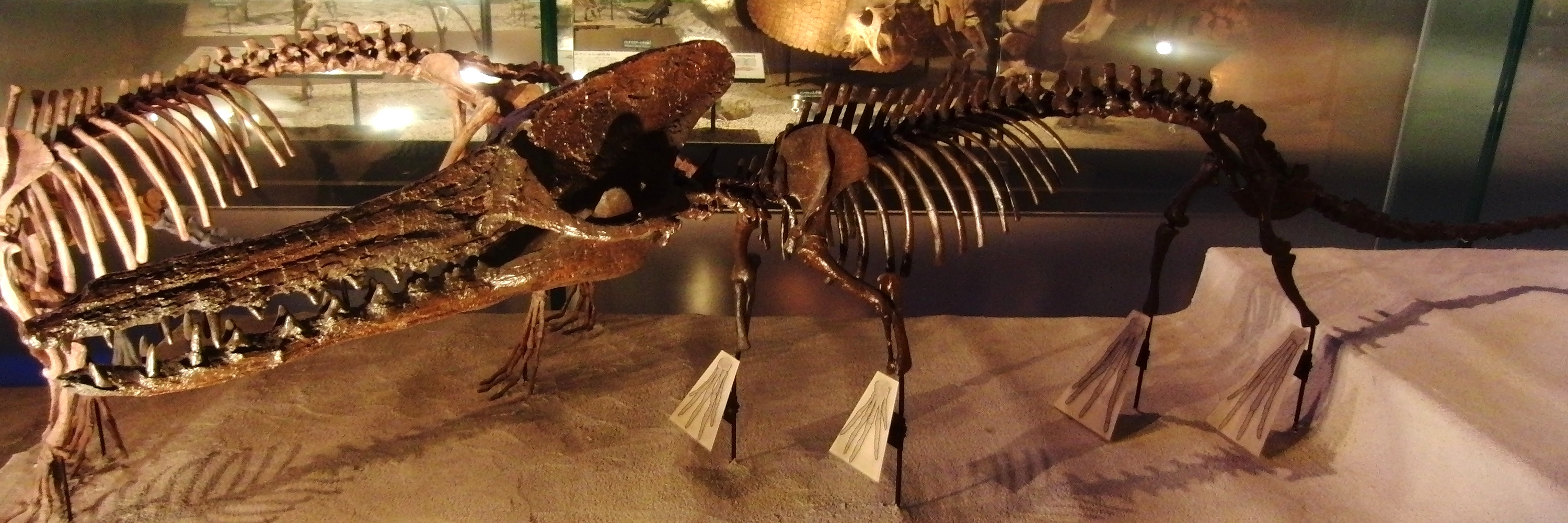
Skeleton of Kutchicetus minimus

Cranial fossils are common but dental remains are rare. The postcrania morphology is based entirely on a single specimen of Kutchicetus which was small and had a long and muscular back and tail. Perhaps remintonocetids swam like the South American giant otter which swims with its long flat tail.

With long and low bodies, relatively short limbs, their elongated rostrum, remingtonocetids looked like mammalian crocodiles, more so than Ambulocetus. They could both walk on land and swim in the water and most likely lived in a near-shore habitat. At least one genus, Dalanistes, had a marine diet.

Remingtonocetids are often found in association with catfish and crocodilians, as well as protocetid whales and sirenians. They were probably independent of freshwater.

== Distribution ==
Remingtonocetidae was long considered endemic to the northern coastline of the ancient Tethys Ocean (in present day Pakistan and India) during the Eocene, but the discovery of Rayanistes in Egypt indicates that remingtonocetids had a broader distribution than previously thought. A single tooth recovered from the Castle Hayne Limestone of North Carolina, USA closely resembles that of remingtonocetids; if it belongs to one, it indicates that they may have been found as far west as eastern North America, expanding their distribution across the Atlantic.

== Taxonomy ==
Remingtonocetidae was established by Kumar & Sahni 1986. It was considered monophyletic by Uhen 2010. It was assigned to Odontoceti by Benton 1993; to Remingtonocetoidea by Mitchell 1989 and Rice 1998; to Archaeoceti by Bianucci & Landini 2007; to Archaeoceti by Kumar & Sahni 1986, Fordyce & Barnes 1994, Fordyce, Barnes & Miyazaki 1995, McKenna & Bell 1997, Fordyce & Muizon 2001, Gingerich et al. 2001, Fordyce 2003, Geisler & Sanders 2003 and McLeod & Barnes 2008 and to Cetacea by Thewissen, Williams & Hussain 2001, Uhen 2010 and Thewissen & Bajpai 2009.

The name of the family was derived from the type genus Remingtonocetus, which was named after paleocetologist Remington Kellogg.

In 2009, paleontologists Thewissen & Bajpai proposed the subfamily Andrewsiphiinae for the genera Andrewsiphius and Kutchicetus.

== Genera ==
- Remingtonocetus (type) Kumar & Sahni 1986
- Andrewsiphius Sahni & Mishra 1975
- Attockicetus Kumar & Sahni 1986, the oldest genus
- Dalanistes Gingerich, Arif & Clyde 1995
- Kutchicetus Thewissen & Hussain 2000
- Rayanistes Bebej, Zalmout, El-Aziz, Antar, and Gingerich, 2016

== See also ==
- Evolution of cetaceans
