= Pontobasileus =

Pontobasileus Temporal range: Eocene

Scientific classification
- Kingdom: Animalia
- Phylum: Chordata
- Class: Mammalia
- Order: Artiodactyla
- Infraorder: Cetacea
- Family: †Protocetidae
- Subfamily: †Georgiacetinae
- Genus: †Pontobasileus; Leidy, 1873
- Species: †P. tuberculatus

Binomial name
- †Pontobasileus tuberculatus Leidy, 1873

Genus of mammals

Pontobasileus is an archaeocete whale known from a fragment of a single tooth described by Leidy 1873. It can questionably be dated to the Eocene of Alabama.

Leidy assigned the tooth to Archaeoceti, but without neither a stratigraphic nor a geographic locality it is virtually impossible to argue for or against this classification. The tooth was later classified as an Archaeoceti incertae sedis and even a squalodont odontocete (a more recent whale), but can also be assigned to Protocetidae.
