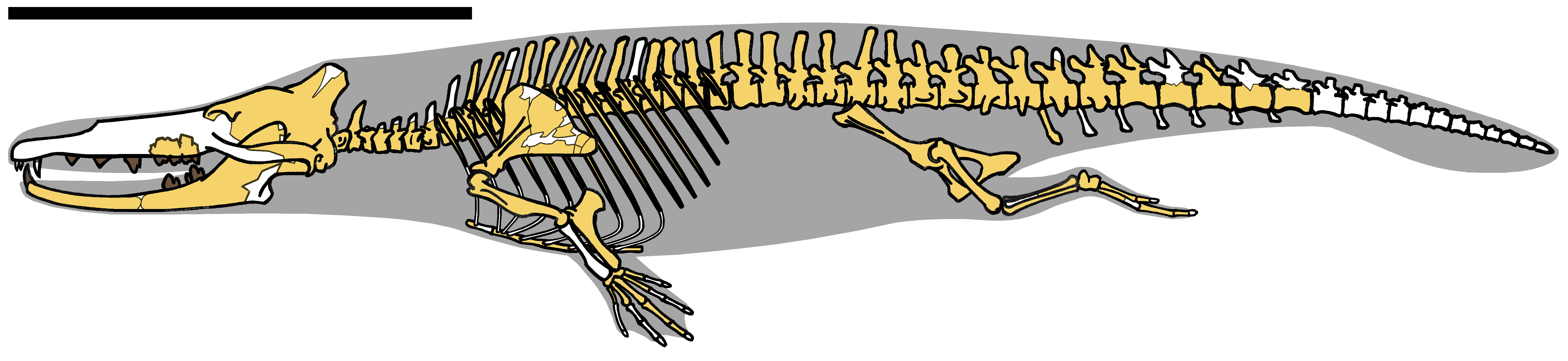
- Drawing of Aegicetus skeleton in swimming position showing known remains in gold

Scientific classification
- Kingdom: Animalia
- Phylum: Chordata
- Class: Mammalia
- Order: Artiodactyla
- Infraorder: Cetacea
- Family: †Protocetidae
- Subfamily: †Georgiacetinae
- Genus: †Aegicetus; Gingerich et al., 2019
- Species: †A. gehennae

Binomial name
- †Aegicetus gehennae Gingerich et al., 2019

= Aegicetus =

Aegicetus Temporal range: Late Eocene, 35 Ma

Extinct genus of whales

Aegicetus is an extinct genus of protocetid whale based on a partial skull with much of an associated postcranial skeleton discovered in Egypt. It lived around 35 million years ago (during the Late Eocene), making it the youngest known protocetid to date. Aegicetus was discovered in 2007 at Wadi El Hitan (Gehannam Formation) as a relatively complete skeleton and a partial second specimen. They were assigned to a new genus and species in 2019 by Philip D. Gingerich et al.

== Description ==
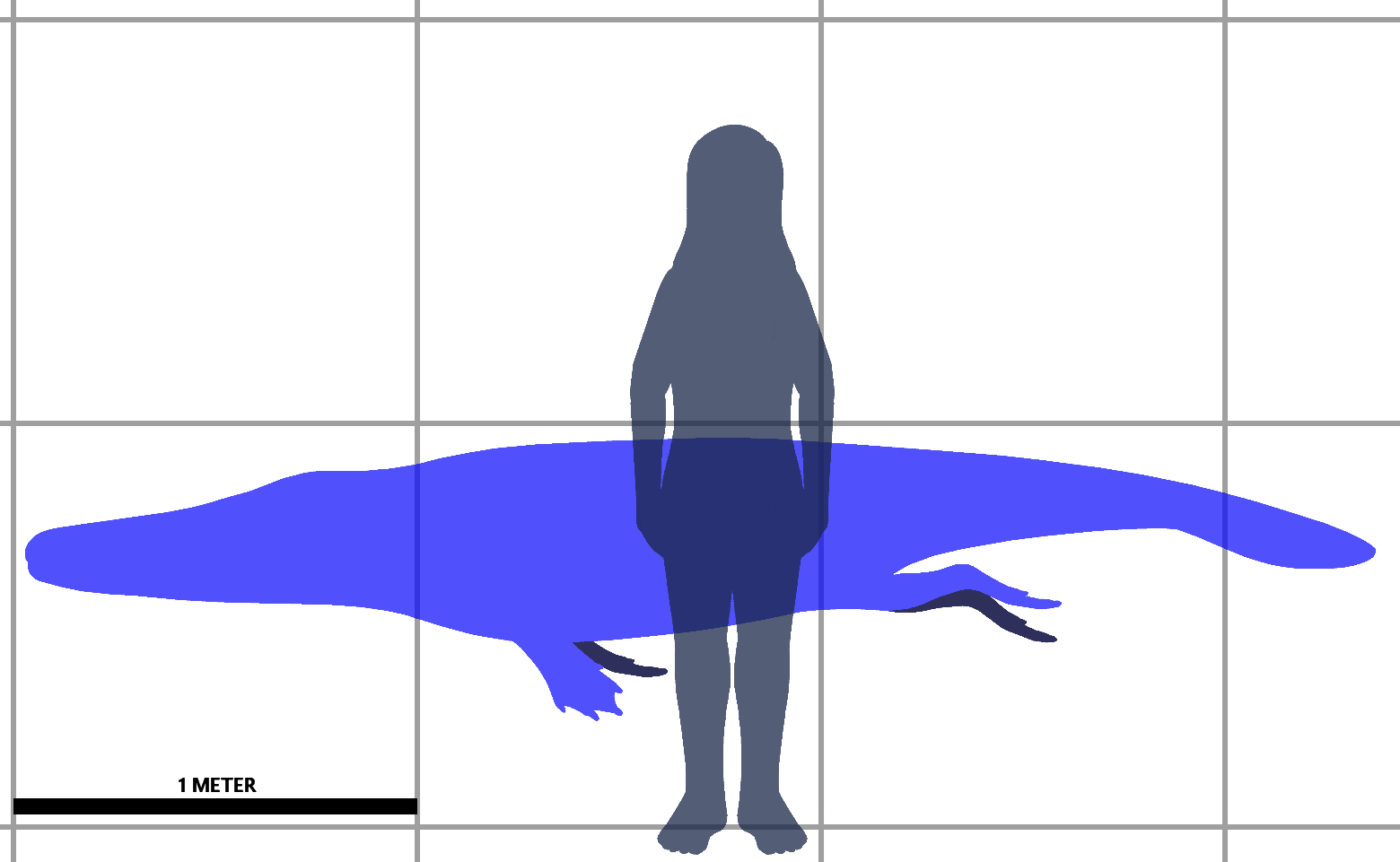
Silhouette showing the size of the holotype.

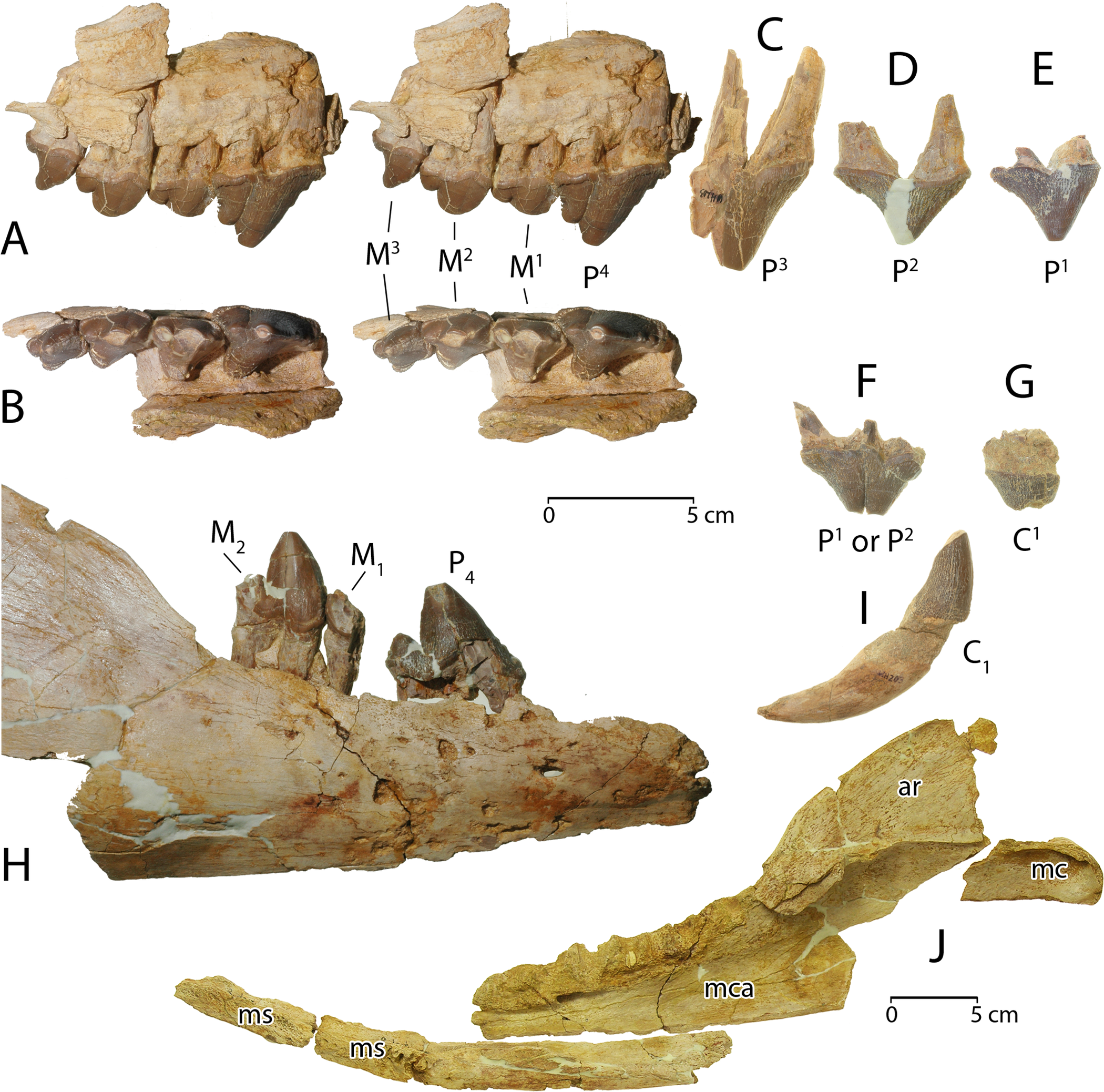
Dentary remains of the holotype.

Aegicetus is a medium-sized whale weighing about 890 kilograms (1,960 lb), and is reported to have been intermediate in form and functionally transitional in having a larger and more powerful vertebral column of a tail-powered swimmer. It differs from Peregocetus by lacking a firm sacroiliac joint and from Rodhocetus by having smaller hind feet, indicating it were less capable of moving on land and relied less on its hind limbs to propel through the water.
