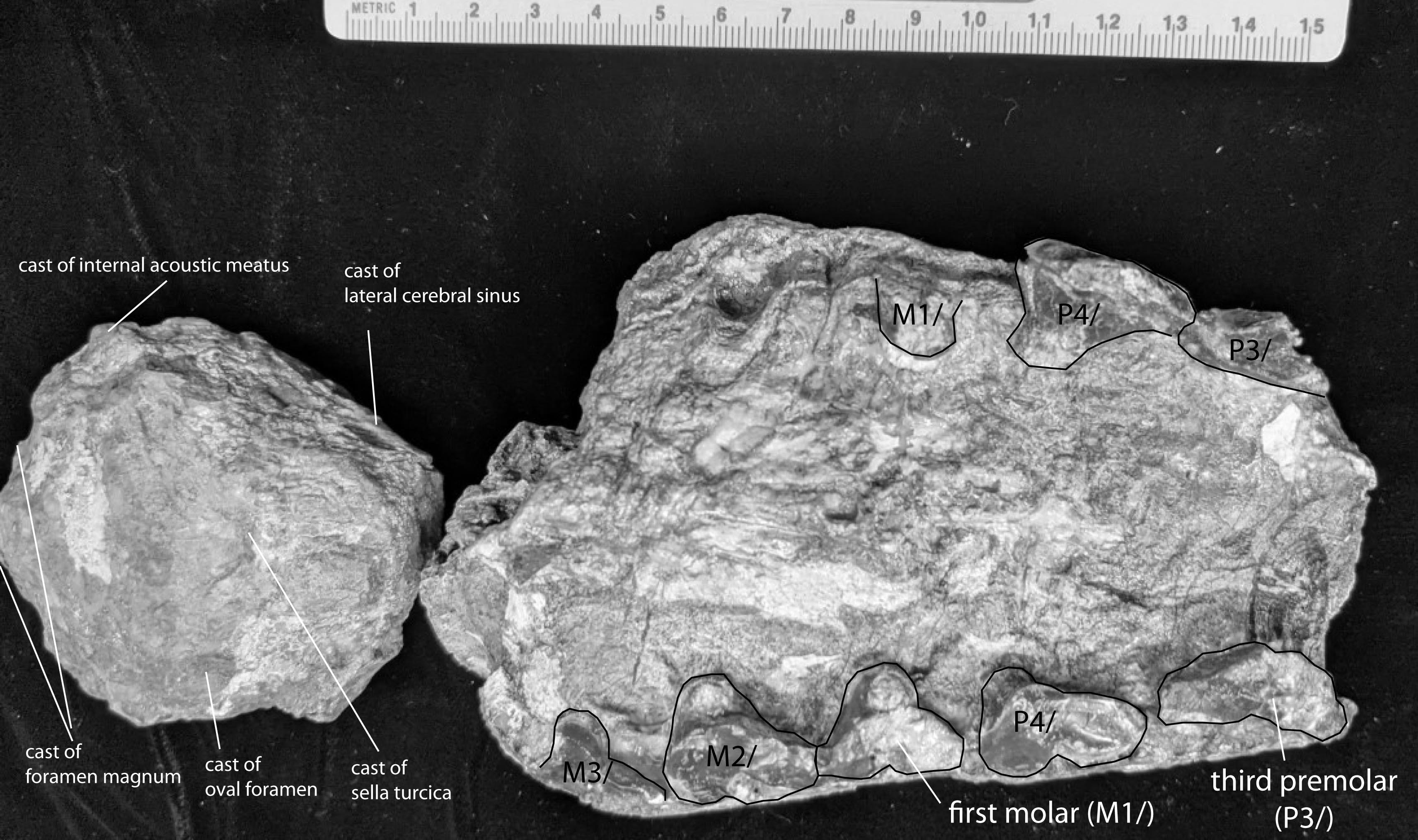
- Holotype skull H-GSP 96232

Scientific classification
- Domain: Eukaryota
- Kingdom: Animalia
- Phylum: Chordata
- Class: Mammalia
- Order: Artiodactyla
- Suborder: Whippomorpha
- Infraorder: Cetacea
- Family: †Remingtonocetidae
- Genus: †Attockicetus; Thewissen & Hussain 2000
- Species: †A. praecursor

Binomial name
- †Attockicetus praecursor Thewissen & Hussain 2000

= Attockicetus =

Attockicetus Temporal range: Eocene 45 Ma

Extinct genus of early whale

Attockicetus is an extinct genus of remingtonocetid early whale known from the Middle Eocene (Lutetian) Kuldana Formation in the Kala Chitta Hills, in the Attock District of Punjab, Pakistan.

Attockicetus is described based on fragmentary cranial material. The holotype specimen, H-GSP 96232, includes a fragmentary rostrum, an endocast (interior of cranium), and an ectotympanic (ear bone). The specimen also had preserved cheek teeth, P^{3}-M^{3}, which is rare in remingtonocetids. Attockicetus is primitive in the retention of large protocones on the upper molars and the location of the orbits anteriorly on the skull. It is probably the most plesiomorphic remingtonocetid.

Additional dental material was found at the type locality and assigned to Attockicetus. Compared to pakicetid teeth found at the same locality, the P_{3} of Attockicetus is much lower, angled anteriorly, and has a very long posterior extension. A long diastema separates P_{3} from P_{4} and P_{3} is longer than P_{4}, which was identified as a remingtonocetid character and, because Attockicetus is the only known remingtonocetid known from the Kala Chitta Hills, they tentatively assigned the specimen as belonging to this genus. The P_{4} of Attockicetus is similar to those of Pakicetus in retaining a tall protoconid (cusp) and anterior and posterior basal extensions with prominent cristae (crests), but differs from them in having steeper protoconid slopes, being taller, and having longer basal extensions. The molar wear in pakicetids is typically extensive, whilst the P_{4} in Attockicetus is less worn, suggesting that the latter was not used for breaking down food, but for holding prey.

== See also ==
- Dentition
