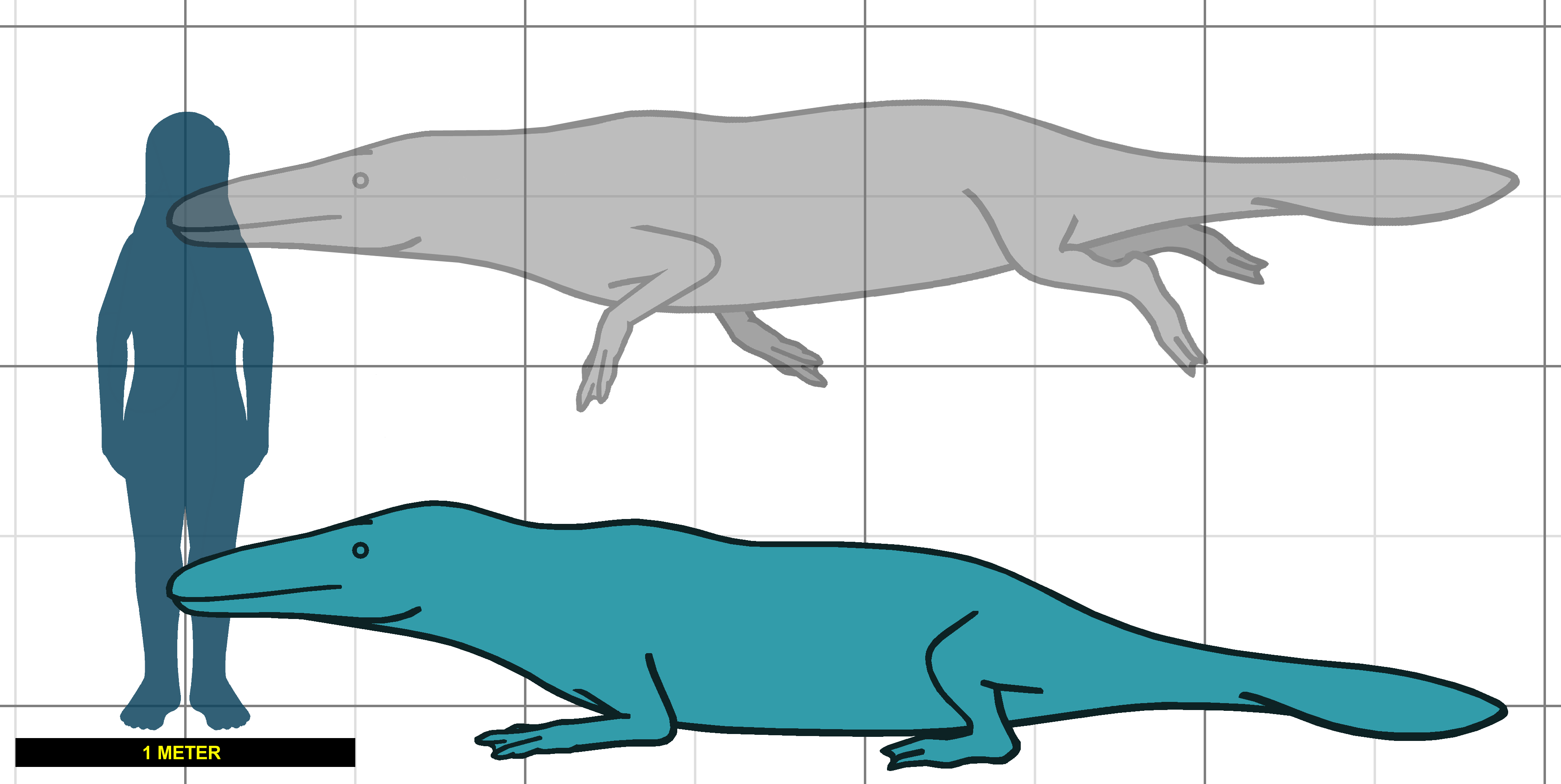
- Size silhouette of Peregocetus compared to a human.

Scientific classification
- Domain: Eukaryota
- Kingdom: Animalia
- Phylum: Chordata
- Class: Mammalia
- Order: Artiodactyla
- Infraorder: Cetacea
- Family: †Protocetidae
- Subfamily: †Protocetinae
- Genus: †Peregocetus; Lambert et al., 2019

Species
- P. pacificus Lambert et al., 2019 (type)

= Peregocetus =

Peregocetus Temporal range: Middle Eocene ~42.6 Ma

Extinct genus of whales

Peregocetus is a genus of early whale that lived in what is now Peru during the Middle Eocene epoch. Its fossil was uncovered in 2011 in the Yumaque Member (Paracas Formation) of the Pisco Basin at Playa Media Luna by a team consisting of members from Belgium, Peru, France, Italy, and the Netherlands. Parts recovered include the jaw, front and hind legs, bits of spine, and tail. Olivier Lambert, a scientist at the Royal Belgian Institute of Natural Sciences and lead author of the study, noted that Peregocetus "fills in a crucial [knowledge] gap" about the evolution of whales and their spread.

Peregocetus is the first recorded quadrupedal whale from the Pacific Ocean and the Southern Hemisphere. The discovery reveals that protocetids reached the Pacific Ocean and attained a near circumequatorial distribution while retaining functional weight-bearing limbs.

== Description ==
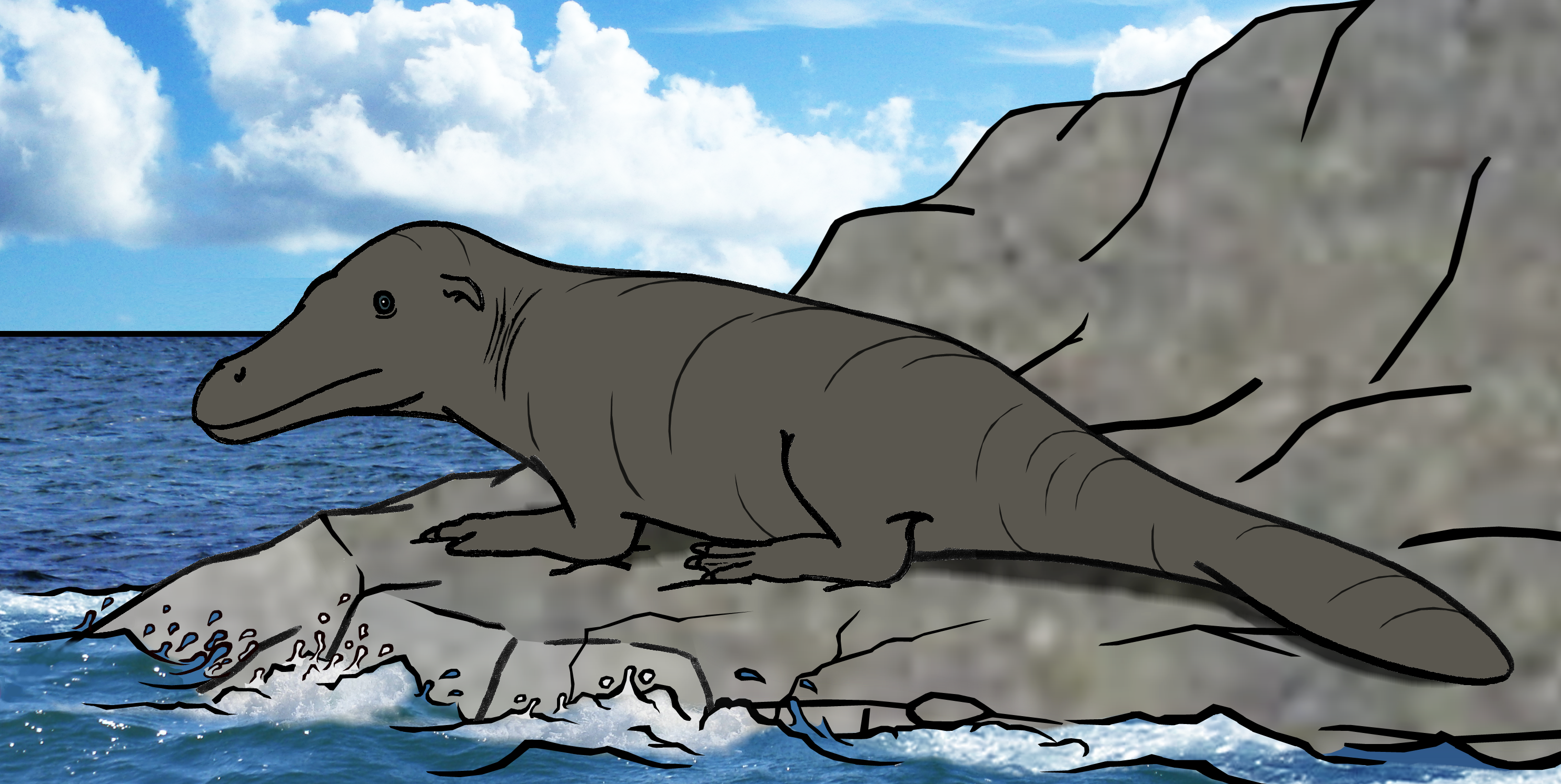
Life restoration of Peregocetus resting at a cliff

Peregocetus was essentially a four-legged whale: however, it had webbed feet with small hooves on the tips of its toes, making it more capable of moving on land than modern seals. It featured sharp teeth and a long snout which suggests it fed on fish and/or crustaceans. From its caudal vertebrae, it has been suggested that it might have possessed a flattened tail similar to a beaver.
