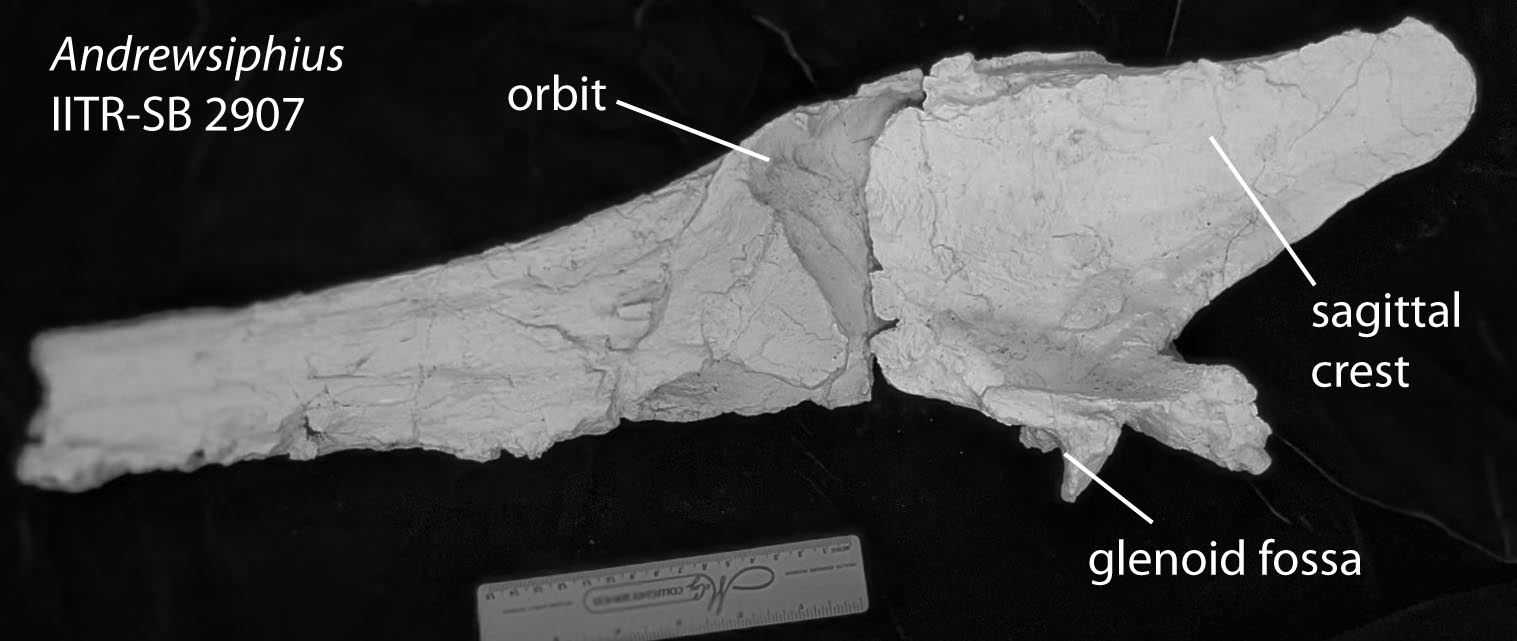
- Skull of Andrewsiphius; specimen IITR-SB 2907

Scientific classification
- Domain: Eukaryota
- Kingdom: Animalia
- Phylum: Chordata
- Class: Mammalia
- Order: Artiodactyla
- Suborder: Whippomorpha
- Infraorder: Cetacea
- Family: †Remingtonocetidae
- Subfamily: †Andrewsiphiinae
- Genus: †Andrewsiphius; Sahni & Mishra 1975
- Species: †A. sloani

Binomial name
- †Andrewsiphius sloani Sahni & Mishra 1972

Synonyms
- Andrewsiphius kutchensis; Andrewsiphius minor; Protocetus kutchensis; Protocetus slaoni; Remingtonocetus sloani

= Andrewsiphius =

Andrewsiphius Temporal range: 47.8–41.2 Ma Lutetian

Extinct remingtonocetid early whale known from the Eocene

Andrewsiphius is an extinct remingtonocetid early whale known from the Eocene (Lutetian, 47.8 to 41.2 million years ago) of Gujarat and Kutch, India and Balochistan, Pakistan.

== Discovery and naming ==
The first specimen was collected by Sahni & Mishra 1972 who described it as mandibular fragments of Protocetus sloani. Sahni & Mishra 1975 described two new species, Andrewsiphius kutchensis and A. minor based on their previous material and new mandibular fragments. Later researchers interpreted the same mandibular specimens as belonging to Remintonocetus.Gingerich et al. 2001 reinterpreted these specimens as fragments from maxillae, and determined that the described "confluence of the mandibular canals anteriorly" was in fact the narial passages. Gingerich et al. also determined that the variations in size among proposed species were within the normal variation for a single species and therefore attributed a number of referred specimens as belonging to Andrewsiphius sloani.

Gingerich et al. also noted that the type specimen of Kutchicetus minimus came from the same locality as A. sloani and that its distinctive small size was within the variation that could be expected for A. sloani, and Gingerich et al. therefore included K. minimus into A. sloani. Later authors, however, disagreed on this assignment and Kutchicetus is still accepted as a separate genus.

Sahni & Mishra 1972 named the type species for Dr Robert E. Sloan, Department of Geology, University of Minnesota.

== Description ==
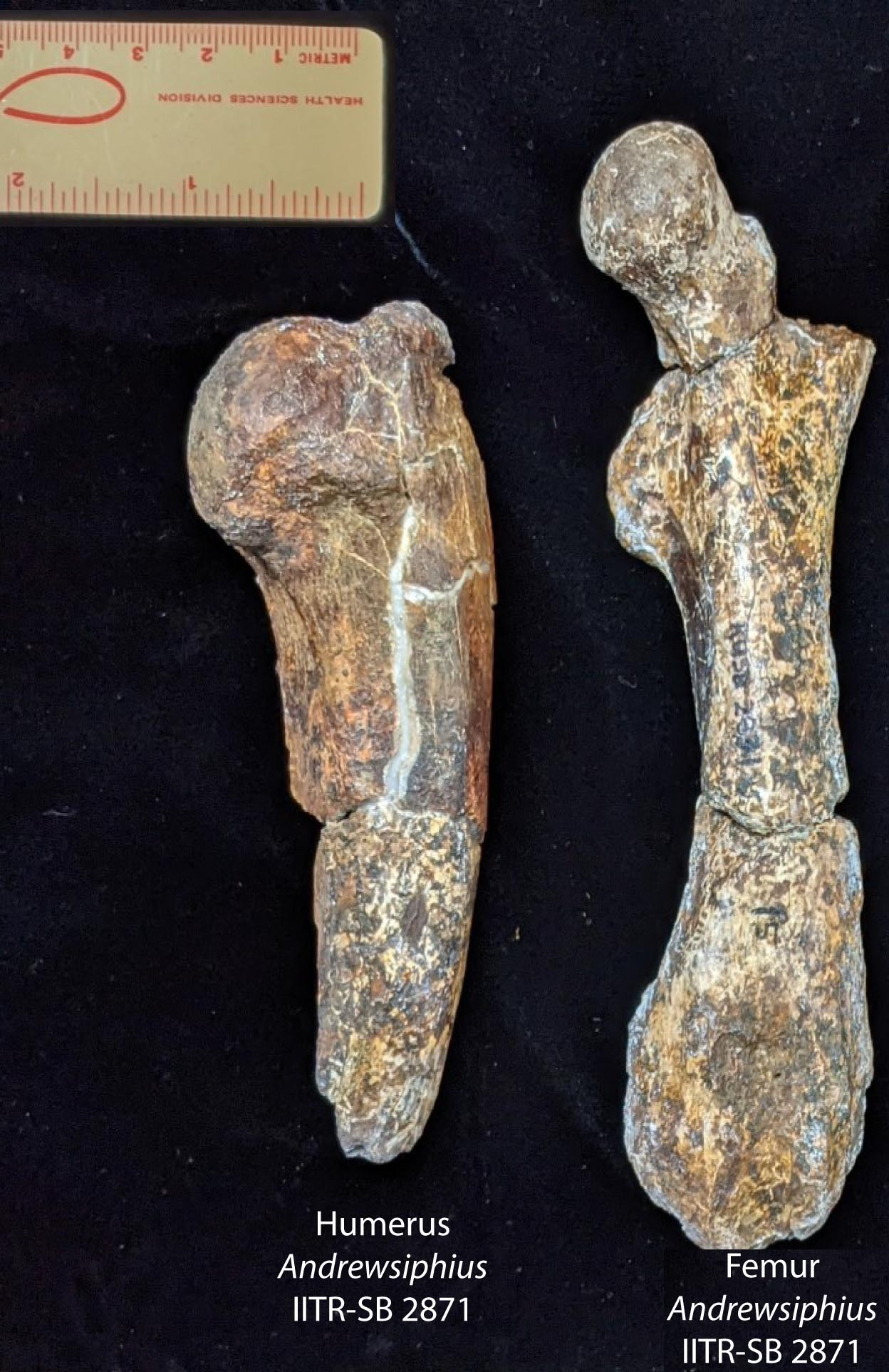
Humerus and femur of Andrewsiphius

Andrewsiphius is similar to but smaller than Kutchicetus (another remingtonocetid); Gingerich et al. 2001 synonymized them, and Thewissen & Bajpai 2009 proposed a new subfamily, Andrewsiphiinae, for the two species. Later authors, however, still accept both as separate genera.

Andrewsiphius and Kutchicetus share several characteristics not present in other remingtonocetids: an elongated snout that is higher than it is wide; foramina (small holes) on the tip of the snout suggesting the presence of whiskers; eyes located dorsally near the cranial midline, resulting in an appearance of a mammalian crocodile; and a very large sagittal crest overhanging the back of the skull. Other characteristics make them distinct: the second and third upper and lower premolars are double-rooted in Andrewsiphius but single-rooted in Kutchicetus; the large diastemata in the former are absent the latter; and the tail vertebrae are more robust in Andrewsiphius.

Andrewsiphius is, compared to the remgintonocetids Remingtonocetus and Dalanistes, smaller, has a narrower rostrum, and smaller premolars separated by longer diastemata.
