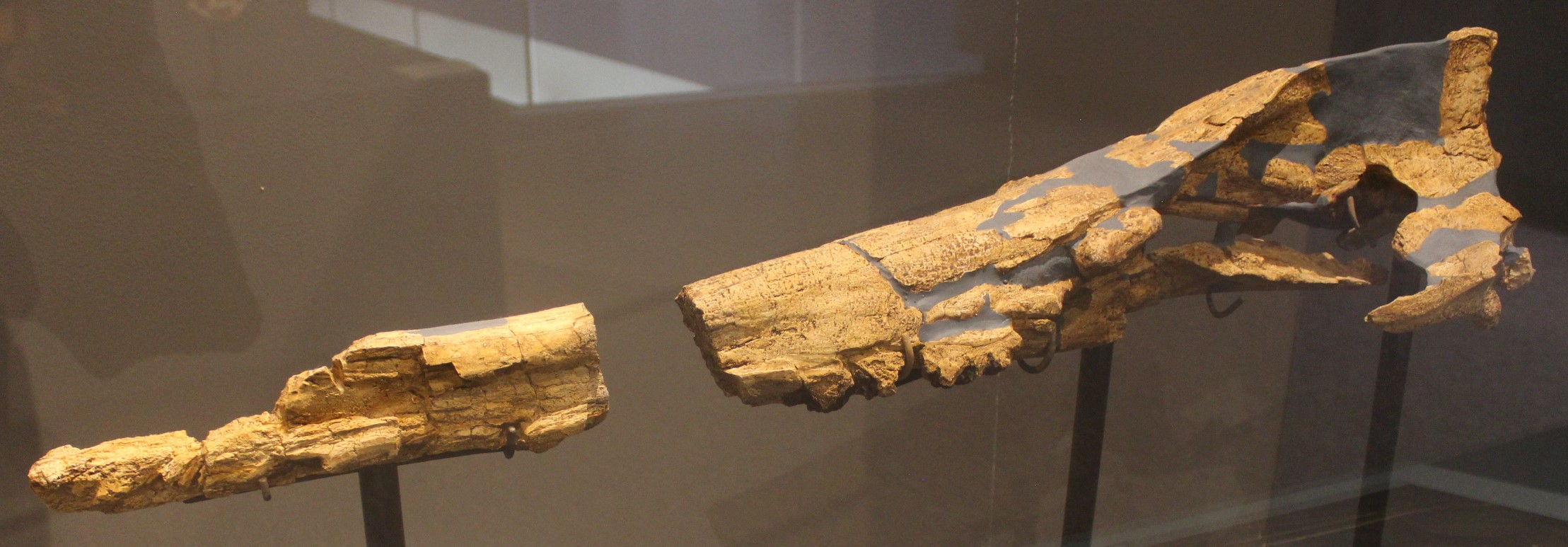
- Cast of holotype skull (GSM-UM 3106), University of Michigan Museum of Natural History

Scientific classification
- Domain: Eukaryota
- Kingdom: Animalia
- Phylum: Chordata
- Class: Mammalia
- Order: Artiodactyla
- Infraorder: Cetacea
- Family: †Remingtonocetidae
- Genus: †Dalanistes; Gingerich, Arif & Clyde 1995

Species
- †D. ahmedi

= Dalanistes =

Dalanistes Temporal range: Eocene, 48.6–40.4 Ma

Species of mammal (fossil)

Dalanistes is an extinct genus of remingtonocetid early whale known from the late-early Eocene (Lutetian, 48.6 to 40.4 million years ago) of Kutch, India and Punjab and Balochistan, Pakistan. Dalanistes is closely related to Remingtonocetus (the type genus of Remingtonocetidae, a slightly more derived family of early whales), but also shares several features with Ambulocetus (the type of Ambulocetidae, earlier more primitive whales), and, with its combination of terrestrial and amphibious adaptations, Dalanistes apparently is an intermediate form between these two groups. Isotopic evidence suggest that Dalanistes had a marine diet.

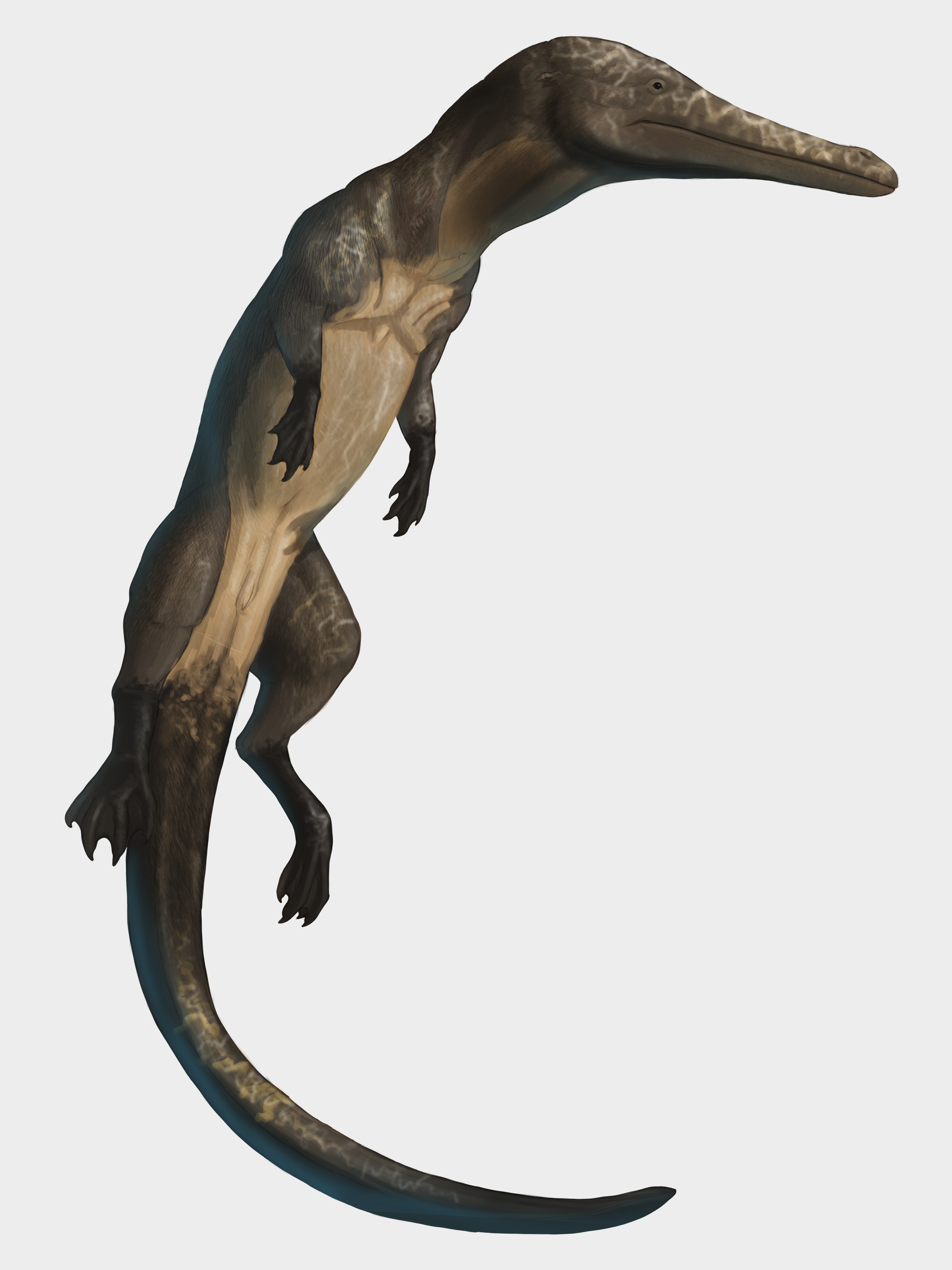
Life restoration

Dalanistes is known from several localities and collections. The holotype is a skull and a postcranial skeleton. Additional fossils referred to Dalanistes include crania, several vertebrae and sacra, possible caudals, one side of the pelvis, and a distal femur. The alveoli is all that is left of the dentition, but the dental formula apparently was 3.1.4.33.1.4.3.

The vertebral elements of the sacrum are solidly fused and form a well-developed articular surface for the pelvis. The ilium is robust and long, and has a large acetabulum similar to that in Remingtonocetus. The femur had a spherical head, a medial condyle considerably larger than the lateral, and a shallow patellar groove. Taken together this morphology suggests the presence of well-developed hind limbs.

Dalanistes was a small whale weighing 574–750 kg (1,265–1,653 lb). It was similar to but 20% larger than Remingtonocetus; the external nares are located more anteriorly (above C^{1}); the sagittal crest is much higher; the rostrum is angled down 20° relative to the main axis of the braincase; the mandibular symphysis is relatively open (ends at P_{3}) and the mandibular canals fail to unite at the symphysis. This mandibular morphology is also different from that of Andrewsiphius (another remingtonocetid).

Dalanistes was named by contracting "Dalana" and "-istes" to allude to the Greek name platanistes used for (unrelated) South Asian river dolphin. Both the genus and species name refer to local place names near the type locality: Dalana Nala and Basti Ahmed, respectively.

== See also ==
- Evolution of cetaceans
