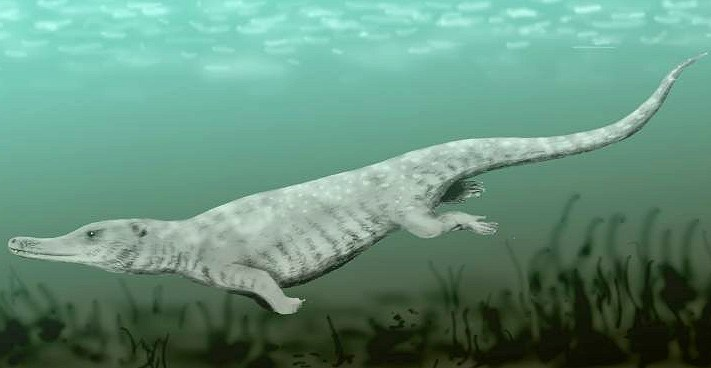
- Life restoration of R. harudiniensis

Scientific classification
- Kingdom: Animalia
- Phylum: Chordata
- Class: Mammalia
- Order: Artiodactyla
- Infraorder: Cetacea
- Family: †Remingtonocetidae
- Genus: †Remingtonocetus; Kumar & Sahni 1986

Type species
- †Protocetus harudiensis Sahni & Mishra 1975

Species
- R. harudiensis Sahni & Mishra 1975; R. domandaensis Gingerich et al. 2001

= Remingtonocetus =

Remingtonocetus Temporal range: Middle Eocene, 45–43.5 Ma

Genus of mammals

Remingtonocetus is an extinct genus of early cetacean freshwater aquatic mammals of the family Remingtonocetidae endemic to the coastline of the ancient Tethys Ocean during the Eocene. It was named after naturalist Remington Kellogg.

== History of discovery ==
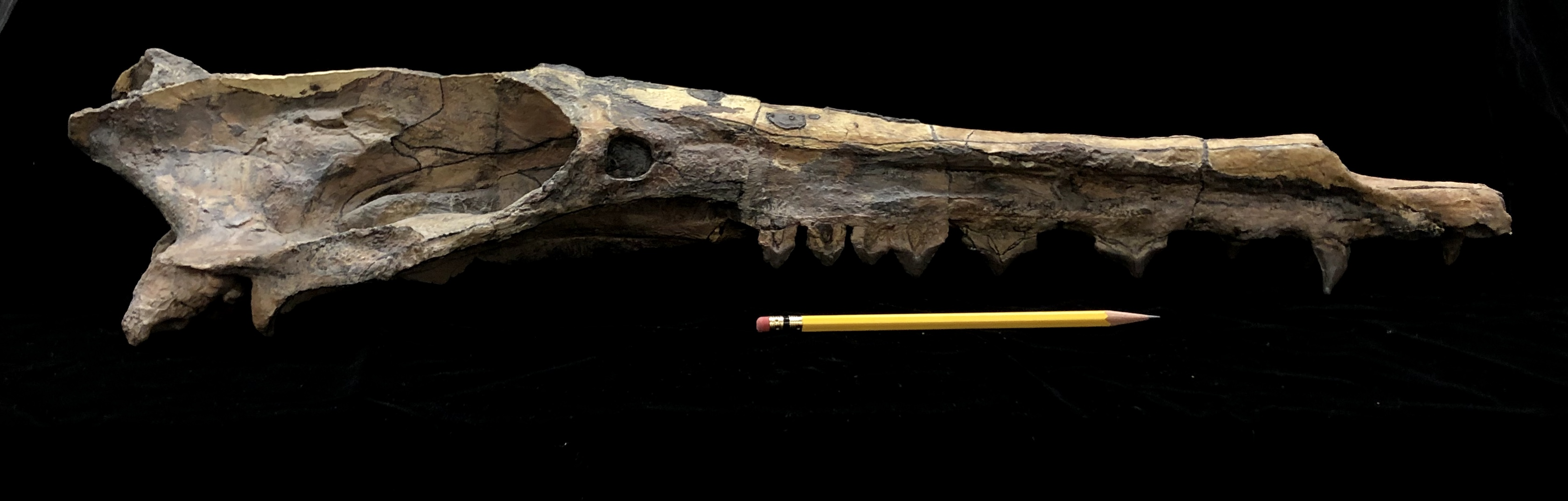
Skull from Remingtonocetus harudiensis (cast of specimen IITR-SB 2770)

Sahni & Mishra 1975 named Protocetus harudiensis based on a partial skeleton, the type specimen found in the Lutetian shallow subtidal mudstone in the Harudi Formation, India. Kumar & Sahni 1986 renamed it Remingtononocetus harudiensis due to morphological differences from Protocetus.

Remingtonocetus domandaensis was named by Gingerich et al. 2001 based on a partial skeleton found in a Lutetian coastal shale in the Domanda Formation of Pakistan. Remingtonocetus is larger, has a broader rostrum, and longer premolars than Andrewsiphius. It is smaller than, has more gracile premolars and molars than Dalanistes. R. harudiensis differs from R. domandaensis in molar morphology.

== Description ==
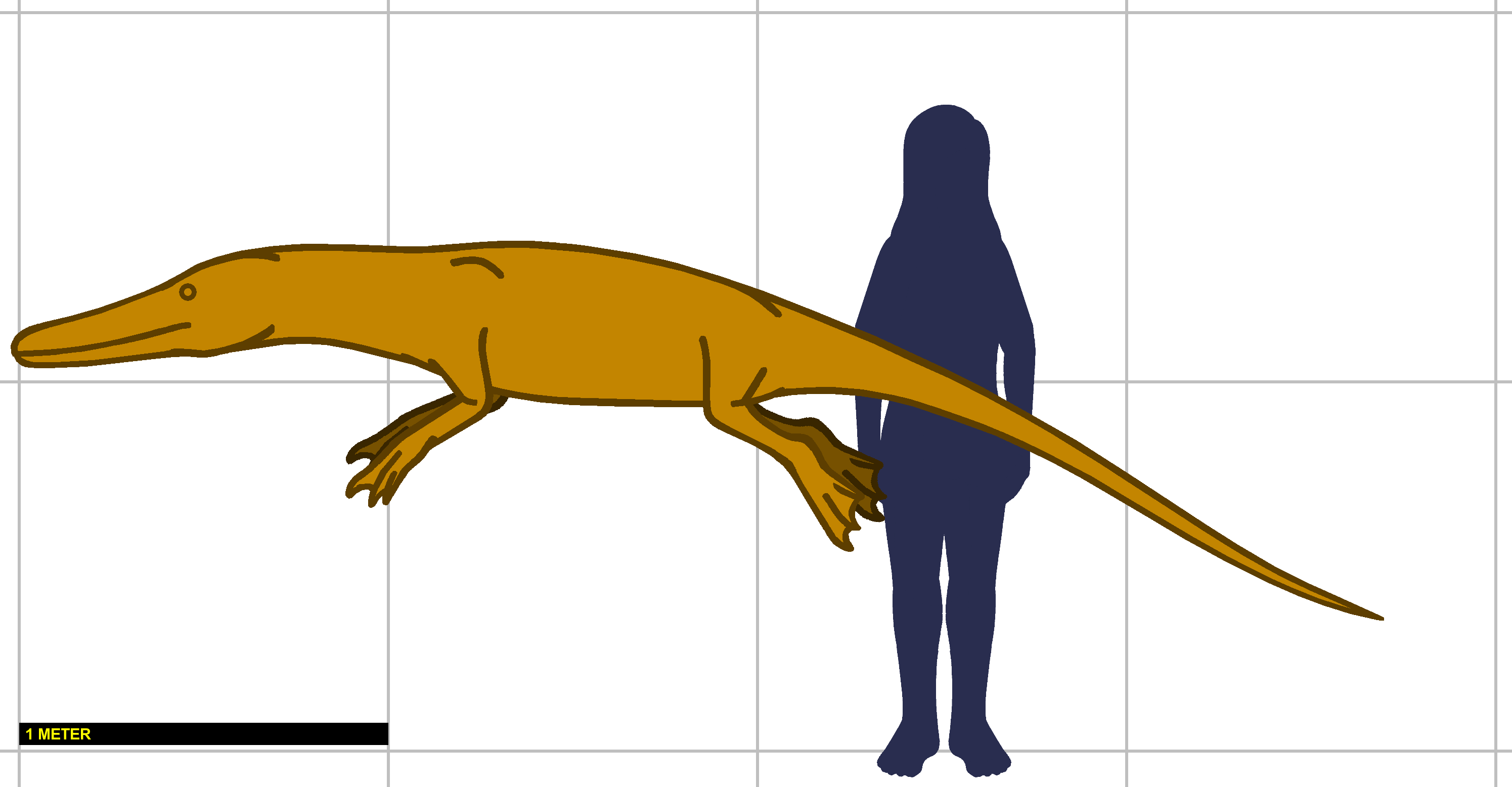
Drawing showing the size of Remingtonocetus (scale in meters)

Remingtonocetus was a small cetacean with R. harudiensis weighing 198–576 kg (437–1,270 lb). Gingerich et al. 2001 interpreted R. domandaensis as an older and more generalized species than R. harudiensis. Based on a morphological analysis, they concluded that the hindlimbs of Remingtonocetus were probably not weight-bearing, and that (1) the fused sacrum indicates a limitation in tail-powered locomotion, and (2) the presence of powerful hip extensors and femoral adductors indicates that Remingtonocetus was an efficient and specialized foot-powered swimmer.

Remingtonocetus had four working and usable limbs, a slender whale-like body with long tail and slender, hydrodynamic head.

== Taxonomy ==
Remingtonocetus was named by Kumar & Sahni 1986. Its type is Protocetus harudiensis. It was considered monophyletic by Uhen et al. 2011. It was assigned to Cetacea by Sepkoski 2002. To Remingtonocetidae by Kumar & Sahni 1986, Gingerich & Russell 1990, Benton 1993, McKenna & Bell 1997, Bajpai & Thewissen 1998, Williams 1998, Thewissen et al. 2001, Gingerich et al. 2001, Geisler & Sanders 2003, McLeod & Barnes 2008 and Uhen et al. 2011.

== See also ==
- Evolution of cetaceans
