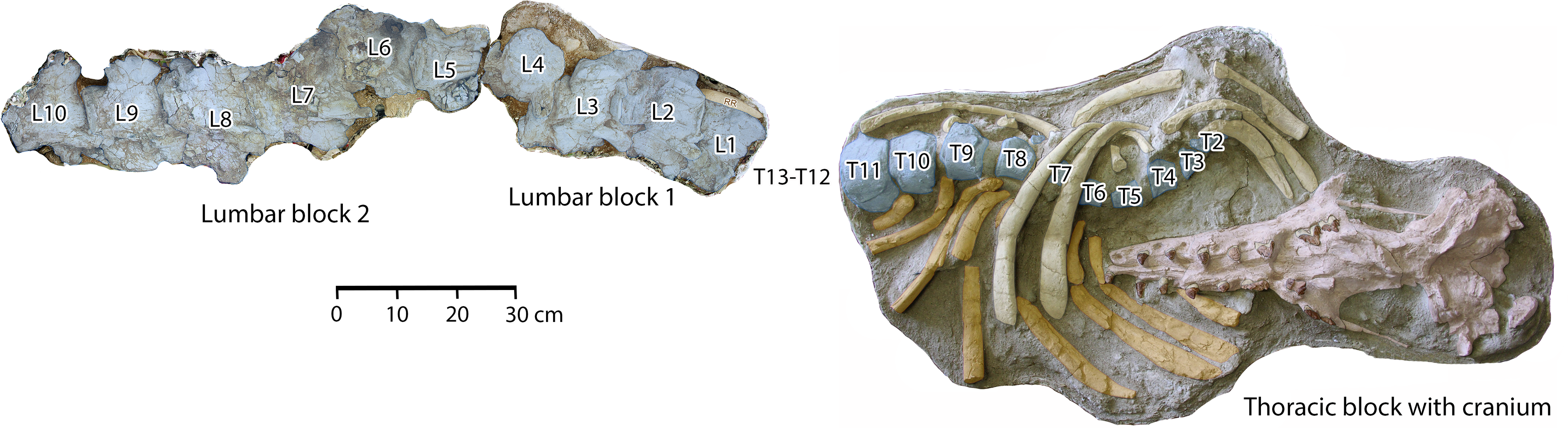
- Skeletal material of Antaecetus aithai
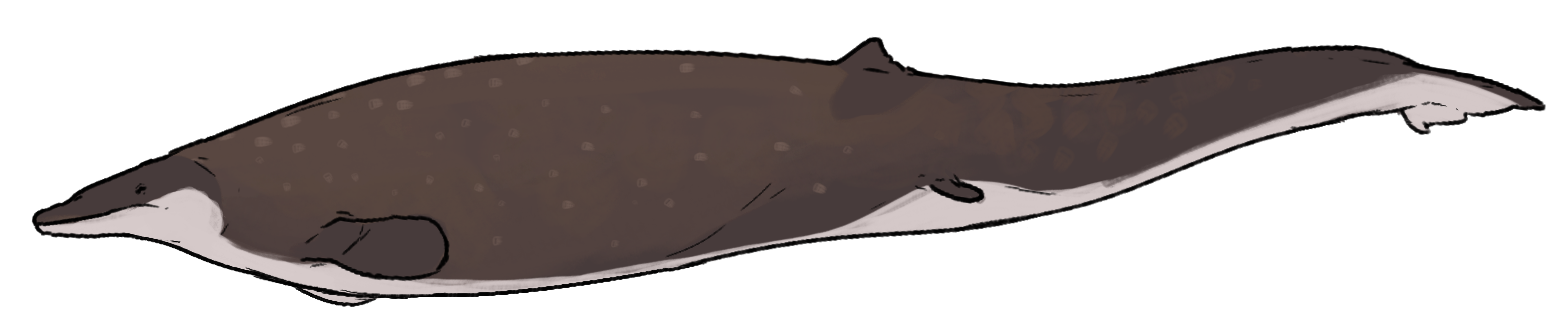
- Life restoration of Pachycetus paulsonii

Scientific classification
- Kingdom: Animalia
- Phylum: Chordata
- Class: Mammalia
- Infraclass: Placentalia
- Order: Artiodactyla
- Infraorder: Cetacea
- Family: †Basilosauridae
- Subfamily: †Pachycetinae; Gingerich, Amane, & Zouhri, 2022

Genera
- Antaecetus; Pachycetus; Supayacetus?

= Pachycetinae =

Pachycetinae Temporal range: Bartonian Though the best-dated remains are Bartonian in age, some could suggest its presence during the Lutetian and Priabonian.

Subfamily of mammals

Pachycetinae is an extinct subfamily of basilosaurid cetaceans that lived during the middle Eocene. The best-dated remains stem from Bartonian strata, but some finds suggest that they could have first appeared during the Lutetian and may have survived until the Priabonian. Fossils of pachycetines are chiefly known from the southern United States, Ukraine, Morocco and Germany, among others. They differ from other basilosaurids in having pachyostotic and osteosclerotic vertebrae and ribs, making them denser and heavier by comparison. Based on this it has been suggested that these whales lived in shallow waters and that these thickened bones act as a buoyancy control as seen in sirenians. Analysis of the teeth suggests that pachycetines had a varying diet, with the robust teeth of the larger Pachycetus indicating that it possibly fed on sharks, whereas the more gracile teeth of Antaecetus suggest a diet of smaller prey items. The clade currently only includes two genera, Antaecetus and Pachycetus, but a 2023 study suggests that the Peruvian Supayacetus may at least be a close relative.

== History of discovery ==
Pachycetines have a long history of research on a genus level, even though the family itself was only named in the early 2020s. This is primarily due to the taxonomic confusion and nomenclatural changes surrounding the genera Platyosphys and Pachycetus, both of which trace their origins to fossils discovered during the late 19th century. The earliest finds were recovered from Ukraine and named Zeuglodon paulsonii by Johann Friedrich Brandt. Around the same time, Harry Govier Seeley named poorly preserved remains from the Barton Clay of Great Britain Zeuglodon wanklyni while Pierre-Joseph Van Beneden coined the name Pachycetus for fossil remains from Germany which he thought belonged to a mysticete. Recognizing at least two morphotypes, van Beneden suggested that they belonged to two distinct but related species which he named Pachycetus robustus and Pachycetus humilis.

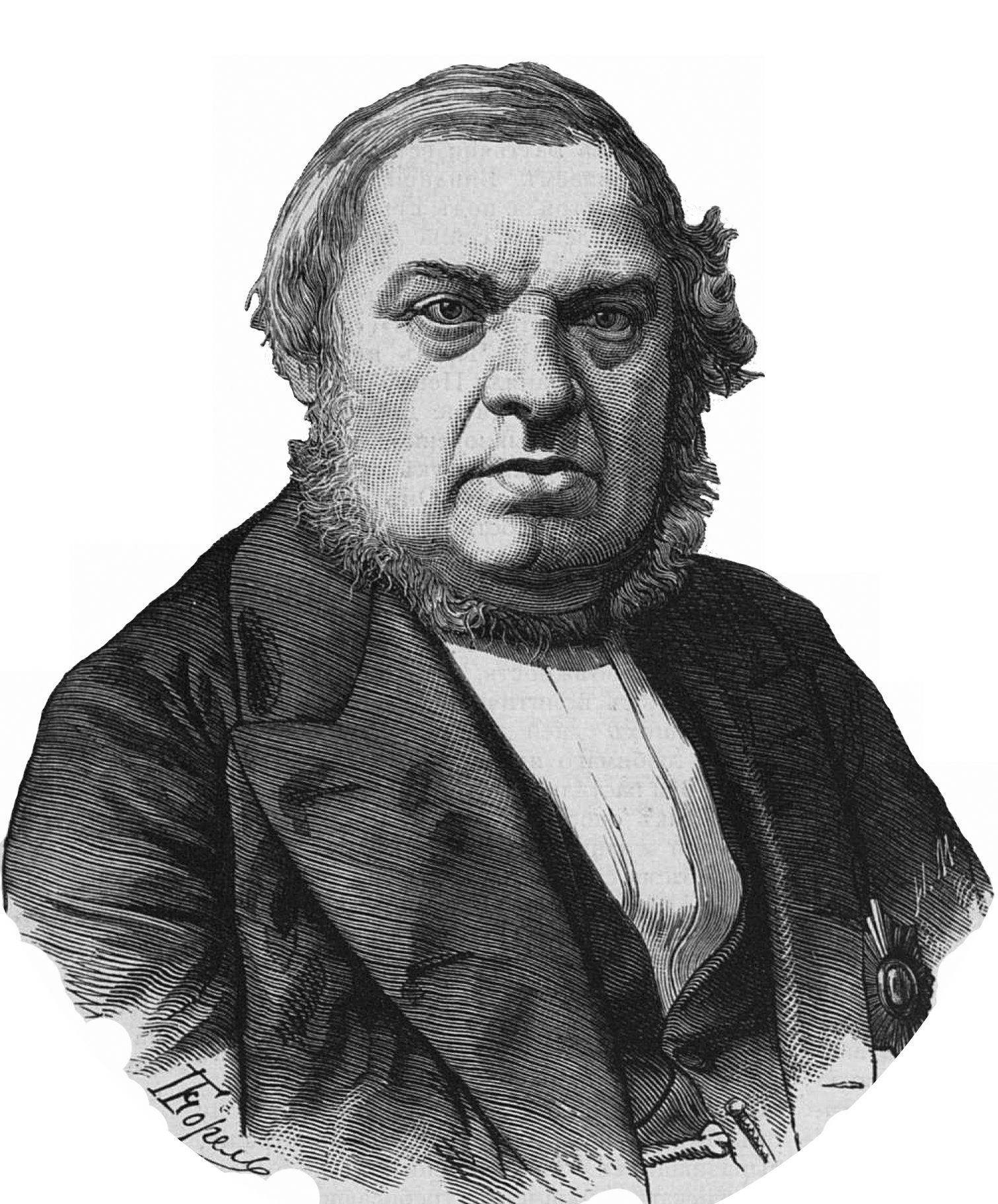
Johann Friedrich Brandt was among the first to describe pachycetine material.

The German remains were eventually recognized as having belonged to archaeocetes. However, Oskar Kuhn rejected the idea that they represented a distinct genus, instead drawing comparisons to Zeuglodon isis (Basilosaurus) and Zeuglodon osiris (Saghacetus). Only a year later, in 1936, Remington Kellogg published an extensive monograph on fossil archaeocetes, including the "Zeuglodon" remains from Ukraine. In this publication, he argued for the fossil material to be distinct on a genus level, coining the name Platyosphys. Things largely went quiet around both the German and the Ukrainian remains in the following 70 years, with Pachycetus slipping into obscurity and Platyosphys likewise receiving little attention.

Research somewhat picked up again towards the end of the 20th century and the early 2000s. In 1999 Mark D. Uhen described Eocetus wardii based on cranial and postcranial remains from the eastern United States, believing that the material represented a type of protocetid, archaeocetes even more basal than basilosaurids, although subsequent research repeatedly disagreed on this matter, arguing that the fossils could not be assigned to Eocetus. In 2001 more material from Europe was described, this time under the name Platyosphys einori. With more material coming out of Ukraine, the status of Platyosphys was reexamined in a more critical light. With the holotype presumably lost sometime during WW2, Pavel Gol'din and Evgenij Zvonok argued that Platyosphys should be considered a nomen dubium given the lack of material to compare more recent finds with. To compensate for this, they erected the genus Basilotritus to include much of the Platyosphys material previously discovered. At the same time, they noted that Uhen's "Eocetus" wardii was remarkably similar, referring the species to Basilotritus as well. Platyosphys einori on the other hand was dismissed as being too fragmentary and undiagnostic to be referred to anything more specific than the family Basilosauridae.

While this would have provided a more accessible basis for future referrals, the proposition was not unanimously accepted by other researchers, with some later publications highlighting the fact that a missing holotype alone is not enough reason to disregard the use of Platyosphys. Supporters of this line of thinking argue that the illustrations provided by Brandt and later authors are sufficient in diagnosing and comparing the material to more recent finds, therefore maintaining the validity of Platyosphys. Two of the researchers remarking on the matter, Phillip D. Gingerich and Samir Zhouri, subsequently question the validity of P. uheni (alongside that of the poorly preserved P. einori) while naming a species of their own: Platyosphys aithai.

The name Pachycetus eventually returned to prominence in 2020, when Henk Jan van Vliet and his colleagues noticed the similarities between the German remains and those of Platyosphys, lumping the two genera into a single taxon. This effectively left them with five species: P. paulsonii, P. robustus, P. wardii, P. uheni and P. aithai. Pachycetus paulsonii became a new combination and was recognized as the type species, combining the older species' name with the older genus name following their respective priority. While the idea that both P. paulsonii and P. robustus could have been entirely synonymous was entertained, the limited material available for the latter effectively rendered a thorough comparison impossible. For this reason, P. robustus was retained, if only for a single vertebra and rib fragment. P. uheni, P. aithai and P. wardii were carried over as per the works of Gol'din and Zvonok as well as Gingerich and Zhouri. P. einori, whose validity had already come to be questioned by Gol'din and Zvonok as well as Gingerich and Zhouri, was not mentioned in their work.

The most recent changes made to the taxonomy of pachycetines came in 2022 with another paper authored by Gingerich. In it, both Pachycetus robustus and Pachycetus uheni were fully integrated into Pachycetus paulsonii, meaning that all material from continental Europe was now placed within a single species. The North African remains, previously named Pachycetus aithai, were split off and assigned to their own genus based on the discovery of additional remains. With this new genus, dubbed Antaecetus, clearly distinct from yet also similar to Pachycetus proper, the team further went on to create a new subfamily to house the two genera. This led to the establishment of Pachycetinae. Finally, Seeley's remains of "Zeuglodon" wanklyni were hypothesized to either represent an additional third species of Pachycetus or simply another instance of P. paulsonii.

== Species ==
Genus	Species	Age	Location	Notes	Image
Antaecetus	Antaecetus aithai	Bartonian	Morocco Egypt	The best preserved and most recently described pachycetine, Antaecetus differs from Pachycetus in having an overall smaller body size, more gracile teeth and a smaller skull in proportion to the body.	Antaecetus close up
Pachycetus	Pachycetus paulsonii	Bartonian	Ukraine Germany Russia	Pachycetus paulsonii is known from across Europe but is not well understood due to the often isolated nature of the fossil finds. It is the largest pachycetine.	Pachycetus paulsoni
Pachycetus	Pachycetus wardii	Bartonian	USA	A smaller species of Pachycetus, P. wardii is known exclusively from the eastern United States. It was originally thought to be part of the genus Eocetus.	Pachycetus paulsoni

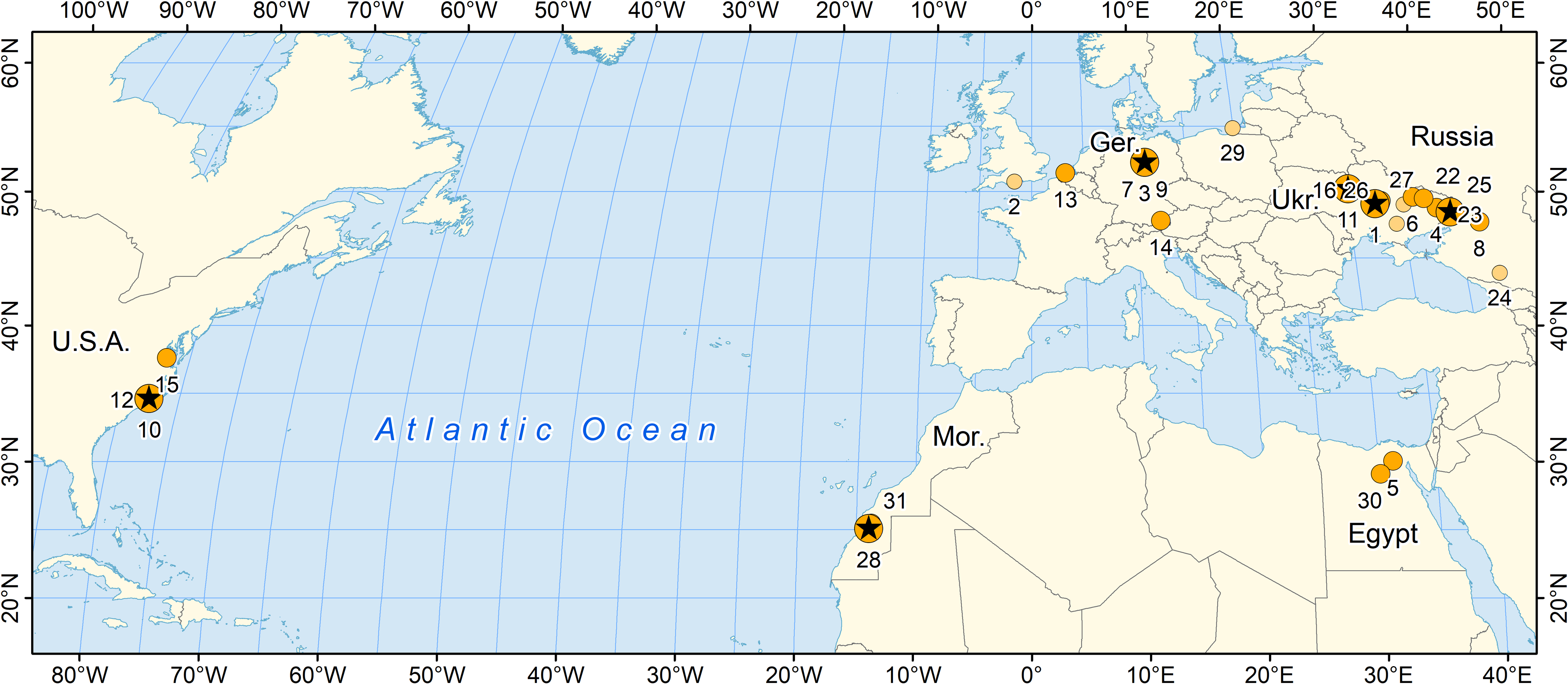
A map of localities that have yielded pachycetine fossils.

Across the long research history, a variety of other species have been named, but few are still regarded as valid species. Pachycetus humilis, the second of the two original Pachycetus species, is now thought to be a distinct archaeocete. Platyosphys einori was based on highly fragmentary remains, which were later determined to have been too poorly preserved to allow assignment beyond a family level. Subsequently, Platyosphys einori is now simply regarded as Basilosauridae incertae sedis. Pachycetus uheni (the type species of Basilotritus) is regarded as a potential synonym of Pachycetus paulsonii.

Things are slightly different for "Zeuglodon" wanklyni, which has never been formally included under Pachycetus but may represent an additional species according to Gingerich, Amane and Zhouri. Alternatively, it may not be distinct and instead could simply expand the range of Pachycetus paulsonii to also include the UK. Smaller specimens of Pachycetus are also known from isolated remains collected in Spain and the North Sea off the coast of Belgium and the Netherlands, though their fragmentary nature means that it is uncertain whether or not they represent distinct species.

== Description ==
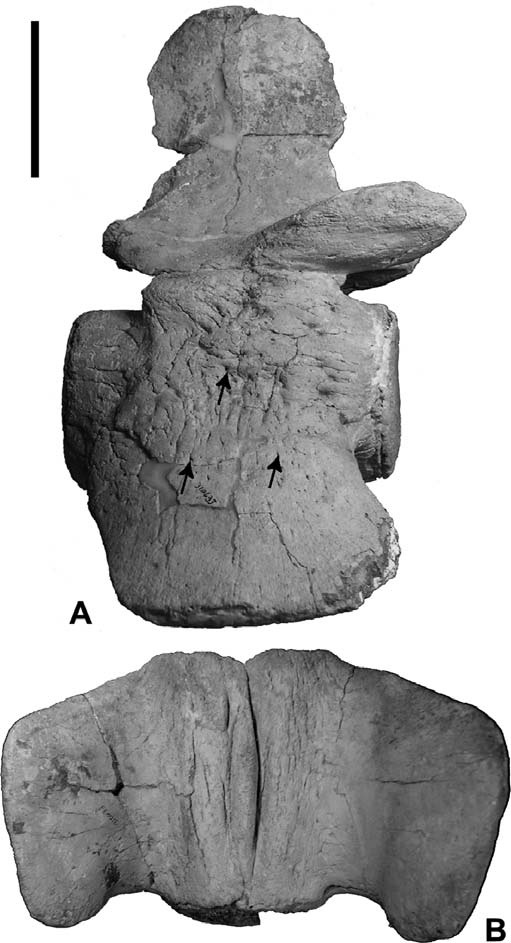
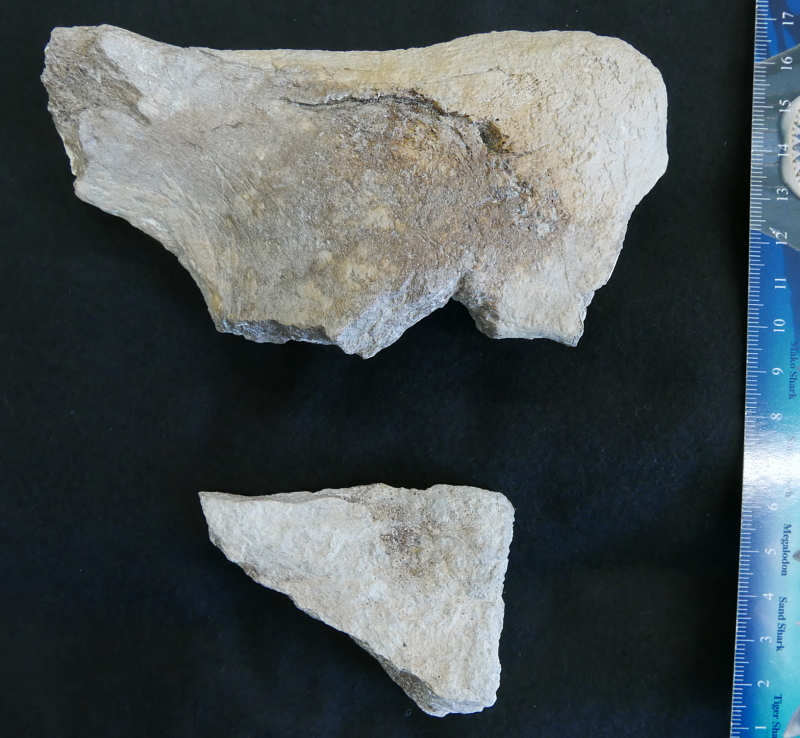
Fossil vertebrae (left) and innominate fragments (right) of Pachycetus wardii.

The most distinct feature of pachycetines, and the one they derive their name from, is the density of their skeleton. The vertebrae and ribs of pachycetines are both pachyostotic and osteosclerotic. Pachoystosis describes the condition of the cortical bone forming thickened layers, which are prominent in the vertebrae and ribs of pachycetines. In the ribs in particular, the pachyostosis occurs around the middle of the bone, with cancellous bone being restricted to two cones, with the narrowest points facing each other. The fact that the cancellous bone took on a cone shape was originally noted to be distinct to pachycetines, but later studies argued that this condition is much more widespread across basilosaurids and not diagnostic. While pachyostosis describes a thickening of the cortical bone, osteosclerosis means that the cortical bone is much denser compared to the same structure in other whales, and contains fewer porosities. Overall these skeletal features have been compared to members of Sirenia, a group that includes the modern dugong and manatees. The density of the skeleton is at least somewhat increased by the articulation between the spine and the ribs as well. In pachycetines, the ribs are thought to connect to the vertebrae not through synovial articulation but through ligaments or cartilage.

Another notable feature of the vertebrae is how the thoracic vertebrae rapidly increase in size, with individual bones appearing trapezoid in shape due to how much larger the posterior surface is relative to the beginning of the element. The lumbar vertebrae, which follow those of the thorax, are highly elongated, a trait shared by basilosaurines. Unlike basilosaurines however, the transverse processes that emerge from the sides of the vertebrae are nearly as elongated as the vertebral centra themselves. The surface of the bones is littered with numerous vascular canals, which give them a distinct pattern described as "pitted" or "pockmarked" by researchers.

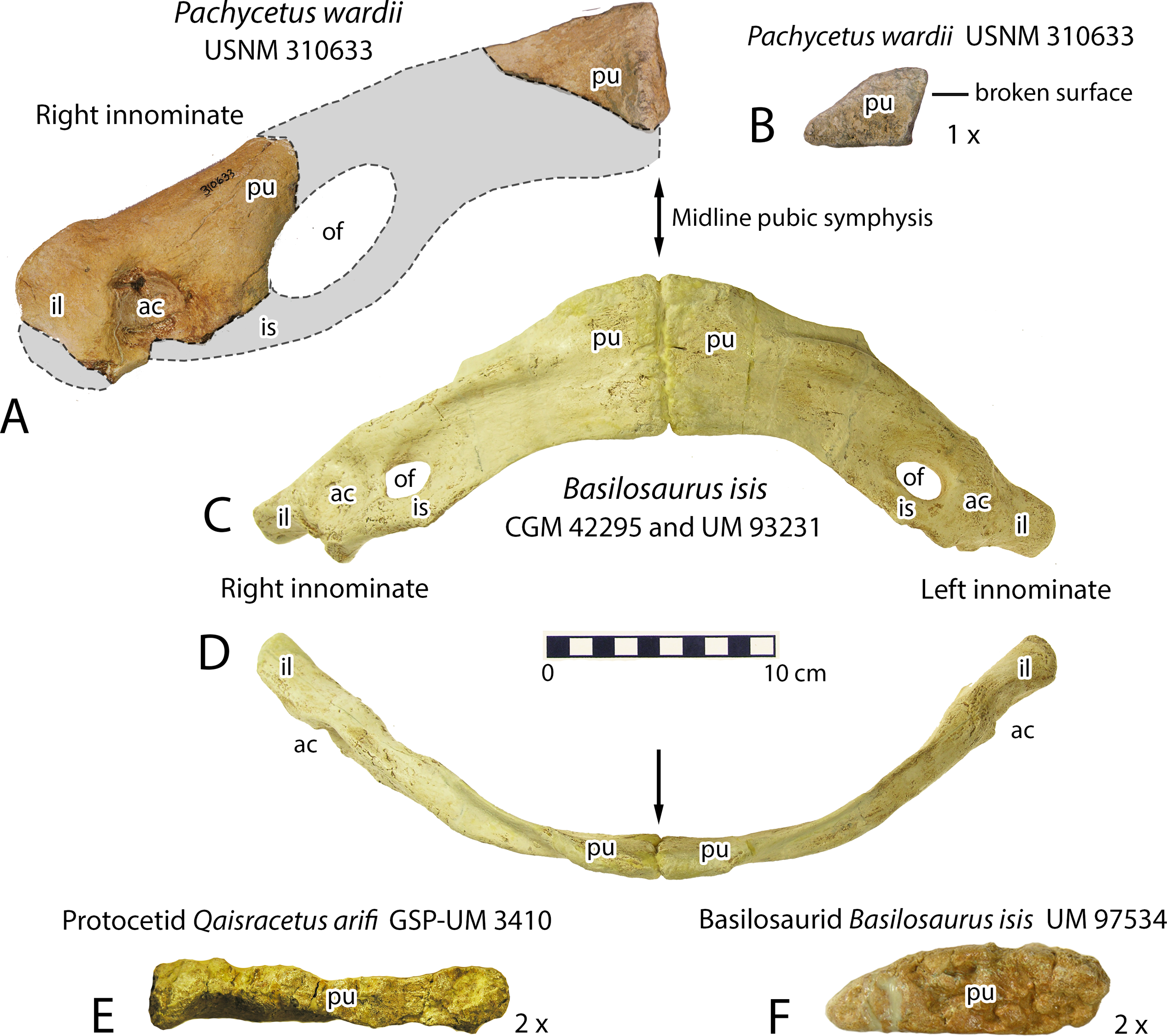
The innominate bones of various basilosaurids.

The only innominate bone known from a pachycetine is that of Pachycetus wardii, which appears to show a much more basal condition than that of other basilosaurids and features a much larger obturator foramen.

No clear size estimates for the various pachycetines have been published, but several papers mention their size relative to other basilosaurids. Both species of Pachycetus are described as larger than Antaecetus, with P. paulsonii being notably larger than P. wardii. Antaecetus has been described as "medium-sized" and slightly smaller than P. wardii. It's said to be similar in size to the large protocetid Pappocetus with a skull that is the same size as that of Saghacetus.

== Phylogeny ==
Historically, pachycetines were typically regarded as basilosaurids, with some older publications using the antiquated term zeuglodonts. Though this broader relationship is maintained across studies, few make any more definitive statements of how pachycetines may relate to other contemporary archaeocetes within this family, which is commonly found to be paraphyletic. In their 2013 paper, Gol'din and Zvonok recover Pachycetus (by them referred to as Basilotritus) as a comparably basal basilosaurid. In their study Basilosauridae, though broadly paraphyletic, still contained a monophyletic branch they referred to as "crown basilosaurids" containing taxa such as Dorudon and Basilosaurus itself. Within this grouping, the two species of Basilotritus they erected formed a clade of their own alongside specimen MUSM 1443, which was found to be more derived than Supayacetus yet more basal than Zygorhiza. A somewhat similar conclusion was reached by van Vliet in 2020 based in part on the well-developed innominate bone of P. wardii. However, no full phylogenetic analysis was performed in this study, nor was one conducted in the description of Antaecetus.

Following the establishment of Pachycetinae as a recognized clade, the group was recovered in a notably different position in Antar et al. 2023. Similar to Gol'din and Zvonok's prior work basilosaurids were recovered as a paraphyletic group leading up to Neoceti with many of the core basilosaurids forming their own monophyletic group within this grade. The key difference lies in the position of pachycetines relative to other basilosaurids. Unlike previous publications, Antar and colleagues recovered pachycetines as being more derived than other basilosaurids, being placed as the immediate sister group to Neoceti. A further difference to the prior studies is that Supayacetus was found to not merely be a basilosaurid more basal than pachycetines but to clade with them, possibly being the basalmost pachycetine. This study also suggests that Pachycetus itself may be paraphyletic, as the American Pachycetus wardii claded closer with Antaecetus than with the European Pachycetus paulsonii.

- Pelagiceti
  - Eocetus
  - - - - Chrysocetus
        - - Ocucajea
          - Tutcetus rayanensis
      - - Zygorhiza
        - - - Saghacetus
            - Ancalecetus
          - - Basilosaurus
            - - Dorudon
              - Pontogeneus peruvianus
    - - - Supayacetus
        - - Pachycetus paulsonii
          - - Pachycetus wardii
            - Antaecetus aithai
      - Neoceti

== Evolutionary history ==
Most pachycetines with well-dated fossil remains suggest that the family was most prominent during the Bartonian, however, some localities that have yielded pachycetines might extend their range. For instance, the fossils of Pachycetus wardii stem from formations that span the Lutetian-Bartonian boundary, whereas some Pachycetus paulsonii remains may be as young as the Priabonian. Regardless of the first confirmed appearance, it is likely that the origin of Pachycetinae is tied to the global warming that occurred during the Lutetian thermal maximum and the middle Eocene climatic optimum. The brief period of cooler temperatures between these may be another point of origin for pachycetines, as it was during this time that the sea levels began to rise, leading to the conditions seen during the Bartonian. This interpretation is supported by the divergence time calculated by Antar and colleagues, who suggest that pachycetines split from other archaeocetes some 43 to 42 million years ago.

== Paleobiology ==
=== Locomotion and lifestyle ===
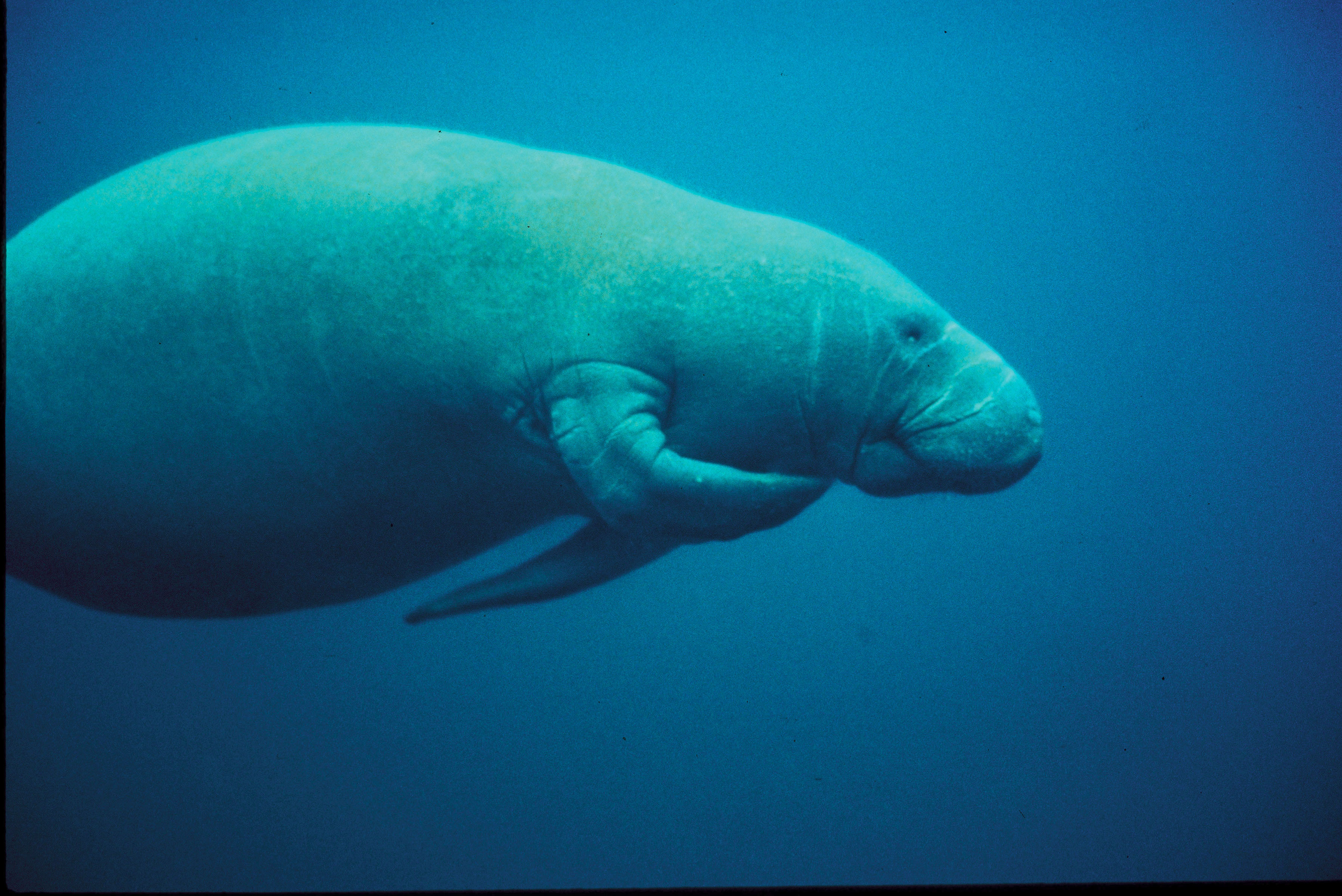
The skeletal structure of pachycetines is similar to what is seen in modern sirenians and interpreted as indicating slow movement.

The combination of a dense skeletal structure coupled with elongated vertebrae has been used to infer various aspects of the locomotion and lifestyle of pachycetines. For instance, the elongation of the lumbar vertebrae highly resembles what is seen in basilosaurines and suggests that these whales swam by undulating their entire bodies. However, since the transverse processes of pachycetines are nearly as elongated as the vertebral centra themselves, they would be a lot more limited in the movements they could perform. Specifically, the smaller space between the adjacent processes meant there was less space for muscles to contract, which effectively hindered the ability of pachycetines to move their bodies side to side. Because of this, the mobility of these whales would be much lower than that of other basilosaurids and likely restricted to undulating their spine dorsoventrally (up-and-down), leading to researchers comparing pachycetines to manatees. At the same time, research also suggests that pachycetines would have been powerful swimmers, despite their low mobility.

The pachyostosis, osteosclerosis and rib articulations also inform the lifestyle suggested for these animals. Gingerich and colleagues highlight how these traits may be advantageous for a multitude of purposes which may go hand in hand with each other. The increased density could serve as a form of ballast, which is commonly associated with a greater lung capacity, a hypothesis further supported by the rib articulation that would allow the animal to expand and collapse its ribcage, allowing for a greater intake of air at the surface and the option to expel air to reduce buoyancy after diving. In combination, these could indicate that pachycetines spent a lot of time feeding on the seafloor in relatively shallow water, that it was a slow swimmer and/or that it required large oxygen stores.

=== Diet ===
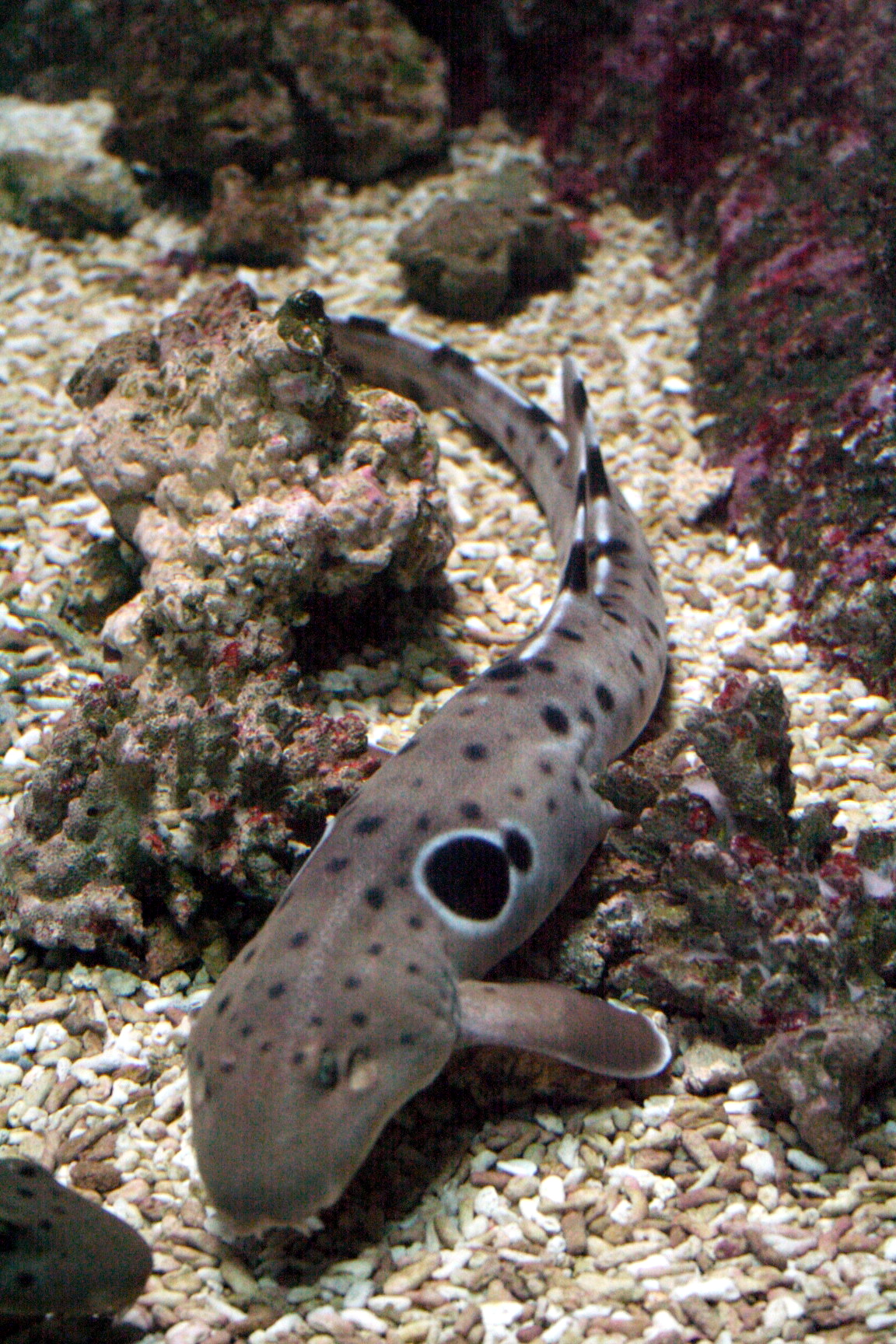
Sharks like those of the genus Hemiscyllium may have been a principal component of the diet of Pachycetus.

Owing to their dense skeleton and the inferred slow speed, it is thought that pachycetines were ambush predators rather than pursuit predators. However, the specific diet likely differed significantly between species. Antaecetus had much more gracile teeth that would have been more prone to abrasion and wear, which Gingerich and colleagues argue rules out the possibilities that it fed on hard-shelled molluscs or obtained food directly from the seafloor (as the ingested sand would contribute to tooth wear). Herbivory as displayed by sirenians is also ruled out. Instead, a more generalized diet of fish and marine invertebrates has been proposed for Antaecetus.

The diet of Pachycetus has been studied in greater detail. Several types of abrasion have been found on the teeth of Pachycetus, which were notably more robust than those of Antaecetus. These patterns of tooth wear have been compared to those seen in modern whales and seemingly indicate that Pachycetus at least occasionally fed on sharks and may have even been specialised in them. Following this hypothesis, the teeth were worn down by coming in contact with the placoid scales of sharks and other cartilaginous fish. This notion finds support in the diverse chondrichthyan fauna of the localities that yield Pachycetus fossils. Some Ukrainian localities for instance yield up to 35 species of shark including Scyliorhinus sp., Hemiscyllium bruxelliensis, Carcharias acutissimu and Clerolamna umovae. The American localities that were once home to Pachycetus wardii were similar, with the Piney Point Formation preserving 19 species of sharks and an additional 9 species of rays.

=== Paleoenvironment ===
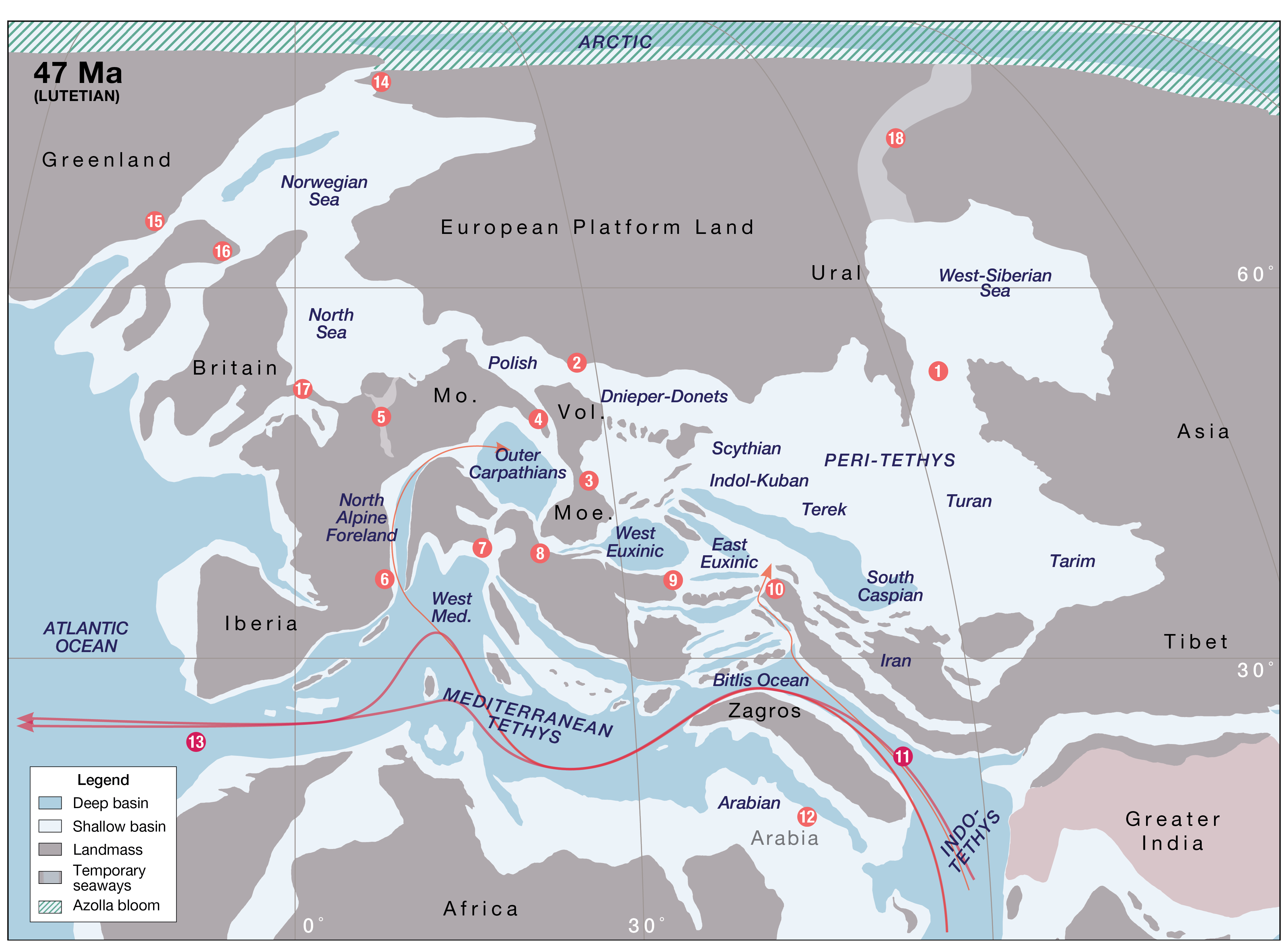
During the Lutetian much of Europe was covered by a shallow sea.

The idea that pachycetines were shallow-water animals that has been derived from the skeletal anatomy finds additional support in the types of environments that fossils of these animals were found in. For instance, the region around Helmstedt that has yielded much of the German remains once formed the southern edge of the Paleogene North Sea, with the environment featuring estuaries fed by the rivers that ran into the sea from the continent. The Annenberg Formation seems to suggest a depth of 150 m (490 ft), while the overlying Gehlberg Formation was deposited at a depth of only around 50–100 m (160–330 ft). The same applies to the Piney Point Formation of Virginia, which represents shallow marine sediments deposited at a depth of approximately 60–120 ft (18–37 m). Molluscs from this formation further suggest mild to warm water temperatures whereas the terrestrial climate is interpreted as having been tropical with dry winters. There may however be some evidence that pachycetines were not restricted to shallow waters at all times. Ukrainian remains have been recovered from sediments that contain glauconite, a mineral formed between depths of 50–500 m (160–1,640 ft) and most common between 200–300 m (660–980 ft). Gol'din and Zvonok have suggested that this could hint at potential migrating behavior, with the animals entering deeper waters while travelling. Such behaviour would profit from the increase in ballast and the powerful swimming musculature that is suggested by the anatomy of the vertebrae.

The Aridal Formation where Antaecetus has been discovered stands out primarily due to the large amount of cetaceans recovered from its sediments. In addition to Antaecetus, a minimum of five other species are known from there, together representing a broad range in size. The smallest forms are two protocetids and the basilosaurid Chrysocetus fouadassaii. The largest protocetid from the Aridal Formation is Pappocetus which is thought to be within the same size range as Antaecetus. The largest cetacean of the formation is Eocetus.
