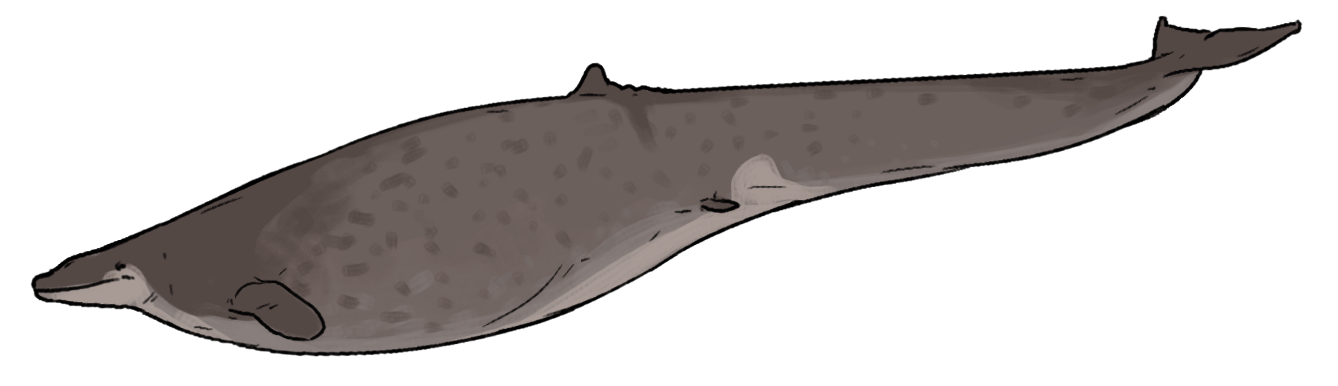
- Life restoration

Scientific classification
- Kingdom: Animalia
- Phylum: Chordata
- Class: Mammalia
- Infraclass: Placentalia
- Order: Artiodactyla
- Infraorder: Cetacea
- Family: †Basilosauridae
- Subfamily: †Pachycetinae
- Genus: †Pachycetus van Beneden, 1883

Species
- P. paulsoni (Brandt, 1873) (type); P. wardii (Uhen, 1999)

Synonyms
- Basilotritus Goldin and Zvonok 2013; Platyosphys Kellogg 1936

= Pachycetus =

Pachycetus Temporal range: Bartonian 41.2–37.8 Ma Though the best-dated remains are Bartonian in age, some could suggest its presence during the Lutetian and Priabonian.

Extinct genus of whales

Pachycetus (from Ancient Greek παχύς (pakhús), meaning "thick", and Latin cetus, meaning "whale") is an extinct genus of pachycetine basilosaurid from Middle Eocene of the eastern United States (North Carolina & Virginia) and Europe (chiefly Germany and Ukraine). The best known remains generally suggest that Pachycetus lived during the Bartonian, however, fossil finds have also been recovered from sediments of less certain age that could suggest that it may have also lived during the Late Lutetian and Early Priabonian. Pachycetus is primarily known from vertebrae and ribs and is characterized by its highly osteosclerotic and pachyostotic skeleton. This means the bones not only featured thickened rings of cortical bone surrounding the internal cancellous bone, but the cortical bone was furthermore much denser than in other basilosaurids. Two species of Pachycetus are recognized: Pachycetus paulsonii from Europe and Pachycetus wardii from the United States. A third species might be represented by "Zeuglodon" wanklyni.

Pachycetus has a long and complex history, with its earliest recorded remains having been found in what is now Ukraine in the late 19th century. The fossils were initially dubbed Zeuglodon rossicus, only to be immediately renamed to Zeuglodon paulsonii. Simultaneously, fossils from the north of Germany were described as Pachycetus, a name that would eventually fade into obscurity as time passed on. The Ukrainian material would eventually come to be named Platyosphys before being changed to Basilotritus, though the reasoning for the latter was regarded as unjustified and was not accepted in much of the subsequent literature. By the 2020s it was recognized that the German Pachycetus and the Ukrainian Platyosphys most likely represented a single taxon, which came to combine the generic name of the former and the species name of the latter. A species from the USA previously known as "Eocetus" wardii was also introduced to the genus and together with Antaecetus these animals would become the basis of the family Pachycetinae.

Given the limited material known of this genus, its biology is only poorly understood. The dense skeletal structure is commonly compared to that seen in modern-day sirenians (manatees and dugongs) and it has been suggested that it was a powerful if comparably inflexible swimmer that swam by moving its entire body up and down similar to Basilosaurus. It has further been suggested that Pachycetus preferred shallow waters and fed close to the seafloor, a suggestion largely congruent with the German and American sediments it has been recovered from. Some fossils from Ukraine do however suggest that Pachycetus at least occasionally entered deeper waters, which has been interpreted as potential evidence for migratory behavior. Tooth wear has been used as evidence for the fact that Pachycetus might have fed primarily on chondrichthyans like sharks and rays, arguing that the high levels of abbrasion seen on some of the teeth was caused by contact with their preys placoid scales. Some supporting evidence for this hypothesis may be found in the high number of sharks and rays found within the same sediments as Pachycetus.

== History and naming ==
=== Early discoveries, Pachycetus and Platyosphys ===
Pachycetus has a long and complex history, in part due to the often fragmentary and isolated nature of much of the material referred to this genus. The earliest recorded mention of material now assigned to Pachycetus dates back to 1871, when fossils of this whale where reported by botanist Afanasii Semenovich Rogovich at the Third Russian Congress of Naturalists in Kyiv. The material consisted of three complete and one partial vertebral centra, discovered near the Tiasmyn River south of Chyhyryn, Ukraine. These remains were eventually described by Otto Mikhaĭlovich Paulson at the behest of Johann Friedrich Brandt, who published the description in his 1873 monograph on European fossil whales. Paulson initially dubbed the material Zeuglodon rossicus, but Brandt changed the name to Zeuglodon paulsonii, reasoning that the name was better suited in case material outside of the then Russian Empire would be found. Paulson seemingly didn't object to the change, though later authors would occasionally refer to the taxon as Zeuglodon rossicum regardless.

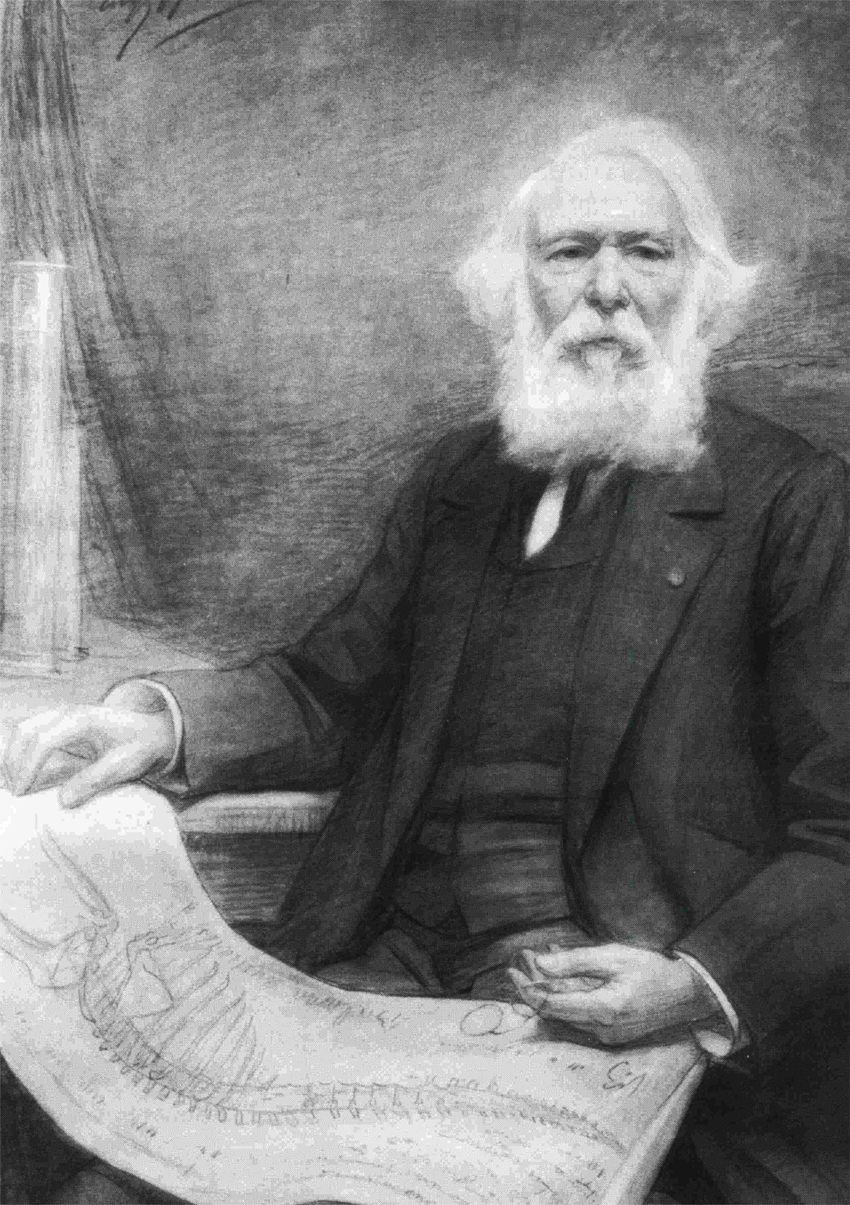
The name Pachycetus was coined by Pierre-Joseph van Beneden, though his work was largely overlooked in the following century.

Around the same time another archaeocete was discovered within the Barton Clay of the UK. The nearly complete skull discovered in 1872, which was damaged during collection, was described in 1876 by Harry Govier Seeley and named Zeuglodon wanklyni. Though the holotype has been lost since then, various other elements referred to Z. wanklyni have been described in subsequent years. In Germany meanwhile Hanns Bruno Geinitz published on a vertebral centrum recovered from the phosphate beds (likely the Gehlberg Formation) of Helmstedt, Lower Saxony, which represented the first example of a fossil whale being found within the country. Later publications also make mention of another centra and a rib, which alongside the first centrum and some other whales bones were sent to Pierre-Joseph Van Beneden in Leuven, Belgium. Taking note of the robust nature of the bones and their similarity to those of sirenians, Van Beneden described them as a new genus of what he thought to be a mysticete whale, which he named Pachycetus robustus. He furthermore described a second species, Pachycetus humilis based on some of the smaller fossils sent to him by Geinitz. Kuhn published a redescription of the two taxa in 1935, though he was less convinced of their distinctiveness. He rejected the name Pachycetus and instead suggested that the fossils may have been those of Zeuglodon isis (now Basilosaurus isis) and Zeuglodon osiris (now Saghacetus osiris). Kuhn furthermore described several additional fossils and correctly hypothesized that they were Eocene in age, while Van Beneden had assumed them to be Oligocene.

Additional archaeocete material from eastern Europe was described in 1894 by Leonid Ivanovich Lutugin, who discusses a vertebra found within the Donets River basin that he referred to the genus Zeuglodon, and even more complete material was discovered in 1909 near Koropove. In addition to the initial three vertebra discovered by Alexandre S. Fedorowskij, another seven vertebrae were recovered by farmworkers from the region. The ten vertebrae, regarded as lumbar, saccral and caudal vertebrae by Fedorowskij, were described in 1912 and assigned to the species Zeuglodon rossicus before being introduced into the collection of Kharkiv University, though their whereabouts following WW2 are not known and the remains are currently considered lost.

In his 1936 monograph on archaeocetes, Remington Kellogg recognized the distinct nature of the taxon and coined the new genus Platyosphys for Zeuglodon paulsonii, primarily basing his work on the material previously described by Fedorowskij. He furthermore referred Zeuglodon wanklyni to the genus Zygorhiza, but failed to mention the material from Germany. It is thought by van Vliet that this was likely due to the fact that Kuhn had only identified the Helmstedt material as archaeocetes a year earlier, with Kellogg simply having been unaware of this research. Things went quiet for the following 70 years until 2001, when Volodymyr P. Gritsenko described Platyosphys einori from material discovered in Pyrohiv south of Kyiv. Although Gritsenko took note of the advanced pachyostosis of the material, likening it to what is seen in modern sirenians, he failed to provide an adequate diagnosis for this new species. The validity of P. einori eventually came into question, with other authors highlighting that the material is very poorly preserved, casting doubt over the Gritsenko's claims of it being distinct, and overall not diagnostic enough to be referred to any species or genus.

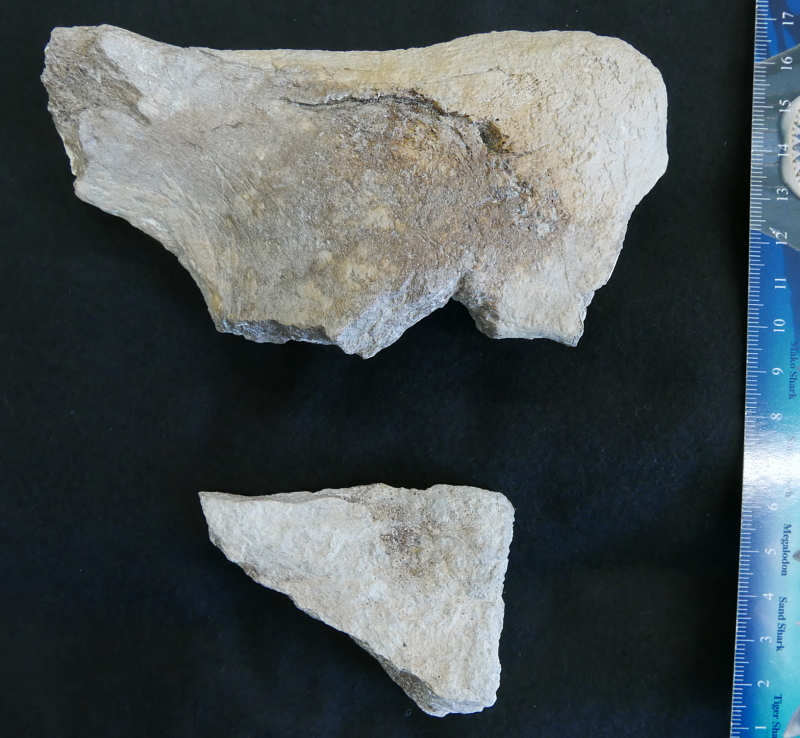
Pachycetus wardii was described based on assorted cranial and postcranial remains including parts of the innominate.

In 1999 Mark D. Uhen described Eocetus wardii based on material from the collection of the United States National Museum of Natural History, which had been discovered in 1977 in North Carolina. The type specimen of E. wardii consisted of a variety of bones including fragments of the skull, various vertebrae, ribs and parts of the innominate bone of the pelvic region. Additional specimens were referred to this species in 2001 by Uhen himself and in 2011 by Weems and colleagues, who expanded the range of E. wardii into Virginia. By that point however the assignment of the fossils to Eocetus had fallen out of favour, with Geisler, Sanders and Luo (2005) suggesting it be named "Eocetus" wardii until further study could determine its generic identification.

=== Basilotritus ===
The 2000s and 2010s saw an increase in newly described basilosaurid material from Ukraine that may or may not have come from Pachycetus, some of which were featured a map by Evgenij Zvonok that figured archaeocete localities across Ukraine and Russia. Material discovered include teeth and ribs from Nagornoye (initially referred to Basilosauridae indet.) and vertebrae from Kurenevka ("Eocetus" sp.). These new finds eventually lead to another attempt at clarifying the taxonomy of Platyosphys by Gol'din and Zvonok in 2013. In their work they name the new genus Basilotritus as a replacement for Platyosphys, reasoning that the loss of the Platyosphys paulsonii should constitute it being a nomen dubium. Basilotritus uheni was named on the basis of various postcranial fossils and a tympanic bulla while a variety of less complete remains were referred to Basilotritus sp.. The two also wrote on the assignment of "Eocetus" wardii, ultimately keeping the species but placing it in Basilotritus as well. However, as pointed out by Gingerich and Zouhri in 2015, the availability of the holotype is not a prerequisite for the continued validity of a taxon. Instead the descriptions provided by Brandt, Fedorowskij and Kellogg were deemed sufficient for Platyosphys paulsonii to remain valid while the status of Basilotritus uheni was questioned. The same publication went on to not only reaffirm the validity of Platyosphys, but also to name a new species: Platyosphys aithai based on fossil material collected from Morocco.

=== Revival of Pachycetus and recent studies ===
While this seemingly settled the matter of validity, the nomenclature was still subject to change. In a paper published in 2020, van Vliet noted that the vertebrae of Platyosphys and Basilotritus were identical to those from Germany originally described as Pachycetus. As Pachycetus was named in 1883, a whole 43 years before Platytholus, the rules of the ICZN dictated that Pachycetus had priority. Simultaneously, since the species P. paulsonii predates P. robustus, the former takes priority over the latter, which means that the type species would still Pachycetus paulsonii. Van Vliet recognizes that P. robustus could be a junior synonym of P. paulsonii, but refrains from committing to this given how fragmentary the Helmstedt material is. In light of this Platyosphys aithai, Basilotritus uheni and Basilotritus wardii were all carried over as distinct species of Pachycetus. Pachycetus humilis on the other hand, described by van Beneden in 1883, did not receive the same treatment. Instead it was speculated that it could represent a whale distinct from Pachycetus, a sentiment later echoed by Gingerich and colleagues.

Two years later Gingerich, Amane and Zhouri published another revision to Pachycetus, though one less drastic than the work of van Vliet. Following a summary of the genus' complex history, they conclude that Pachycetus aithai was sufficiently distinct to warrant its own genus, which they named Antaecetus, and furthermore commit to lumping P. robustus into P. paulsonii. The team also agrees with van Vielt in sinking Basilotritus into Pachycetus, with B. uheni now deemed a synonym of Pachycetus paulsonii.

=== Etymology ===
The name Pachycetus was chosen by van Beneden as a clear allusion to the thickened nature of the bones of the genus, with the name directly translating to "thick whale". Several other names have been proposed in the past, including Basilotritus ("third king" in allusion to Basilosaurus and Basiloterus) and Platyosphys ("broad loin" in reference to the wide transverse processes of the lumbar vertebrae).

== Species ==
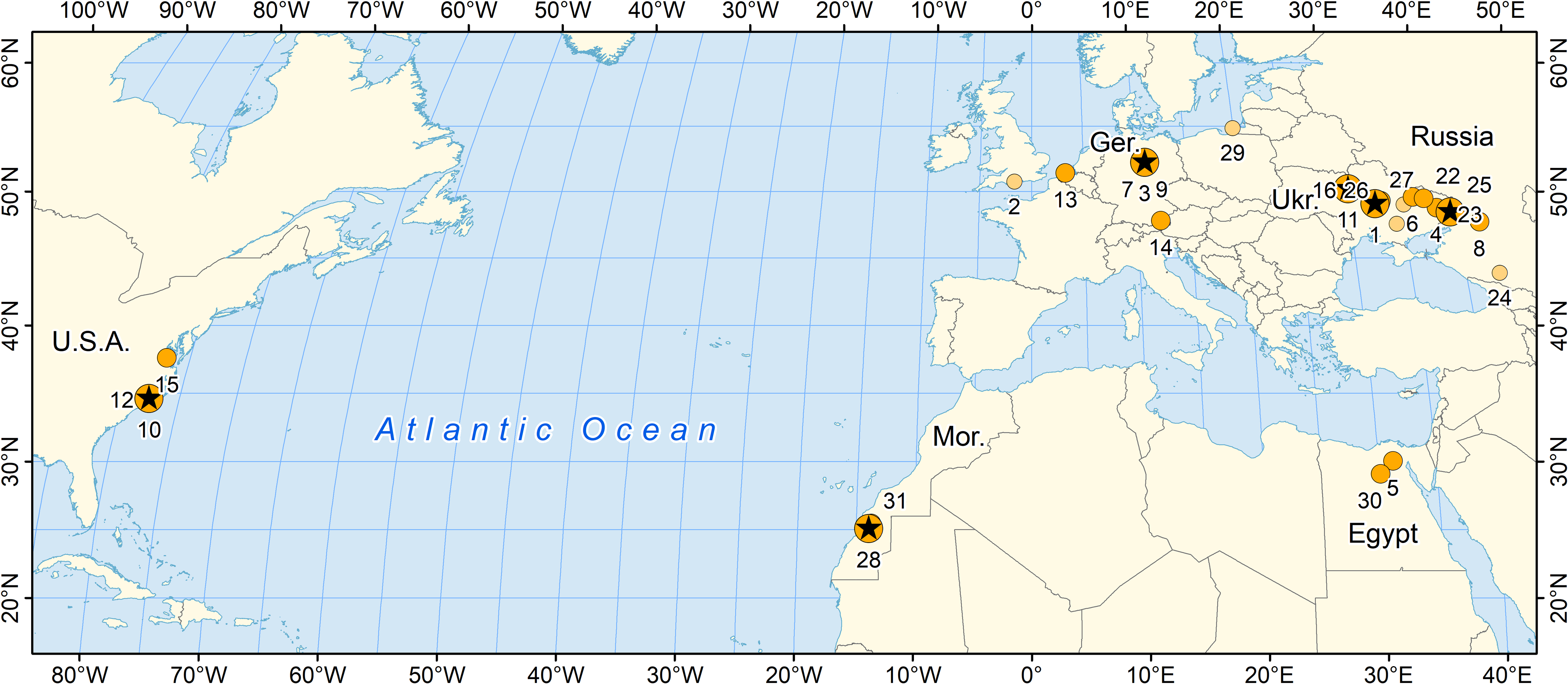
Remains of Pachycetus are known from across Europe and the eastern United States, while the related Antaecetus inhabited North Africa.

- Pachycetus paulsonii

The type species of Pachycetus is currently only known from European deposits, with fossils having been found in Ukraine, Russia and Germany. Van Vliet and colleagues assign the German remains to the Bartonian to Priabonian stages of the Eocene, while Gingerich later stated that all well-dated material stems from the Bartonian. The possibility that some fossils were reworked into younger strata is mentioned by van Vliet, but deemed unlikely. Pachycetus paulsonii is noted for having been larger than the American species, although Gingerich and colleagues do not list any other diagnostic features to separate the two species. The species was named after Otto Mikhaĭlovich Paulson.

- Pachycetus wardii

Originally named as a species of Eocetus and later transferred to the genus Basilotritus, P. wardii is exclusively known from North America, specifically North Carolina and Virginia. The Castle Hayne Formation, where the holotype of P. wardii was found, has been suggested to be either late Lutetian or early Bartonian in age and a similar age has been assumed for the Piney Point Formation. It was smaller than Pachycetus paulsonii and is known from fewer remains, though said remains are more complete than any of the European finds. It was named in honour of Lauck "Buck" Ward who discovered the holotype.

A potential third species might be represented by "Zeuglodon" wanklyni, which is currently only known from the UK. However this species is only known from very fragmentary remains, making it unclear if it represents a distinct species or if it simply represents one of the other two species having lived in Britain. Fossils of a small species with less compact vertebrae have been recovered from the Lutetian to Bartonian of Spain (Folgarolas Formation) and the North Sea off the Dutch-Belgian coast (Maldegem Formation).

== Description ==
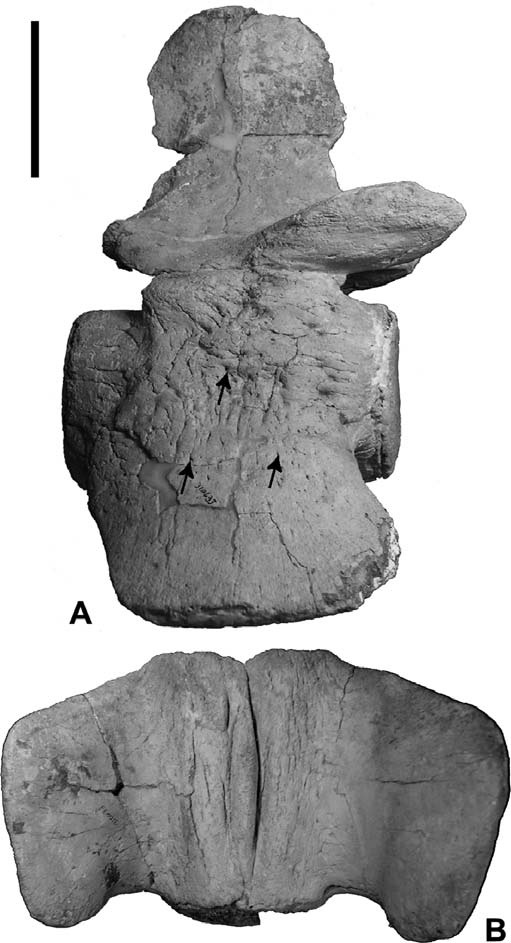
A lumbar vertebrae of Eocetus wardii with the "pockmarks" highlighted by arrows.

The teeth of Pachycetus are more robust than those of Antaecetus and possessing crenulated tooth enamel. The first premolar of the upper jaw is either double-rooted or had two fused roots. The premolars further back display four accessory cusps (sometimes also referred to as denticles) preceding and following the apex of tooth, whereas Antaecetus only has three. The two also differ in that Pachycetus lacks a swelling on the molars which is seen in Antaecetus. The molar, unlike the premolar, only has three accessory cusps. Overall the teeth of Pachycetus resemble those of other basilosaurids. Incisors and canine teeth that could have belonged to Pachycetus and were referred to Basilotritus have been described by Gol'din and colleagues.

Gingerich and colleagues argue that Pachycetus had a proportionally larger head than Antaecetus, although little of the cranium is known, with the most substantial material being that of Pachycetus wardii. Gol'din and Zvonok describe the tympanic bulla, an element created by the fusion of the ear bones, in their diagnosis for Basilotritus, stating that the sigmoid process of this bone was broad and plate-like with a transverse rim that was not well developed. A prominent keel emerges from the medial margin of the bulla and the involucrum is much steeper towards the front, both features setting the taxon aparat from most other basilosaurids. Gol'din and Zvonok further note that both the anterior process and the posterior (back) end of the bulla are rounded and blunt. Overall its size and shape resemble the ear bones of Zygorhiza and Gol'din and Zvonok describe it as displaying a mix of features seen in basilosaurids and protocetids.

The thoratic vertebrae of Pachycetus show a rapid increase in size as one follows the vertebral column, a size increase so extreme that even individual vertebrae already appear trapezoid in shape with a much larger posterior end. According to van Vliet the vertebrae are wider than they are tall, separating them from those of Basilosaurus and Eocetus. The lumbar vertebrae meanwhile are elongated in a fashion similar to those of basilosaurines, though not quite as extreme in their proportions. A major difference in the lumbar vertebrae of Pachycetus versus those of basilosaurines lies in the transverse processes. In Pachycetus these processes are almost as long as the centra of the corresponding vertebrae, which is not the case in basilosaurines. Both the pedicles (surrounding the neural canal) and the neural arch are also elongated. The elongation of the vertebrae is accompanied by a notable reduction in their number, with Pachycetus wardii preserving 12 thoratic vertebrae (though this could also be the ancestral condition) and six lumbars. The presence of a smaller number of longer vertebrae is similar to what is observed in modern whales and highlighted by Gol'din and Zvonok as differing greatly from Basilosaurus, which despite its elongated centra still retained a high vertebrae count. The surface of each vertebra is covered in small vascular openings, resulting in the bones having a pockmarked texture.

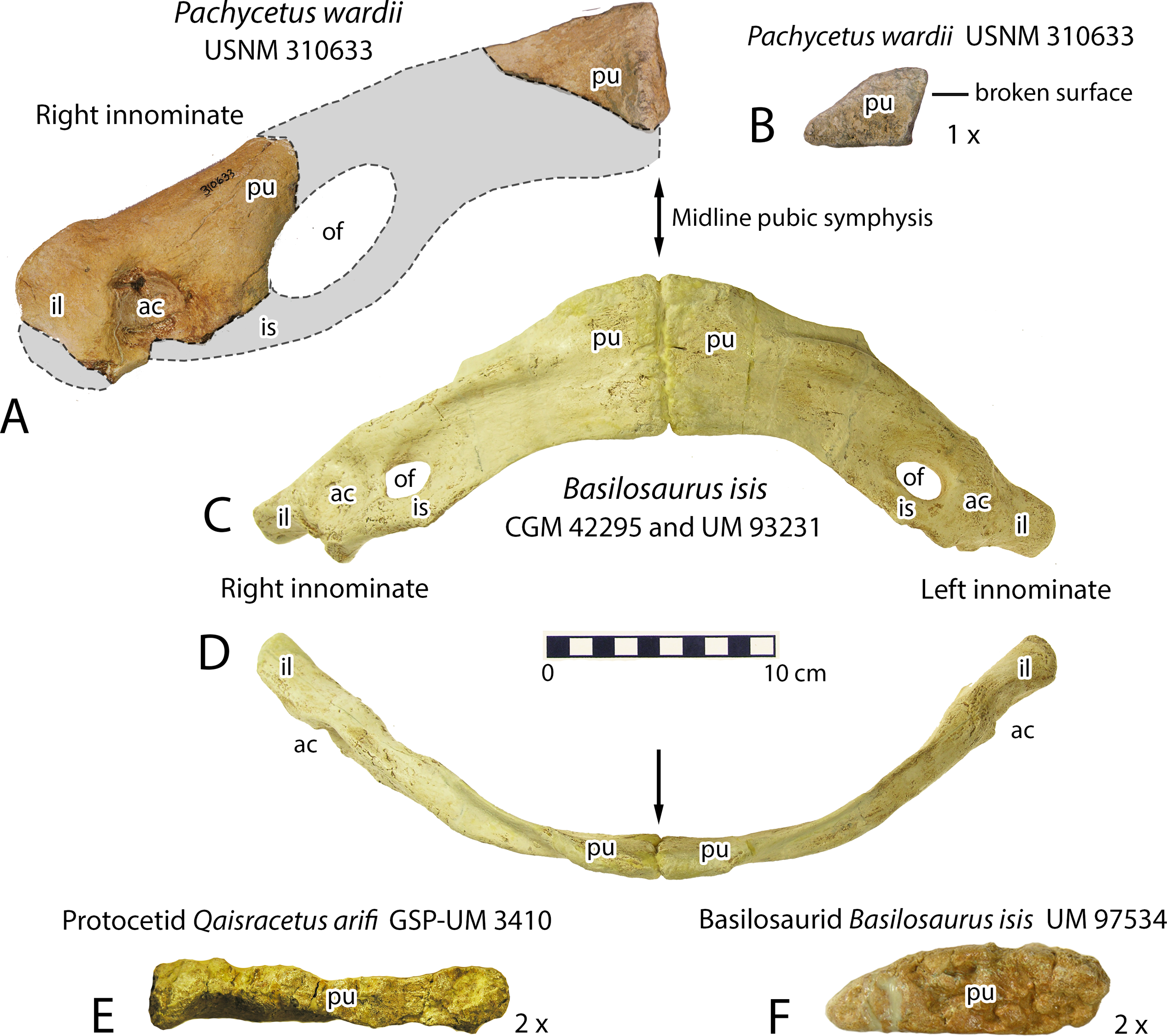
Innominate bones of Pachycetus, Basilosaurus and Qaisracetus

Though the individual vertebrae are elongated in a similar manner to those of basilosaurines, they differ in how much denser they are, which is achieved through the internal architecture of the bone. In basilosaurines, the vertebrae have been described as containing cylinders of cancellous bone that fill up the anterior and posterior of each vertebra. In Pachycetus and other pachycetines meanwhile the cancellous bone is present in the form of two cones with their tips facing each other, meaning the central section of the vertebrae is surrounded by a much thicker and denser ring of cortical bone. This condition of having a thickened layer of lamellar cortical bone is what is known as pachyostosis and gives Pachycetus its name. However, Van Vliet and colleagues argue that the presence of cones is more widespread than presumed by Gingerich and Zouhri and in fact common across basilosaurids. Regardless, the cortical bone within the vertebrae is osteosclerotic, meaning it is even denser than is typical for whales, with much fewer porosities. Like the centra, the pedicles of the vertebrae, which flank the neural canal, are pachyostotic as well. The ribs also contribute to the increased density of the skeleton, being pachyostotic themselves and having replaced the synovial articulation between ribs and vertebrae with ligaments and cartilage. Though the articulation is best described in Antaecetus, the rough surface seen in Pachycetus indicate that they were similar. The densest ribs are the late vertebrosternal ribs and the early vertebrochondral ribs. One feature highlighted for the ribs of Pachycetus is how the core of cancellous bone is situated in the middle of the ribs, while in other basilosaurids the core is slightly off-center.

Pachycetus is among the basilosaurids with known innominate bones, the element formed by the fusion of the hip bones, with the best material of this bone being preserved for Pachycetus wardii. Like in other members of its family and derived ceteaceans, the innominate bones of Pachycetus did not articulate at the sacrum, clearly setting it apart from the more basal protocetids. Furthermore, again like with other basilosaurids, the innominates retain features like the acetabular fossa and the obturator foramen which have been lost by today's whales. There are however notable differences between Pachycetus and other basilosaurids as well. For instance, the obturator foramen, an opening in the innominate, is much larger in Pachycetus. Additional material has been described for the European species and Gol'din and Zvonok include in their diagnosis for Basilotritus uheni that the section formed by the ilium extends forward whereas the ischiac part is highly reduced.

Pachycetus is described as having been larger than the related Antaecetus, with Pachycetus paulsonii being noticeably larger than Pachycetus wardii. In the former the lumbar vertebrae, including the epiphysis, measure up to 266 mm (10.5 in) compared to only 171 mm (6.7 in) in P. wardii, width some individual vertebrae reaching a length of over 280 mm (11 in).

== Phylogeny ==
While Pachycetus has a long history of research, its precise relationship with other basilosaurids has long remained unknown. In 2013 Gol'din and Zvonok found basilosaurids to be a paraphyletic clade giving rise to both the derived Neoceti (which includes today's whales) and what they refer to as "crown basilosaurids". Pachycetus, at the time called Basilotritus, was recovered as a basal off-shoot of the latter alongside MUSM 1443 from Peru. Their follow-up publication describing Basilotritus remains from Nagornoye recovered results much the same.

- - Pakicetus
  - - Maiacetus
    - Rodhocetus
    - - Artiocetus
      - - Qaisracetus
        - - Aegyptocetus
          - Protocetus
          - Carolinacetus
          - Gaviacetus
          - - Eocetus
            - Georgiacetus
            - - Babiacetus
              - - - Supayacetus
                  - - - MUSM 1443
                      - Basilotritus uheni
                      - Basilotritus wardii
                    - - Zygorhiza
                      - - Chrysocetus
                        - - - Saghacetus
                            - Ancalecetus
                          - - Cynthiacetus
                            - - Basilosaurus
                              - Dorudon
                - - Ocucajea
                  - - Kekenodontidae
                    - Neoceti

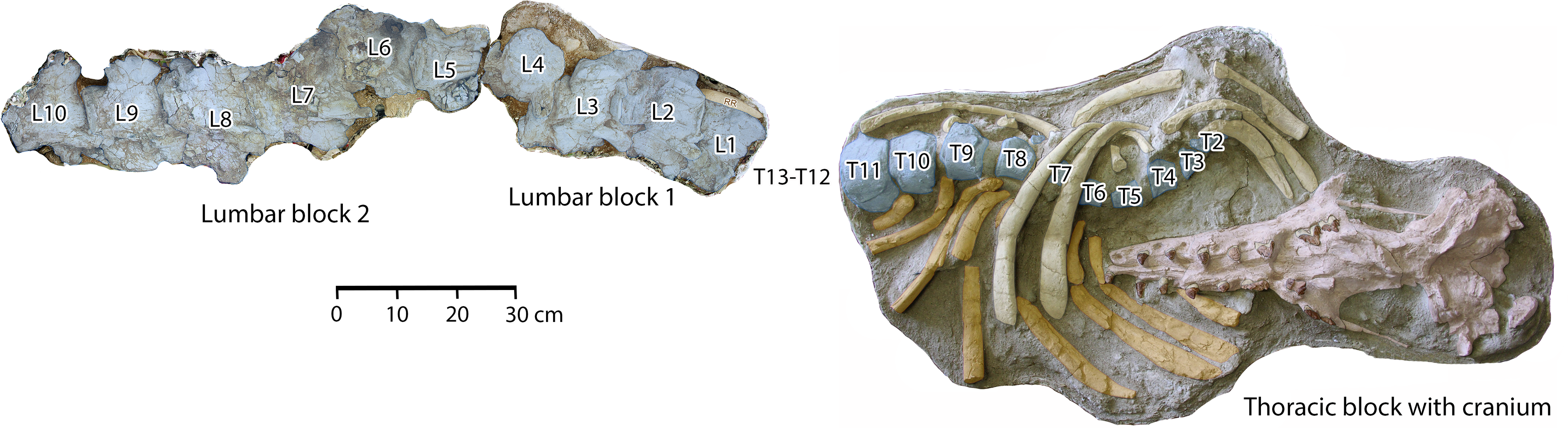
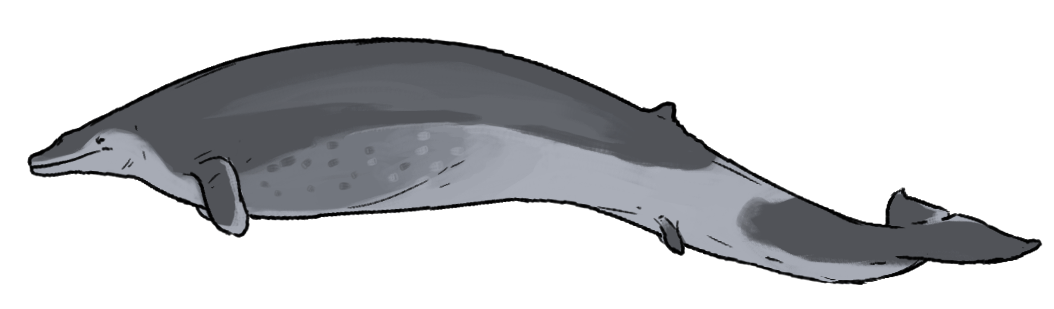
The closest relative of Pachycetus was Antaecetus, with which it forms the subfamily Pachycetinae. Top shows the holotype specimen of Antaecetus, bottom a live reconstruction.

Although no full analysis was performed, Van Vliet hypothesized that Pachycetus may have been a basal member of basilosauridae owning in part to its well developed innominate bones, which somewhat mirrors the position the taxon occupied in the work of Gol'din and Zvonok. This interpretation however is contrasted by a phylogenetic analysis published alongside the description of Tutcetus. While this study also supported a paraphyletic Basilosauridae, pachycetines in this study appeared to be more derived rather than basal, appearing as a sister group to Neoceti with all other basilosaurids having split off before the appearance of this clade. Within the family Pachycetus was found to be paraphyletic, with Pachycetus paulsonii and Pachycetus wardii being successively diverging taxa leading up to Antaecetus. Supayacetus from the Bartonian of South America was also recovered as a relative of Pachycetus and the basalmost member of this clade.

- Pelagiceti
  - Eocetus
  - - - - Chrysocetus
        - - Ocucajea
          - Tutcetus rayanensis
      - - Zygorhiza
        - - - Saghacetus
            - Ancalecetus
          - - Basilosaurus
            - - Dorudon
              - Pontogeneus peruvianus
    - - - Supayacetus
        - - Pachycetus paulsonii
          - - Pachycetus wardii
            - Antaecetus aithai
      - Neoceti

== Paleobiology ==
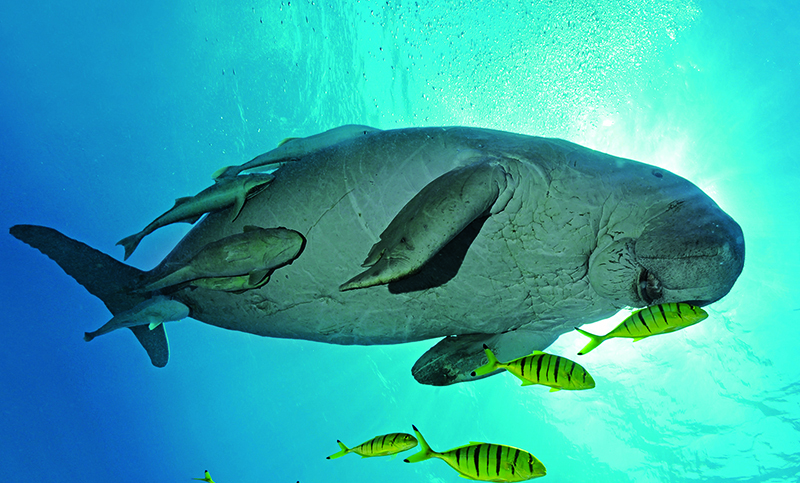
Due to its dense skeleton Pachycetus is at times compared to modern sirenians like the dugong.

=== Locomotion and lifestyle ===
One of the most notable traits of Pachycetus and pachycetines in general is the great increase in bone density achieved via pachyostosis and osteosclerosis. This would have greatly increased the animal's weight and served as ballast. This however came at the cost of making the animal much slower to accelerate and less maneuverable while swimming. The animal's maneuverability was also negatively affected by the anatomy of the transverse processes of the vertebrae. Since the transverse processes were much more elongated than those of Basilosaurus, there is less space between each process and those preceding and following it. This in turn means less space for muscle contraction, which leads to a decrease in lateral flexibility. While Pachycetus would still share a swimming style broadly similar to that of Basilosaurus, undulating the entire body to move, it was much more restricted in its movement. Gingerich and colleagues argue that Pachycetus would have had to rely on dorsoventral undulation, meaning it was limited to moving its body up and down. This limited mobility, combined with the overall increase in density, is at times compared to modern sirenians.

While acceleration and mobility were limited, there may have also been a variety of advantages in the denser bones, especially if coupled with an increase in lung volume. Slow swimmers, animals requiring large oxygen stores and shallow water inhabitants feeding close to the ocean floor are all listed as profiting from such anatomy, with Gingerich and colleagues interpreting pachycetines as slow inhabitants of the neritic zone. Gol'din and Zvonok come to a similar conclusion while further highlighting how the large vertebral processes would indicate that Pachycetus, though slow-moving, was a powerful swimmer regardless. Given that these adaptations are poorly suited for pursuing prey items, it has been hypothesized that pachycetines were ambush-hunter.

=== Diet ===
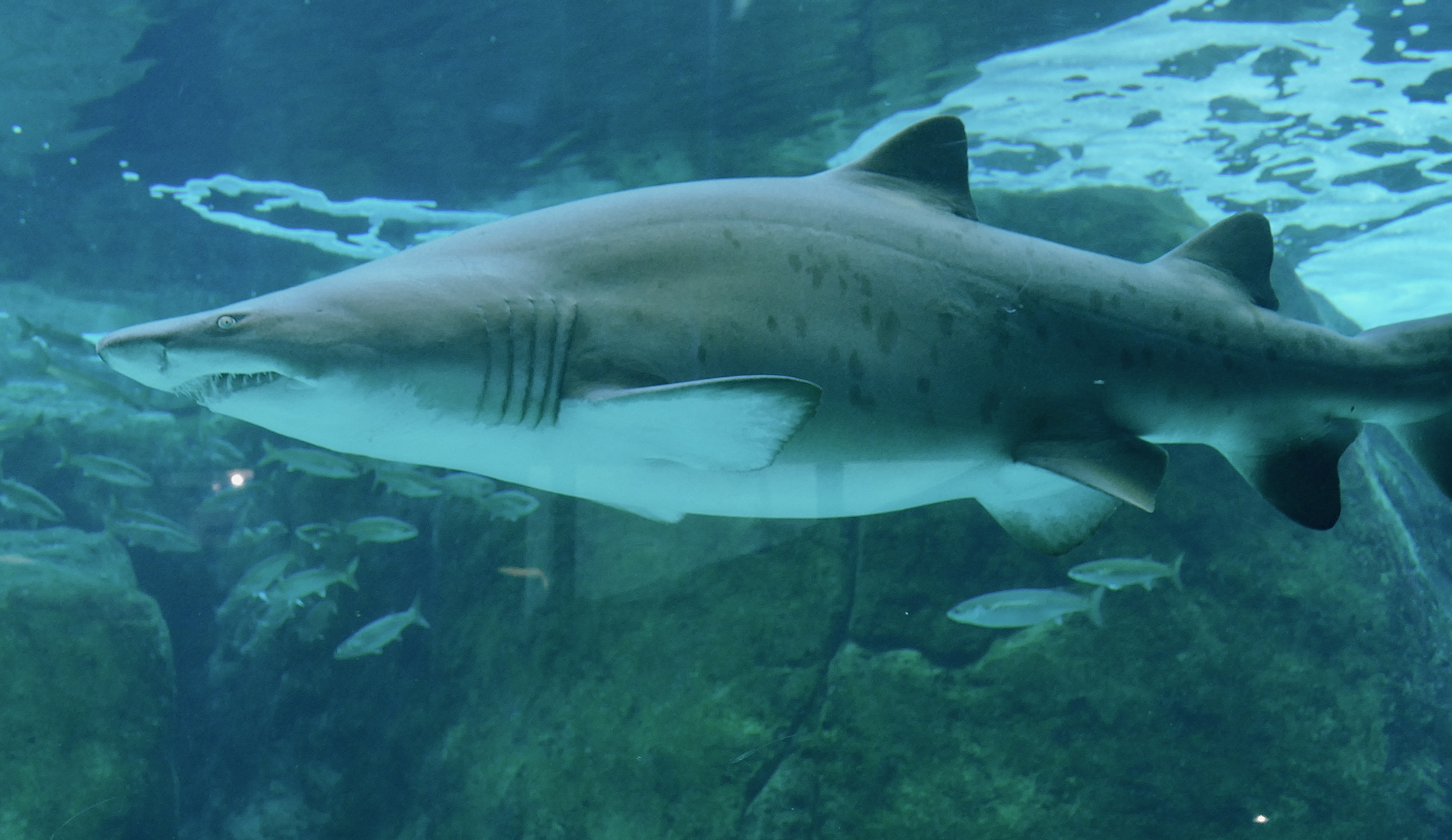
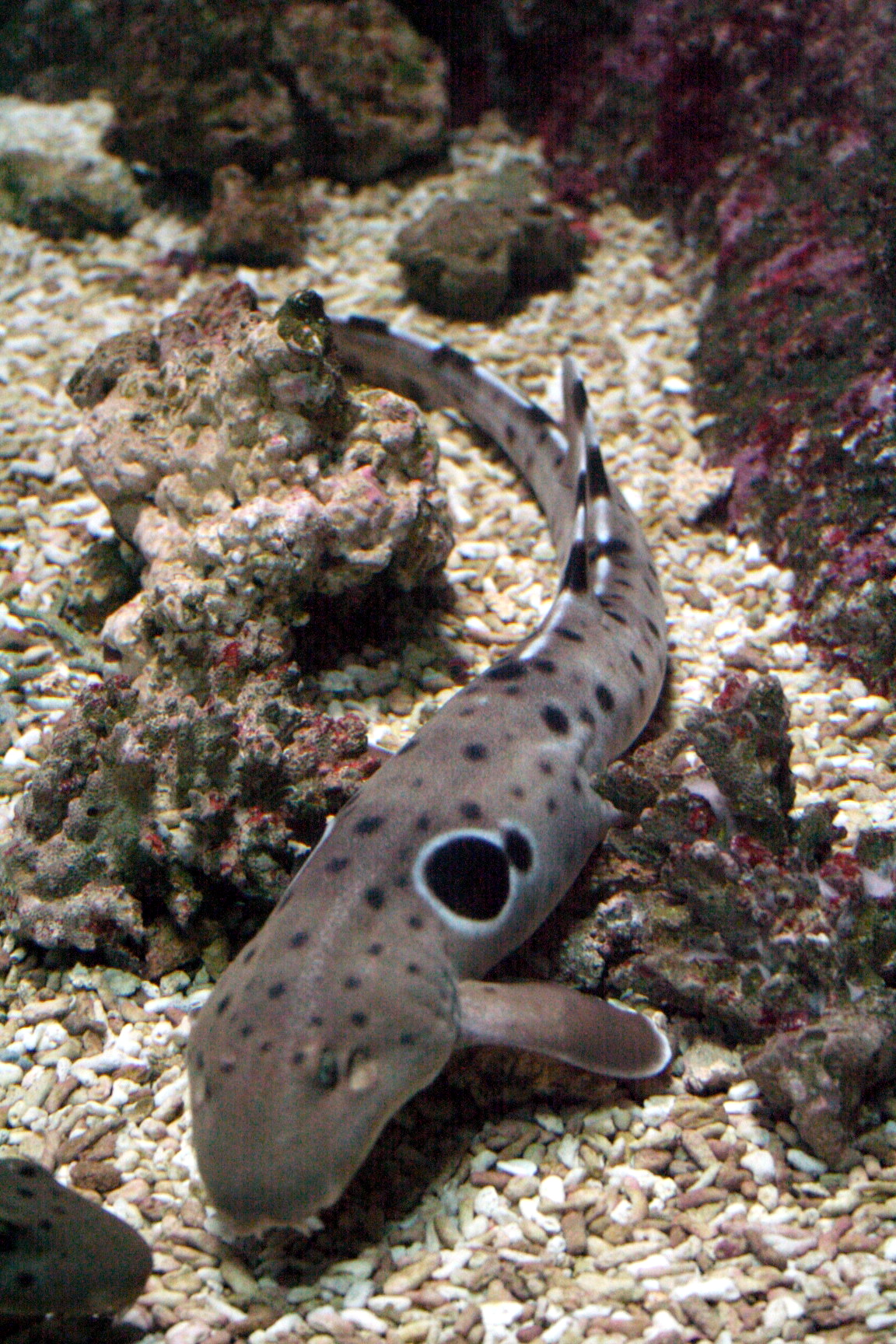
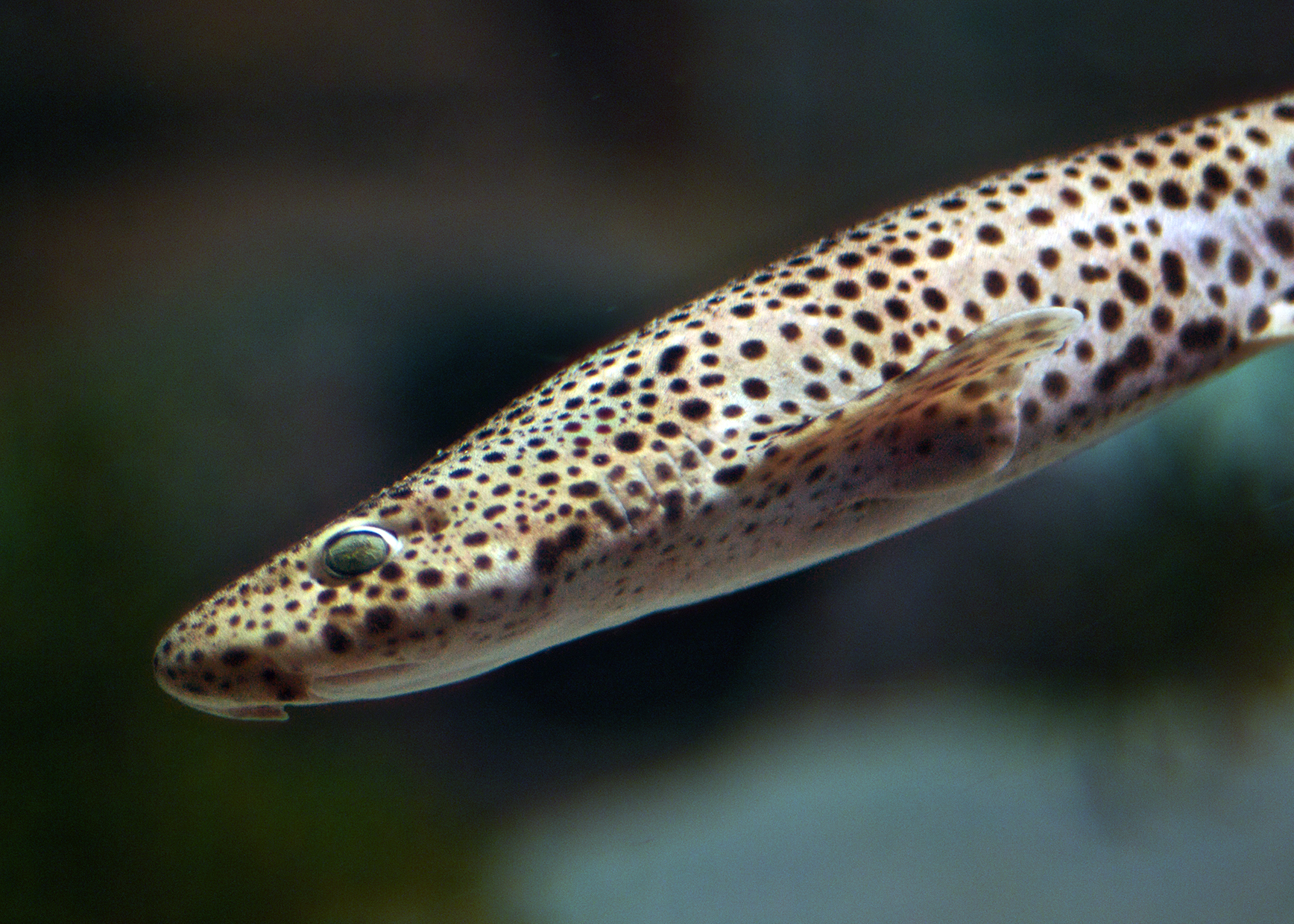
The diet of Pachycetus may have included sharks like the sand tiger shark (top), epaulette sharks (bottom left) and catsharks (bottom right).

Some inferences have been made on the diet of Pachycetus based on the patterns of tooth wear. Teeth from Ukraine show a mixed pattern of latitudinal and cross-oriented scratches as well as deeper gouges that cover the surface of the teeth. Prior studies have linked coarse patterns like gouges to a carnivorous diet like in Basilosaurus and orcas while the scratches mirror those seen in modern piscivorous toothed whales. Gol'din and colleagues especially highlight the strongly abraded tips of the teeth of the Nagornoye teeth they assigned to Basilotritus. This abrasion is seen across all types of teeth, but is least pronounced on the canines. The wear is described as uniform, leaving smooth margins and occurring perpendicular to the long axis of the tooth. In orcas, similar rapid abrasion is associated with the animals preying on sharks, causing the teeth to be worn down by their placoid scales. It is noted by the team that the same sediments yielding these teeth also preserve 35 species of sharks including Scyliorhinus sp., Hemiscyllium bruxelliensis, Carcharias acutissimu and Clerolamna umovae. A similarly diverse chondrichthyian fauna was present in the Americas, with the Piney Point Formation yielding the remains of 19 shark species and 9 species or rays. They therefore hypothesize that the animal was specialised in feeding on sharks.

=== Paleoenvironment ===
Helmstedt, where much of the German material of Pachycetus originated, was once located at the southern edge of the Paleogene North Sea where rivers from the continent filled an estuary. During the Paleogene the ocean retreated and expanded repeatedly, creating a mix of terrestrial and marine conditions. Multiple geological formations within the region around Helmstedt trace their origins to this period, including the Lutetian to Bartonian Annenberg Formation and the Bartonian to Priabonian Gehlberg Formation that is most likely to have yielded the bones of Pachycetus. During the time periods these formations were formed the sea was rather shallow, reaching a depth of only around 150 m (490 ft) at the time the Anneberg Formation was deposited and a depth between 50–100 m (160–330 ft) during the deposition of the Gehlberg Formation. Pachycetus would have shared this environment with a second, much smaller basilosaurid originally named Pachycetus humilis, though it is now believed to have been a dorudontine.

Similar to the German remains, the American fossils of Pachycetus wardii are also known from shallow marine sediments. The Piney Point Formation represents a shallow marine shelf that was deposited at a depth of around 60–120 ft (18–37 m). Molluscs from this formation suggest mild to warm temperatures and the terrestrial flora supported members of Fagaceae, Juglandaceae, ferns, tupelos and palms, which indicate that the climate was tropical with dry winters.

Ukrainian material is known from sediments containing glauconite, formed at depths between 50–500 m (160–1,640 ft) and most common between 200–300 m (660–980 ft), which has been interpreted to mean that Pachycetus at least occasionally left the shallows to venture into the open ocean. One hypothesis suggests that Pachycetus may have entered deeper waters while migrating, which would have been made possible by their powerful swimming musculature and its good ballast.
