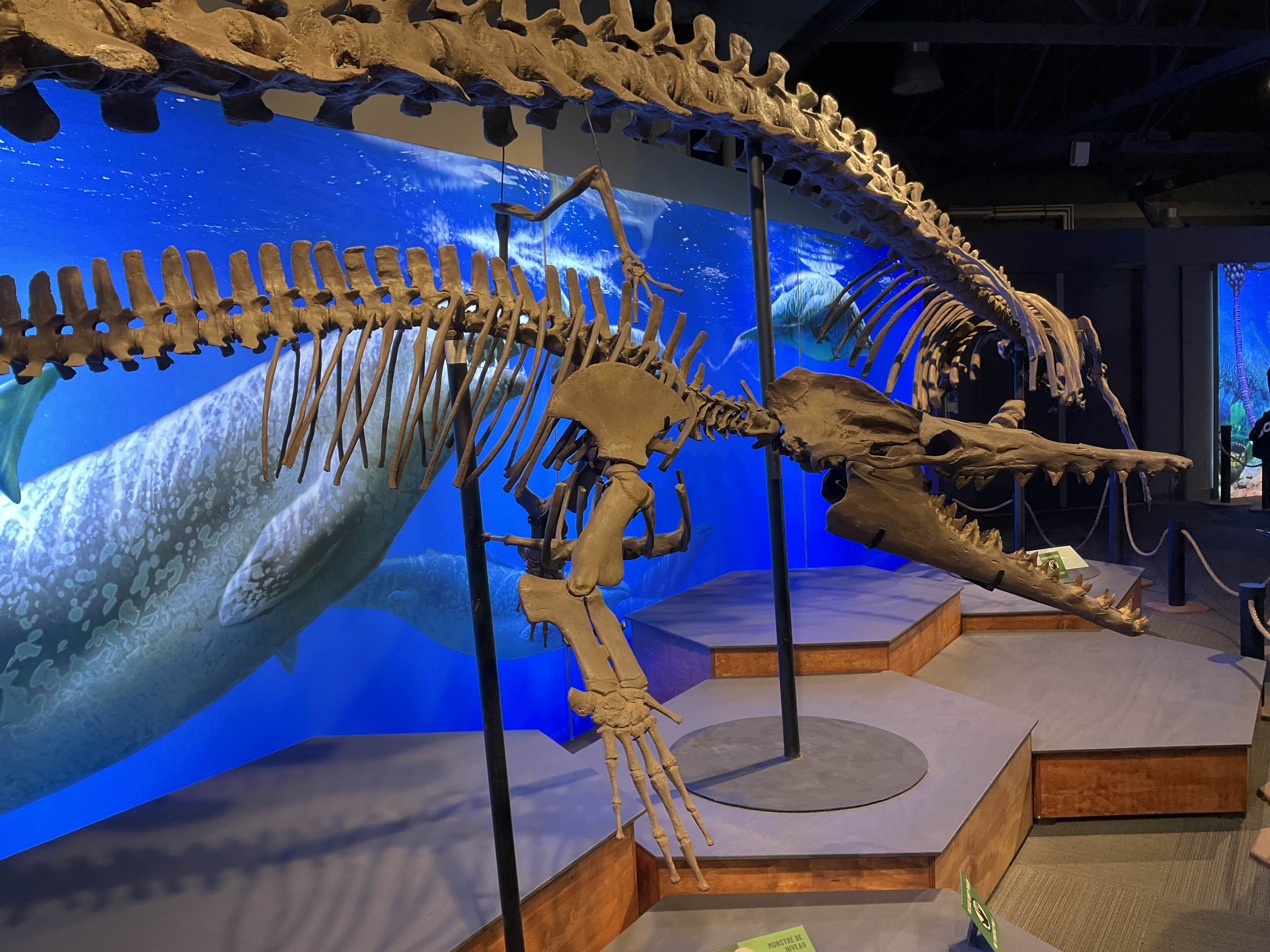
- A skeleton reconstruction of Chrysocetus fouadassii

Scientific classification
- Kingdom: Animalia
- Phylum: Chordata
- Class: Mammalia
- Order: Artiodactyla
- Infraorder: Cetacea
- Family: †Basilosauridae
- Subfamily: †Dorudontinae
- Genus: †Chrysocetus; Uhen & Ginerich, 2001

Species
- Chrysocetus fouadassii Gingerich and Zouhri, 2015; Chrysocetus healyorum Uhen and Gingerich, 2001 (type)

= Chrysocetus =

Chrysocetus Temporal range: Late Eocene Bartonian–Priabonian

Extinct basilosaurid early whale

Chrysocetus is a genus of extinct archaeocete ceteceans belonging to the Basilosauridae that is known from the Late Eocene of the eastern United States and western Africa. Across its range two species are known, the American Chrysocetus healyorum and the African Chrysocetus fouadassii, named in 2001 and 2015 respectively. Chrysocetus was a comparably small basilosaurid, larger than Saghacetus and Tutcetus but smaller than most other members of this group. In addition to being noted for its well-preserved hip bones, Chrysocetus is unique amongst basilosaurids for possibly having only had a single set of teeth. Though the fusion of the skeleton indicate that the holotype was a juvenile or subadult, the teeth represent the adult condition, having led to the hypothesis that unlike other basilosaurids and like modern whales, Chrysocetus did not replace its teeth but rather kept a single set throughout its life.

== History and naming ==
The type species, Chrysocetus healyorum, is based on a single subadult specimen from the late middle or early late Eocene of Orangeburg County, South Carolina. Initially, Uhen and Gingerich list the Cross Formation as being the source of the type material, tho later studies regard this horizone as a member of the Tupelo Bay Formation. The holotype, SCSM 87.195, consists of a partial skull with lower jaws, ten teeth, and the hyoid apparatus; 21 vertebrae, some ribs and a sternum; a partial left forelimb; and partial innominates. This species was discovered by Craig and Alice Healy, for which the type species was named, and scientifically described in 2001 by Mark D. Uhen and Phillip D. Gingerich. In their study, the two paleontologists took particular note of the innominate bones, as Chrysocetus was the first dorudontine with preserved pelvic material though its phylogenetic position remains variable across studies.

A second species, Chrysocetus fouadassii, was described from Bartonian-age Aridal Formation in the Western Sahara in 2015 alongside the pachycetine Antaecetus aithai (then a species of Platyosphys). C. fouadassii is known from fragmentary material of four individuals, namely a partial mandible, various isolated teeth and some postcranial elements. Though fragmentary and in some regards similar to the type species, a new species was erected in light of some proportional differences primarily concerning the neck vertebrae and limb bones.

According to Uhen and Gingerich, the name Chrysocetus is derived from the Greek words "chrysous", 'golden' and "ketos", 'whale'. The name was chosen in reference to the colouration of the holotype fossils, which are described as "rich gold".

== Species ==
- Chrysocetus healyorum

The type species of Chrysocetus was named in 2001 based on fossil remains from the Late Bartonian to Early Priabonian Tupelo Bay Formation, located in South Carolina. It was named for its discoverers, Craig and Alice Healy.

- Chrysocetus fouadassii

Named in 2015, C. fouadassii is exclusively known from the Bartonian Gueran locality of the Aridal Formation in Western Sahara. It chiefly differs from the type species through having longer neck vertebrae and limb bones. The species name honors the collector M'Barek Fouadassi, who led a paleontological expedition to the region in 2014.

== Description ==
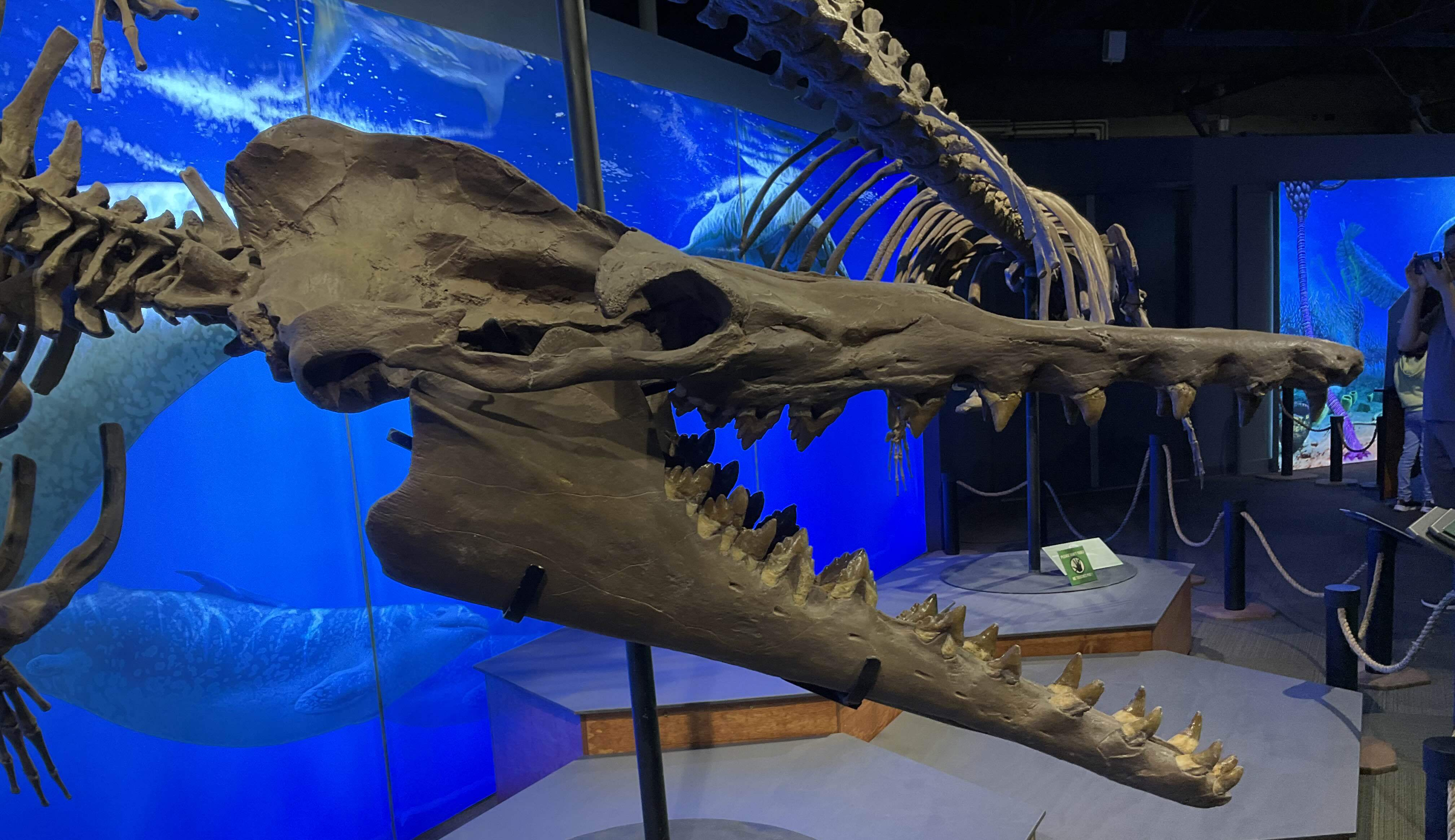
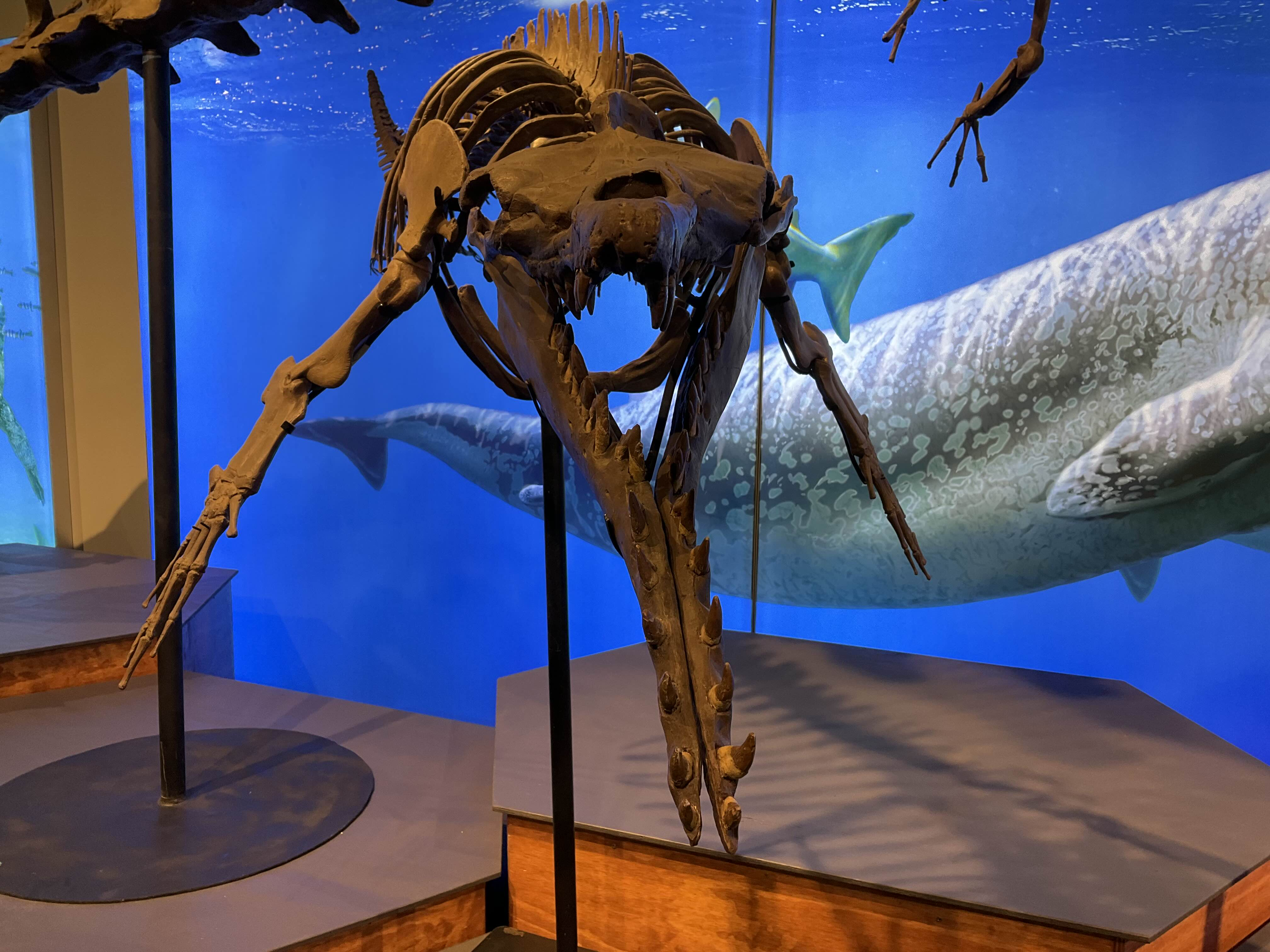
Side and front view of a cast of Chrysocetus fouadassii.

=== Skull ===
The skull of Chrysocetus is only poorly known, with much of it damaged or lost during excavation. What remains are parts of the occipital, temporal and frontal regions of the skull, parts of the premaxillae, a squamosal and lacrimal bone as well as a single tympanic bulla (the fused inner ear bones). The preserved elements of the premaxillae represent the very tip of the snout and contain the first three incisors. These bones show that Chrysocetus clearly had a tapering snout with a rounded tip. The alveoli (toothsockets) are separated by evenly spaced diastemas, which bear the marks left by the teeth of the mandible when the jaws were closed. Since the two individual premaxillae appear to have been unfused, they may have been separated by a grove or gap, something that was also the case for other basilosaurids.

The frontal bones are only fused towards the front of the skull but become unfused further towards the back where they connect to the parietal bones. The frontoparietal suture is curved, with the frontals projecting back into the parietals along the midline of the skull. Like the frontals, the parietals are only partially fused to each other, with the suture open towards the frontals and closed towards the back where they connect with the supraoccipital bone along an open suture. No interparietal bone is known from Chrysocetus and the sagittal crest is described as somewhat convex. The supraoccipital is not especially elevated above the parietal and a low boss projects back near its dorsal surface.

The lacrimal was found in isolation and was therefore likely unfused. Three grooves are present on the outer surface of the lacrimal, leading to the edge of the eyesocket. The jugal is missing both ends, but about halfway down its length the sides become noticeably flattened while the element expands in its height, thinning the further back it goes. The tympanic bulla is similar to that of other basilosaurids. Some parts of the lower jaw are also known.

=== Dentition ===
The teeth of Chrysocetus are described as broadly resembling those of other basilosaurids, consisting of simple caniniform incisors and canines and more complex premolars and molars that feature numerous accessory cusps before and after the main apex. The incisors are single-rooted and curve back, with their mesial side bearing strong carinae. The lingual surface, the surface facing inwards, bears vertical striations. Chrysocetus possessed four premolars in its upper jaw, the first three of which gradually increase in size until the fourth becomes smaller again. The first premolar is the most distinct of the four, only possessing a single root and appearing much more caniniform like the incisors. Still, unlike the mesial teeth, the root of the first premolar features a pronounced grove on both the buccal and lingual side of the root, a pronounced distal carina and a tiny cusp at its base. However, Chrysocetus' premolars lack the denticles on the cingula characteristic of Zygorhiza. The cheek teeth are overall described as narrow and gracile than those of Dorudon with comparably smooth tooth enamel. As with other basilosaurids, the premolars and molars feature accessory denticles that precede and follow the main apex of each tooth. In the case of C. fouadassii the fourth premolar of the dentary bears five such denticles on either side of the main apex, with the subsequent first dentary molar only bearing three and the second molar only featuring these accessory denticles behind the main apex. In C. healyorum the distal denticles, those behind the main apex are noticeably larger than those mesial to the main apex. The third lower premolar is thought to be the largest tooth in the jaw and possesses tall denticles that are well distinguished from the main apex.

=== Vertebrae and ribcage ===
The cervical vertebrae appear similar to those of other basilosaurids. The dorsal arch of the atlas is perforated by large foramina on either side and the axis is notably taller than all other neck vertebrae, owing to its robust neural spine. The subsequent vertebrae show a gradual increase in size and differ from those of protocetids by having less compressed vertebral bodies. The epiphyses are attached to their respective vertebrae, but not fully fused, nor are the cervicals fused to each other. The sixth cervical vertebra has been noted for having enlarged parapophyses. Both the cervicals of C. healyorum and those of C. fouadassii are similar in most aspects of their anatomy, but can be distinguished by the fact that the African species has significantly longer vertebral centra.

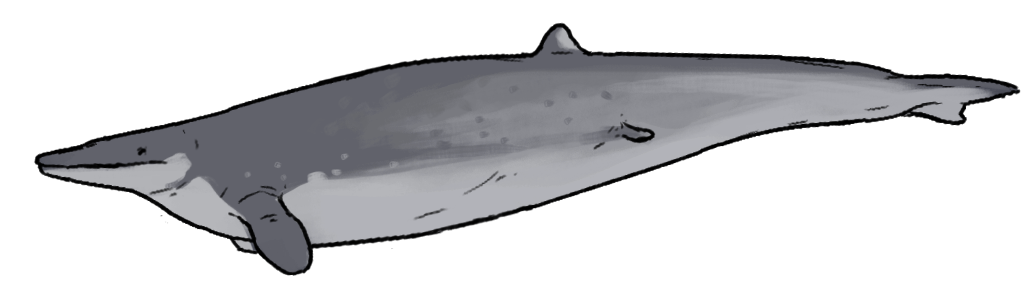
Life reconstruction of Chrysocetus healyorum, showing how its body was much more compact than that of Basilosaurus.

The Chrysocetus holotype preserves 12 thoracic vertebrae, with Uhen and Gingerich arguing that many more were likely to have been present and were simply not recovered alongside the other material. This is supported by the number of thoracic vertebrae in other dorudontines, as Dorudon atrox possessed 17, while 15 thoracic vertebrae are known from Zygorhiza kochii. According to Uhen and Gingerich, the first 10 of these recovered vertebrae appear to have formed a continuous series. Each of these early vertebrae preserves two costal fovea, articular surfaces that receive the ribs, with the tenth vertebra showing that they were much more closely set to each other than in any of the prior ones. The next known vertebra is only preserved through a pair of transverse processes. Similar transverse processes are known from the later thoracic vertebrae of Dorudon, specifically the earliest thoracic with only a single costal fovea. Therefore, its hypothesized that this specific vertebra was either the 11th or 12th in Chrysocetus. Finally, the caudal-most thoracic vertebra known from Chrysocetus has wide transverse processes and a singular articular facet for the ribs on either side. Unlike in the previous vertebrae, the height and width of the body are nearly the same, which resembles the anatomy of the lumbar vertebrae. Though the precise position of this vertebra is uncertain, it may have been the 13th vertebra in the thoracic series or positioned even further back.

The lumbars are only poorly preserved, but appear to be as long as they are wide and tall as already hinted at by the posterior thoracic vertebrae. This is an important feature that clearly distinguishes Chrysocetus and other dorudontines from basilosaurines, which have highly elongated lumbar vertebrae. The transverse processes emerge from the lower section of the lumbars and are angled downward. The pedicles that sit atop the lumbar vertebrae are almost as long as the vertebral body, but shifted towards the front. The number of lumbars is unknown and no sacral or caudal vertebrae were found along the holotype specimen. Overall the thoratic, lumbar and caudal vertebrae are noted for being relatively "normal" in their proportions, lacking the elongation seen in animals like Saghacetus and most prominent in Basilosaurus.

Three fragments of the sternum are part of the holotype specimen, one belonging to the manubrium and two more of the main sternal body. Overall elements of the sternum are thickened and have articular surfaces that are covered by spongy bone. The manubrium specifically, the front-most element of the sternum, is elongated and widens in the direction of the animals head. About two thirds down its length the manubrium is slightly bendt and its caudal end, which connects to the rest of the sternum, is described as U-shaped. The elements of the sternal body are only fragments of the entire bone, but appear flattened towards the front with concave upper and lower surfaces. The second fragment, which would have been further away from the manubrium than the other known piece, has articular surfaces that nearly wrap all around the element. Unlike the manubrium, these elements are straight and do not feature a dorsal bend.

The ribs are not too different from those of other dorudontines. The first few ribs are short and stout, but towards the back of the body they grow gradually longer until reaching their greatest length around the fifth or sixth rib. The early ribs further feature both heads and tubercles, with the latter being lost somewhere around the tenth rib. Internally, the ribs lack the medullary cavity that would contain bone marrow and are instead filled with spongy bone. While the ribs are slightly pachyostotic, meaning the layers of bone are thickened, they are not osteosclerotic, so the bone itself is not denser than in other archaeocetes as is the case in the subfamily Pachycetinae.

=== Appendicular skeleton ===
The shoulder blade of Chrysocetus is generally similar to those of other basilosaurids and modern whales. The fan-shaped scapula bears three well developed fossae, the supraspinous, infraspinous and teres fossae, with the infraspinous being much larger than the supraspinous fossa. These two areas are separated from another by a ridge of bone known as the spine, which gives rise to a flattened acromion process. The acromion is bent so that it immediately faces towards the direction of the skull. The coracoid process, which emerges from the neck of the scapula, is noticeably shorter and more robust but also faces towards the animals skull and is fused to the neck just as the acromion is. The coracoid meets the shallow glenoid cavity, which faces downward and receives the head of the humerus.

The humerus is most similar to that of Zygorhiza kochii and more gracile than that of Dorudon. The proximal epiphyses of the humerus, which contains both the hemispherical head as well as both lesser and greater tubercles, is not fused to the shaft. However, while this is seen in both species, this state of fusion is regarded as an ontogenetic feature that would be lost as the animal grows older. The head is slightly directed towards the back and extends equally as far towards the scapula as both tubercles. Further towards the distal end of the bone, the shaft forms a large deltopectoral crest which extends across nearly the entirety of the shaft. The deltapectoral crest is the part of the humerus that extends the furthest cranially (i.e. in the direction of the skull), a point reached about two thirds down from the proximal end. Finally, the distal end is much simpler in its anatomy, bearing only a single trochlea that connects to the bones of the forearm. This articular facet is described as being narrow and cylindrical. The humerus is one of the key elements that differentiates the North American species, C. healyorum, from the Moroccan C. fouadassii, as in the latter this bone is significantly longer. Discounting the proximal epiphysis, the humerus of C. fouadassii measures up to 22.5 cm (8.9 in) in length, compared to only 15.6 cm (6.1 in) in C. healyorum, which results in a difference in length of approximately 40%.

=== Pelvic bones ===
The pelvic bones, as in other basilosaurids, form a single fused element known as the innominate. In Chrysocetus the pubis is greatly elongated, the ilium highly reduced and the ischium mostly unknown due to breakage. The ilium is reduced to the point that it is only represented by a small process and a part of the acetabulum, clearly setting it apart from the better developed ilium seen in the more basal archaeocete Rhodocetus. This process is however very similar to that of Basilosaurus, other than the fact that it is noticeably narrower. Less is known about the ischium, given that most of the bone was destroyed in the holotype. Like the ilium and the pubis, it contributes to the acetabulum and further plays a rolle in forming the obturator foramen alongside the pubis. The dorsal side bears a protuberance not seen in other cetaceans or mammals but likely served as a point of attachment for musculature and ligament, which in life would have held the pelvic bones in place.

The most prominent of the main three pelvic elements is the pubis, which is greatly elongated. Like the ischium and ilium, the pubis too contributes to the acetabulum, and it forms the anterior edge of the obturator foramen. Towards the front the pubis bears a sharp edge on top and a thickened outer wall towards the bottom, the two regions enclosing an area that likely served as an attachment site of the rectus abdominus muscles, which much like the protuberance on the ischium serve to keep the hips in place. In land mammals the pectineus muscles, responsible for the adduction of the femur, would also attach in this region, but while Uhen and Gingerich suggests that some mobility of the hindlimbs may have been retained the presence of this particular muscle is doubted. Still, the anatomy of the acetabulum also suggests that the hip joints would have been functional in Chrysocetus.

=== Size ===
Chrysocetus was a small dorudontine that has repeatedly been considered to be one of the smallest members of Basilosauridae. The only taxa even smaller are Saghacetus and Tutcetus, both from the Fayum depression of Egypt, measuring 4 m (13 ft) and 2.51 m (8 ft 3 in) respectively.

== Ontogeny and evolutionary significance ==
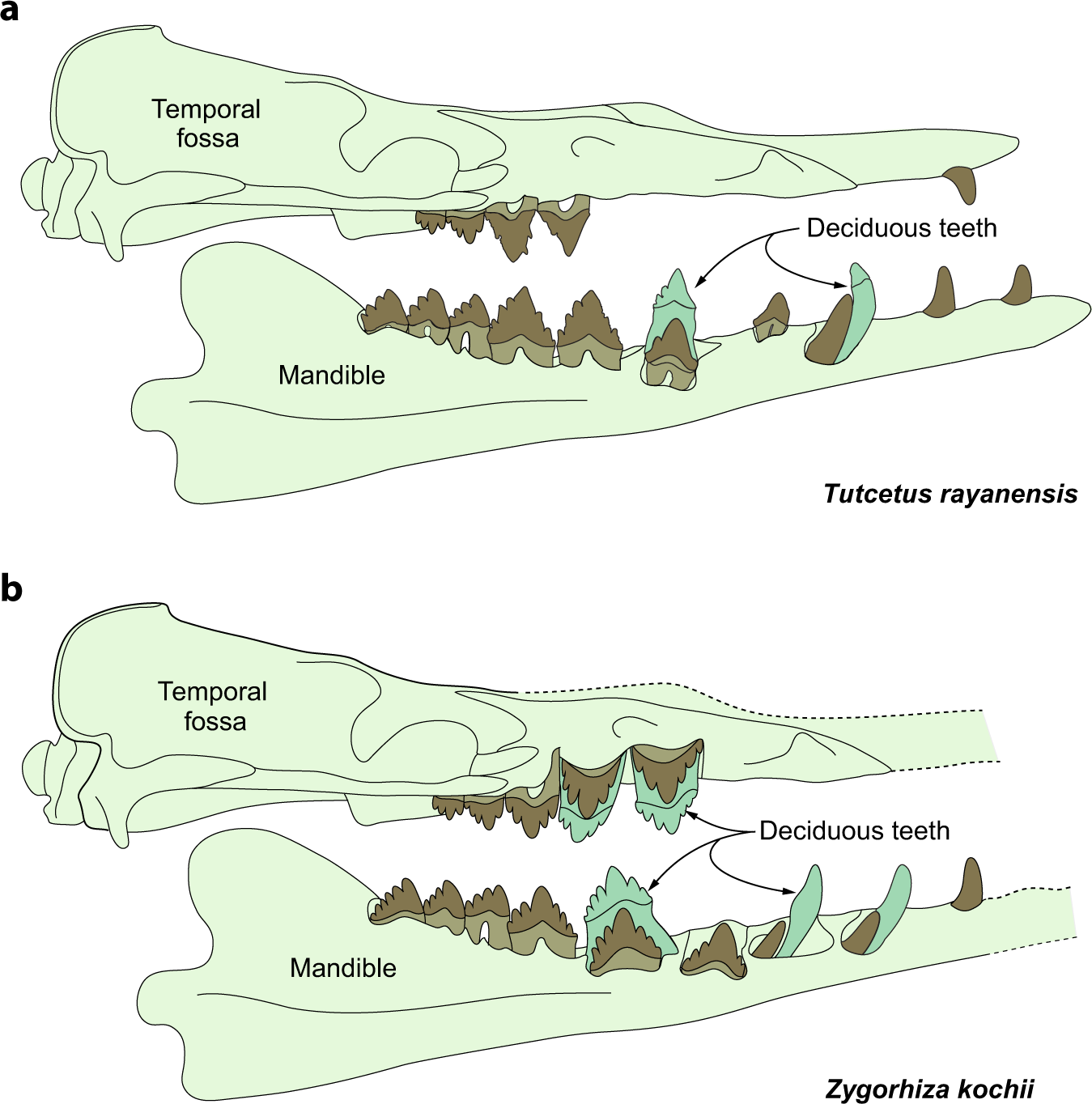
While other early whales like Tutcetus (top) and Zygorhiza (bottom) are known to have shed their teeth as they grow, the same was seemingly not the case for Chrysocetus.

The holotype specimen of Chrysocetus shows mixed signs of maturity. Several sutures of the skull are still open and the supraoccipital and parietal are only partially fused to each other. Similarly, the epiphyses of the neck vertebrae, though firmly attached, are not fully fused to the vertebral bodies, while those of the thoracic vertebrae range from being attached loosely to not being connected at all. Likewise, the epiphyses of the limb bones were unfused as well. While these are clear signs of skeletal immaturity, meaning the animal was not fully grown at the time of its death, the teeth appear to contradict this notion.

The teeth are firmly anchored in the jaw, their roots being closed and showing no signs of resorption while also facing each other, whereas the roots of the deciduous teeth in dorudontines splay outward. So while the skeletal fusion indicates that the individual was a subadult, the dentition already represented the adult condition. This becomes especially noticeable when comparing Chrysocetus to the other dorudontines known from subadult material, in which the same stage of skeletal fusion corresponds to the early stages of adult tooth eruption. Specific comparison has been drawn between the holotype of Chrysocetus with its already adult dentition to an individual of Dorudon atrox in which the adult molars had only just begun to erupt and an individual of Zygorhiza kochii with almost complete eruption of the adult teeth. This comparison has shown that, despite having much more advanced tooth development, the holotype of Chrysocetus would fall in-between the two aforementioned archaeocete individuals in terms of age.

This could indicate one of two conditions. It is possible that though maintaining their ancestral diphyondonty (deciduous teeth are replaced by permanent teeth later in life), Chrysocetus did so much sooner in life than other early whales. However, it has also been hypothesized that Chrysocetus could have been monophyodont, meaning that like in modern whales, they only ever developed a single set of teeth throughout their life. This condition is present in all odontocetes, both extant and extinct, as well as baleen whales, although the latter resorb their teeth while still in the womb. This may also have implications for the origins of polydonty seen in odontocetes. One hypothesis to explain the increase in tooth count in odontocetes was that ancestral toothed whales may have simply kept their deciduous teeth while adult teeth would erupt between them. However, should Chrysocetus be truly monophyodont, then the loss of deciduous teeth this early in evolutionary history would discount this hypothesis. An additional piece of counter evidence comes from basal mysticetes, which likewise developed an increased tooth count while showing no evidence of retaining morphologically distinct deciduous teeth.

== Phylogeny ==
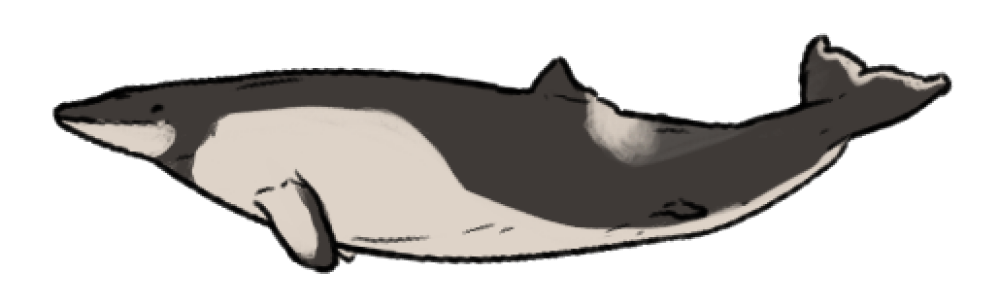
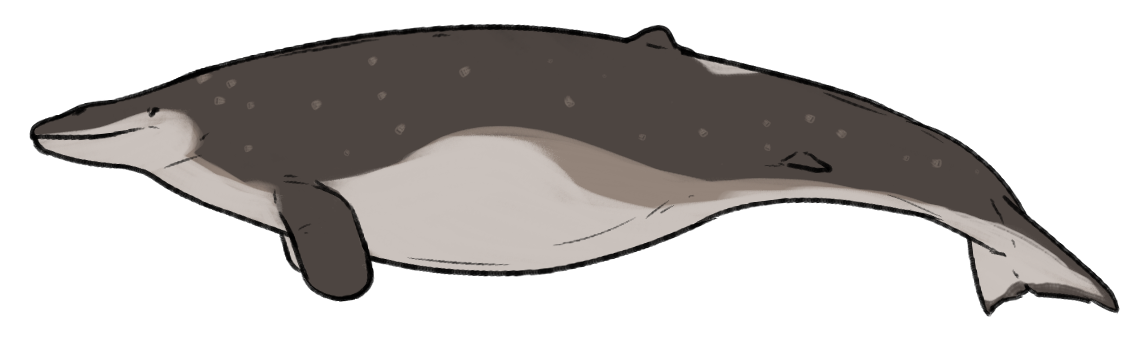
Though its phylogenetic position relative to other early whales has shifted over time, a 2023 study suggests that Chrysocetus may have been closely related to the small basilosaurids Ocucajea and Tutcetus.

The initial phylogenetic tree featured in the type description of Chrysocetus was the result of statocladistics, meaning that morphological data was used in combination with the stratigraphy of the fossil remains. In this tree basilosaurids were recovered as a paraphyletic group basal to modern whales, with each taxon gradually leading to crown cetaceans. Basilosaurus was recovered as the basalmost member of this group, with Dorudontinae including the last common ancestor of Zygorhiza and Dorudon and all its descendants sans mysticetes and odontocetes. In this study, Chrysocetus, on account of its advanced tooth development, was found to be the most derived dorudontine and possibly ancestral to modern whales. A similar conclusion was reached by Uhen in his 2009 chapter in the book "Encyclopedia of Marine Mammals", though the precise internal relationships of basilosaurids differ from those recovered previously.

- - †Pakicetidae
  - - †Ambulocetidae
    - - †Remingtonocetidae
      - - †Protocetidae
        - Basilosauridae
          - Basilosaurinae
            - †Cynthiacetus
            - - †Basiloterus
              - †Basilosaurus
          - Dorudontinae
            - - †Dorudon
              - †Ancalecetus
            - - †Zygorhiza
              - - †Saghacetus
                - - †Chrysocetus
                  - - Mysticeti
                    - Odontoceti

The interpretation of Chrysocetus as a close relative of modern whales is contrasted by the phylogenetic tree produced by Antar and colleagues in 2023. In their study, Chrysocetus appears as one of the basalmost dorudontines, clading together with Tutcetus from Africa and Ocucajea from South America. Within this clade Chrysocetus has been recovered as the basalmost genus, sitting outside of the clade formed by the other two. This interpretation would go against the idea that the monophyodonty in Chrysocetus is the direct precursor to the same condition in crown-cetaceans. Another difference to the original interpretation of Chrysocetus position within basilosaurids stems from the fact that Antar and colleagues recover a more contained Basilosauridae, with most taxa sans pachycetines and Eocetus forming a monophyletic group that includes not only the Tutcetus-clade but also Dorudon, Basilosaurus and other traditional basilosaurids.

- Pelagiceti
  - Eocetus
  - - - - Chrysocetus
        - - Ocucajea
          - Tutcetus
      - - Zygorhiza
        - - - Saghacetus
            - Ancalecetus
          - - Basilosaurus
            - - Dorudon
              - Pontogeneus peruvianus
    - - - Supayacetus
        - - Pachycetus paulsonii
          - - Pachycetus wardii
            - Antaecetus aithai
      - Neoceti

== Paleoecology ==
C. fouadassii lived in the Aridal Formation, located in what is now Western Sahara. Specifically, fossils of this species were recovered from the locality of Gueran, which is renowned for its diverse archaeocete fauna. A total of six early whales were discovered there, belonging to the families Protocetidae and Basilosauridae, all of which varying considerably in their size. Chrysocetus fouadassii was among the smallest of the Gueran whales, with the only smaller animal being an unnamed protocetid. A second unnamed protocetid was also found and is thought to have been larger than Chrysocetus. Even larger were Pappocetus and Antaecetus, a protocetid and basilosaurid respectively, as well as the basilosaurid Eocetus schweinfurthii, which represents the largest whale from the locality. The Gueran locality is regarded as representing an environment of the neritic zone, deposited above a shallow marine shelf. Other fossil remains point towards the presence of sharks of the genera Otodus and Carcharocles as well as crocodilians, turtles and various fish, though sirenian fossils have so far not been recovered.
