= Piney Point Formation =

- Stratigraphic range: Lutetian
- Type: Formation
- Unit of: Trent Supergroup
- Underlies: Old Church Formation
- Overlies: Nanjemoy Formation

Location
- Region: Virginia
- Country: United States

The Piney Point Formation is a geologic formation in Virginia. It preserves fossils dating back to the Lutetian Stage of the Eocene Epoch of the Paleogene period.

== Species ==
The following species are known from this formation. Keep in mind, this formation is vastly understudied, so the fauna represented is poorly known.

=== Chondrichthyans ===
- Carcharocles auriculatus
- Galeocerdo eaglesomi
- Nebrius thielensis
- Striatolamia macrota
- Carcharias hopei
- Carcharias acutissima
- Jaekelotodus trigonalis
- Isurus praecursor
- Scyliorhinus gilbberti
- Abdounia beaugei
- Abdounia lapierrei
- Abdounia recticona
- Adbounia spp.
- Galeocerdo latidens
- Hemipristis curvatus?
- Carcarhinus gibbesi
- Galeorhinus ypresiensis
- Galeorhinus sp.
- Physogaleus secundus
- Coupatezia woutersi
- Pristis lathami
- Rhynchobatus vincenti
- Rhinobatis bruxelliensis
- Aetobatus irregularis
- Myliobatis dixoni
- Myliobatis spp.

=== Chelonians ===
- Allaeochelys sp.

=== Cetaceans ===
- Basilotritus woodwardi

=== Invertebrates ===
- Cubitostrea sellaeformis
- Anomia lisbonensis
- Plicatula fliamentosa
- "Pecten" sp. (At least 3 distinct species)
- Glycymeris lisbonensis
- Leda semen
- Leda coelatella
- Venericardia rotunda
- Macrocallista perovata
- Anapteris regalis
- Caestocorbula fossata
- Corbula sp.
- Turritella nasuta
- Dentalium sp. (at least 2 distinct species)

== See also ==
- List of fossiliferous stratigraphic units in Virginia
- Paleontology in Virginia
