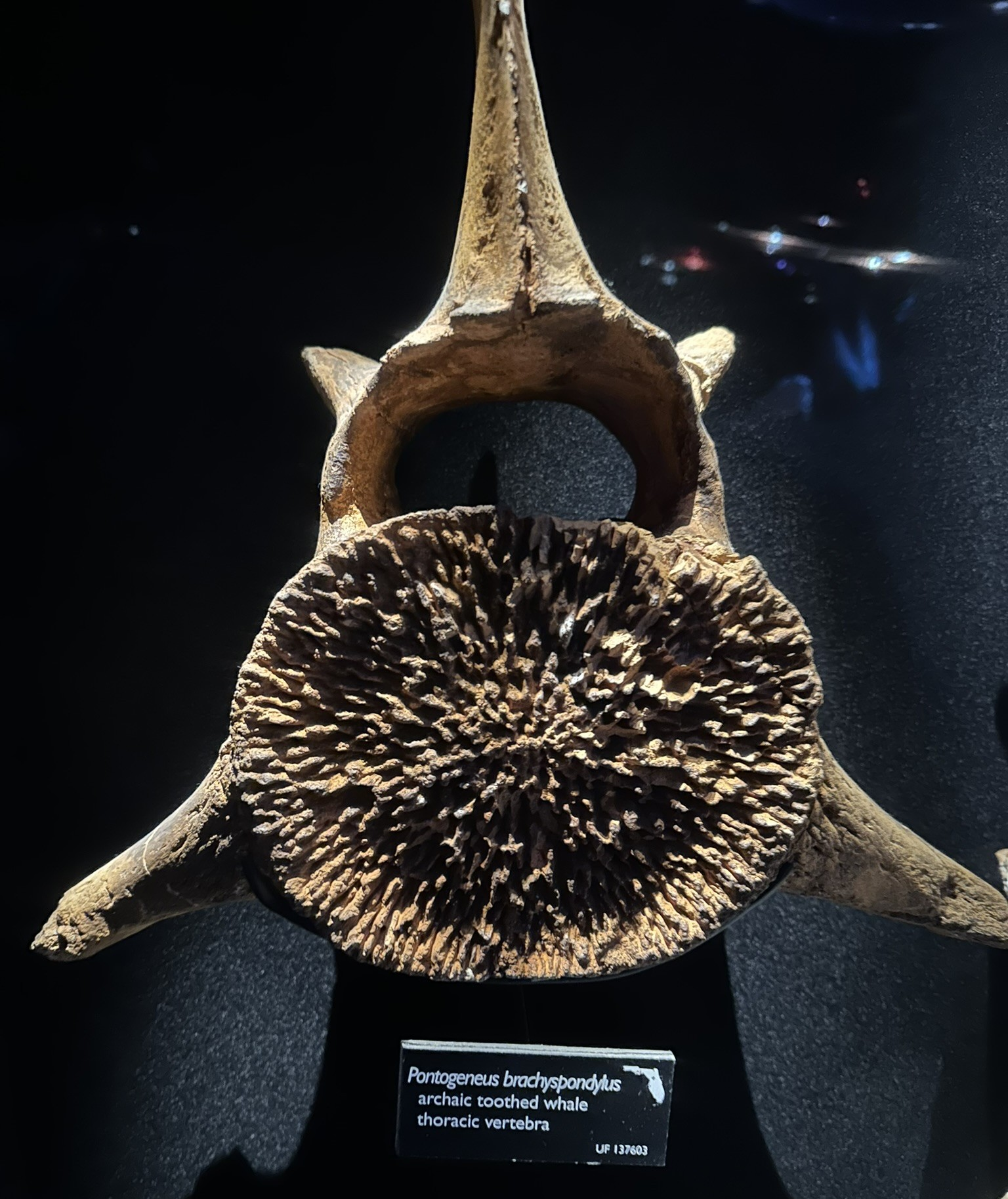
- "P. brachyspondylus" vertebra, Florida Museum of Natural History

Scientific classification
- Kingdom: Animalia
- Phylum: Chordata
- Class: Mammalia
- Order: Artiodactyla
- Infraorder: Cetacea
- Family: †Basilosauridae
- Genus: †Pontogeneus; Leidy, 1852
- Species: †P. priscus

Binomial name
- †Pontogeneus priscus Leidy, 1852

Synonyms
- Hydrarchos? Koch, 1845; Zeuglodon brachyspondylus (Müller 1849)

= Pontogeneus =

Pontogeneus Temporal range: Bartonian–Priabonian

Genus of mammals

Pontogeneus (nomen dubium) is a genus of extinct cetacean known from fossils recovered from the Late Eocene sediments (Bartonian-Priabonian stages) of the southeastern United States (most notably Alabama and Florida).

== Classification ==
When "Zeuglodon" brachyspondylus was formerly included, Pontogeneus was depicted as having a skeleton similar to that of Basilosaurus cetoides, although the posterior thoracic vertebrae, the lumbar vertebrae, and the anterior caudal vertebrae had proportions closer to those seen in members of the archaeocete Subfamily Dorudontinae.

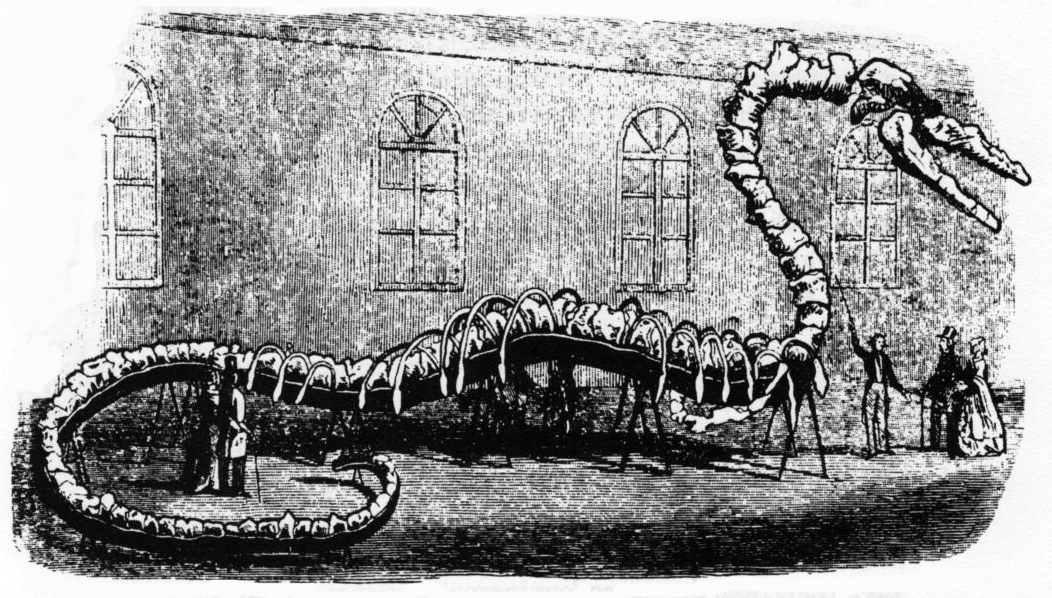
Albert Koch's "Hydrarchos" fossil skeleton from 1845

== Taxonomic history ==
In 1852, Joseph Leidy had erected Pontogeneus priscus based on the centrum of a single cervical vertebra in the collections of the Academy of Natural Sciences in Philadelphia. Leidy noted that the centrum had been collected from exposures along the Washita River in Louisiana. Kellogg 1936 synonymized these two taxa to form Pontogeneus brachyspondylus which he listed as incertae sedis.

Uhen 2005 designated Pontogeneus priscus and Zeuglodon brachyspondylus to be nomina dubia based on the lack of diagnostic characters that distinguish the type specimens from other basilosaurids. While Pontogeneus priscus is no longer considered valid, "Z." brachyspondylus appears similar to Masracetus from Egypt (which was also referred to Z. brachyspondylus in the past) and may represent either a species of Masracetus or a distinct and closely related but as-yet-unnamed genus.

== Formerly assigned to Pontogeneus ==
"Zeuglodon brachyspondylus" (Müller 1849) was erected for several vertebrae collected in either Choctaw or Washington counties in southern Alabama.

Basilosaurid remains from Egypt were tentatively assigned to Zeuglodon brachyspondylus based on superficial similarities to the syntype series (under the old hypothesis of synonymy of Pontogeneus and Zeuglodon brachyspondylus). However, these remains were given their own genus, Masracetus, given minor differences from "Z." brachyspondylus.
