= Birket Qarun Formation =

Geological formation in Egypt

- Stratigraphic range: Eocene; ~41.2–33.9 Ma
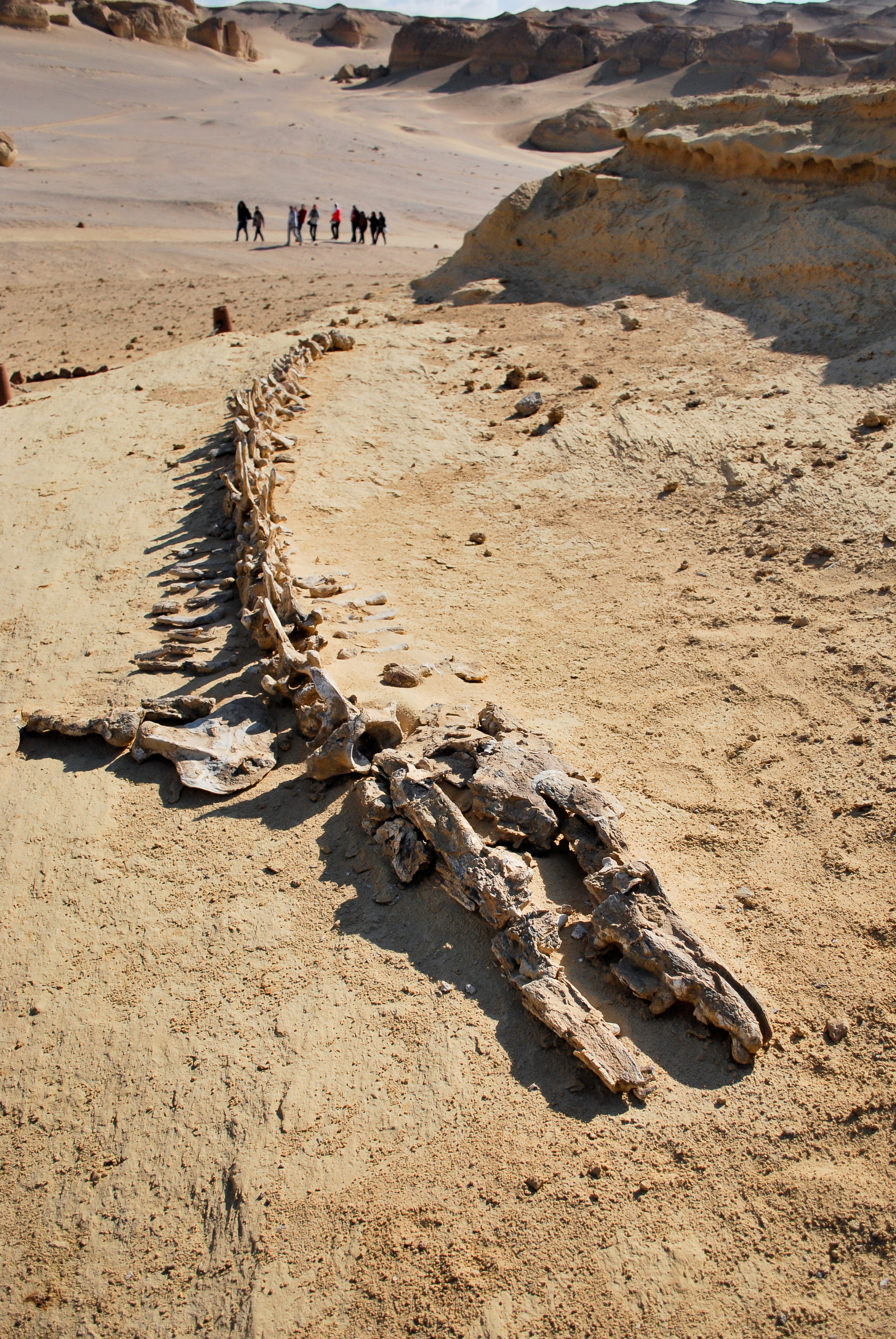
- Type: Sedimentary
- Underlies: Qasr el Sagha Formation
- Overlies: Gehannam Formation
- Thickness: up to 50 metres (160 ft)

Lithology
- Primary: Sandstone, claystone, shale, limestone

Location
- Region: Faiyum Governorate
- Country: Egypt

The Birket Qarun Formation is an Eocene aged formation in Egypt. It is part of the famous Wadi al Hitan. Notable fossils include the ancient whales Basilosaurus and Dorudon as well as sirenians Eotheroides and Eosiren. It also contains the teeth of various sharks and reptiles. The area was likely a mix of both marine and freshwater area with many freshwater deposits being found alongside a marine influence from the Tethys Sea. Fossils here also preserve a shallow marine nursery for the whale Dorudon and it seems that this area would have also been the site of active predation from Basilosaurus as it attacked the newly born Dorudon calves.

== Paleobiota ==
=== Molluscs ===
Several supposed rizholiths and rizhomes have been re-interpreted as burrows made by burrowing bivalves.

| Genus | Species | Member | Locality | Material | Notes | Images |
|---|---|---|---|---|---|---|
| Amaea (Acrila) | niloatica | Temple Member | Gebel Gehannam | Shells | A Wentletrap | |
| Acanthocardia (Schedocardia) | gehannamensis | Temple Member | Gebel Gehannam | Shells | A Carditid | |
| Carolia | placunoides | Temple Member | Gebel Gehannam | Shells | A Scallop | |
| Claibornicardia | pharaonum | Temple Member | Garet Gehannam | Shells | A Carditid | |
| Cubitostrea | multicostata | Temple Member | Gebel Gehannam | Shells | An Oyster | |
| Ostrea | reili, fraasi, roncana | Temple Member | Gebel Gehannam | Shells | An Oyster | |
| Turritella (Torquesia) | pharaonica | Temple Member | Gebel Gehannam | Shells | A Turritellidae | |

=== Actinopterygians ===
| Genus | Species | Member | Locality | Material | Notes | Images |
|---|---|---|---|---|---|---|
| Gymnarchus | sp. | Umm Rigl Member | Birket Qarun | Isolated remains | A Mormyridae elephantfish | |
| Hydrocynus | sp. | Umm Rigl Member | Birket Qarun | Isolated remains | An Alestid | |
| Qarmoutus | hitanensis | Umm Rigl Member | Birket Qarun | Isolated remains | A sea catfish | |
| Mochokidae | indeterminate | Umm Rigl Member | Birket Qarun | Isolated remains | Catfish | |
| Perciformes | indeterminate | Umm Rigl Member | Birket Qarun | Isolated remains | Perch | |
| Polypterus | sp. | Umm Rigl Member | Birket Qarun | Isolated remains | A Bichir | |

=== Dipnomorphs ===
| Genus | Species | Member | Locality | Material | Notes | Images |
|---|---|---|---|---|---|---|
| Protopterus | elongus | Umm Rigl Member | Birket Qarun | Isolated tooth plates | A Protopterid | |

=== Chondrichthyes ===
| Genus | Species | Member | Locality | Material | Notes | Images |
|---|---|---|---|---|---|---|
| Abdounia | sp. | Temple Member | Wadi Hitan | Teeth | A Requiem shark | |
| Aetobatus | sp. | Temple Member | Wadi Hitan | Teeth | A Stingray | |
| Alopias | sp. | Temple Member | Wadi Hitan | Teeth | A Thresher shark | |
| Anoxypristis | mucrodens, sp. | Temple Member | Wadi Hitan | Teeth | A Sawfish | |
| Brachycarcharias | cf. twiggsensis | Temple Member | Wadi Hitan | Teeth | A Sand tiger shark | |
| Burnhamia | sp. | Temple Member | Wadi Hitan | Teeth | A Mobulid | |
| Carcharias | aff. twiggsensis, sp. | Temple Member | Wadi Hitan | Teeth | A Sand shark | |
| Carcharhinus | sp. | Temple Member | Wadi Hitan | Teeth | A Requiem shark | |
| Chiloscyllium | sp. | Temple Member | Wadi Hitan | Teeth | A Carpet shark | |
| Coupatezia | wousteri, attiai, sp. | Temple Member | Wadi Hitan | Teeth | A Stingray | |
| Crassescyliorhinus | sp. | Temple Member | Wadi Hitan | Teeth | A Scyliorhinid | |
| Dasyatidae | Indeterminate | Temple Member | Wadi Hitan | Teeth | A Whiptail stingray | |
| Eoplinthicus | sp. | Temple Member | Wadi Hitan | Teeth | An Eagle ray | |
| Galeocerdo | sp. | Temple Member | Wadi Hitan | Teeth | A Tiger shark | |
| Gymnura | sp. | Temple Member | Wadi Hitan | Teeth | A Stingray | |
| Hemipristis | sp. | Temple Member | Wadi Hitan | Teeth | A Hemigaleid | |
| Hexanchus | sp. | Temple Member | Wadi Hitan | Teeth | A Sixgill shark | |
| Himantura | sp. | Temple Member | Wadi Hitan | Teeth | A Stingray | |
| Leptocharias | sp. | Temple Member | Wadi Hitan | Teeth | A Hemigaleid | |
| Lophobatis | sp. | Temple Member | Wadi Hitan | Teeth | An Eagle ray | |
| Macrorhizodus | praecursor | Temple Member | Wadi Hitan | Teeth | A Lamnid | |
| Megascyliorhinus | sp. | Temple Member | Wadi Hitan | Teeth | A Scyliorhinid | |
| Moerigaleus | vitreodon | Temple Member | Wadi Hitan | Teeth | A Hemigaleid | |
| Myliobatis | sp. | Temple Member | Wadi Hitan | Teeth | An Eagle ray | |
| Narcine | sp. | Temple Member | Wadi Hitan | Teeth | A Numbfish | |
| Nebrius | sp. | Temple Member | Wadi Hitan | Teeth | A Nurse shark | |
| Neotrygon | sp. | Temple Member | Wadi Hitan | Teeth | A Whiptail stingray | |
| Negaprion | frequens, amekiensis, sp. | Temple Member | Wadi Hitan | Teeth | A Lemon shark | |
| Odontorhytis | aff. pappenheimi | Temple Member | Wadi Hitan | Teeth | Indet. elasmobranch | |
| Otodus | sokolovi | Temple Member | Wadi Hitan | Teeth | An Otodontid | |
| Ouledia | sp. | Temple Member | Wadi Hitan | Teeth | A Stingray | |
| Pastinachus | sp. | Temple Member | Wadi Hitan | Teeth | A Whiptail stingray | |
| Physogaleus | sp. | Temple Member | Wadi Hitan | Teeth | A Requiem shark | |
| Platyrhina | sp. | Temple Member | Wadi Hitan | Teeth | A Guitarfish | |
| Platyrhinoidis | sp. | Temple Member | Wadi Hitan | Teeth | A Guitarfish | |
| Propristis | schweinfurthi, lathami, sp. | Temple Member | Wadi Hitan | Teeth | A Sawfish | |
| Rhinoptera | sp. | Temple Member | Wadi Hitan | Teeth | A Cownose ray | |
| Rhizoprionodon | sp. | Temple Member | Wadi Hitan | Teeth | A Sharpnose shark | |
| Rhynchobatus | sp. | Temple Member | Wadi Hitan | Teeth | A Wedgefish | |
| Squatina | sp. | Temple Member | Wadi Hitan | Teeth | An Angelshark | |
| Stegostoma | sp. | Temple Member | Wadi Hitan | Teeth | A Zebra shark | |
| Scyliorhinidae | Indeterminate | Temple Member | Wadi Hitan | Teeth | A Scyliorhinid | |
| Torpedo | sp. | Temple Member | Wadi Hitan | Teeth | A Torpedinid | |
| Triakidae | Indeterminate | Temple Member | Wadi Hitan | Teeth | A Houndshark | |
| Triakis | sp. | Temple Member | Wadi Hitan | Teeth | A Houndshark | |

=== Crocodylomorphs ===
| Genus | Species | Member | Locality | Material | Notes | Images |
|---|---|---|---|---|---|---|
| Crocodyliformes | indeterminate | Umm Rigl Member | Birket Qarun | DPC 24618 and 21120 | Indeterminate Crocodrile material | |
| Gavialoidea | indeterminate | Umm Rigl Member | Birket Qarun | DPC 24708 and 24343 | Indeterminate Crocodrile material | |
| Sebecosuchia | indeterminate | Umm Rigl Member | Birket Qarun | DPC 20814 | Indeterminate Ziphosuchian material | |
| Eogavialis | africanum | Temple Member | Birket-el-Qurun | CGM 9350 - type (skull) | A Tomistomine | |

=== Testudines ===
| Genus | Species | Member | Locality | Material | Notes | Images |
|---|---|---|---|---|---|---|
| Cordichelys | antiqua, sp. | Temple Member | Wadi Hitan | A partial skull, mostly complete shell, and partial pelves; UMMP 97531, a mostly complete, well-preserved lower jaw | A Podocnemididae sideneck turtle | |
| Dacquemys | paleomorpha | Temple Member | Dimeh | SMNS 12645 | A Podocnemididae sideneck turtle | |

=== Squamates ===
| Genus | Species | Member | Locality | Material | Notes | Images |
|---|---|---|---|---|---|---|
| Amphisbaenia | indeterminate | Umm Rigl Member | Birket Qarun | MUVP 453, an isolated presacral vertebra | Indeterminate legless squamate | |
| Booid | "taxon A", "taxon B" | Umm Rigl Member | Birket Qarun | 1 left maxilla (DPC 21241), 3 anterior trunk vertebrae (DPC 25605, 25643, and 25655), 17 mid-trunk vertebrae (DPC 25603, 25606, 25613, 25618, 25619, 25628, 25635, 25642, 25644 to 25646, 25649, 25660, 25670, 25671, 25684, and 25690), 4 posterior trunk vertebrae (DPC 25623, 25673, 25685, and 25686); 7 mid-trunk vertebrae (DPC 25610, 25614, 25615, 25629, 25639, 25651, and 25652), 5 posterior trunk vertebrae (DPC 25621, 25622, 25638, 25662, and 25672) | Indeterminate boa material | |
| Caenophidia | indeterminate | Umm Rigl Member | Birket Qarun | 1 "badly eroded partial vertebra" (DPC 25679) | Indeterminate snake material | |
| Gigantophis | garstini | Umm Rigl Member | Birket Qarun | 1 "giant" mid-trunk vertebra (DPC 25616), 1 "large" juvenile mid-trunk vertebra (DPC 25641) | A giant madtsoiid snake | |
| Procerophis | sp. | Umm Rigl Member | Birket Qarun | MUVP 454, an isolated mid- trunk vertebra | Indeterminate legless squamate | |
| Pterosphenus | schweinfurthi | Umm Rigl Member | Birket Qarun | 5 anterior trunk vertebrae (DPC 21270, 21287, 24291, 25666, and 25667), 4 mid-trunk vertebrae (DPC 25607, 25630, 25668, and 25680) | A Palaeophiidae sea snake | |
| Renenutet | enmerwer, sp. | Umm Rigl Member | Birket Qarun | holotype: GCM 83731, a mid-trunk vertebra; paratypes: DPC 25657, a mid-trunk vertebra, and DPC 25627, a posterior trunk vertebra; referred specimens: 7 mid-trunk vertebrae (DPC 25609, 25611, 25633, 25640, 25656, 25657, and 25687), 2 posterior trunk vertebrae (DPC 25602 and 25608); MUVP 455, mid-trunk vertebra (4.1 mm centrum length); MUVP 457, MUVP 458, MUVP 459, anterior caudal vertebrae (5.1 mm centrum length and 4.9 mm height of the neural arch and spine); MUVP 460, posterior caudal vertebra (2 mm centrum length). | A Colubroidea snake | |
| Russellophiid | indeterminate | Umm Rigl Member | Birket Qarun | 1 single mid-trunk vertebra (DPC 25663) | Indeterminate snake material | |
| Tropidophiid | indeterminate | Umm Rigl Member | Birket Qarun | 1 anterior trunk vertebra (DPC 25650), 3 mid-trunk vertebrae (DPC 25634, 25654, and 25664), 2 caudal vertebrae (DPC 25674 and 25692) | Indeterminate dwarf boa material | |
| Serpentes | indeterminate | Umm Rigl Member | Birket Qarun | DPC 25620, 25661, 25665 (Pterosphenus or Gigantophis?), 25677, 25678, 25689, 25691, 25693, and 2694, incomplete and/or strongly eroded vertebrae | Indeterminate snake material | |
| Varanus | sp. | Umm Rigl Member | Birket Qarun | Vertebrae: DPC 21355, one cervical, two trunk and two caudal; 21442, one caudal; 23257, two trunk and two caudal; 23258, four caudals; 23778, caudal | A Monitor lizard | |

=== Birds ===
| Genus | Species | Member | Locality | Material | Notes | Images |
|---|---|---|---|---|---|---|
| Eopelecanus | aegyptiacus | Temple Member | Garet Gehannam | MUVP 505, a limb element (right tibiotarsus) | An early species of pelican | |

=== Afrotheres ===
| Genus | Species | Member | Locality | Material | Notes | Images |
|---|---|---|---|---|---|---|
| Barytherium | grave | Temple Member | Birket Qarun | Partial mandible and isolated teeth | A member of Barytheriidae | |
| Dilambdogale | gheerbranti | Umm Rigl Member | Birket Qarun | CGM 66005 - holotype; referred material: DPC 23306E, 23307A, 23007H, 23736A, 23780C, 23784D, 23983C, 24001A, 24081B, 24103A and DPC 24108A | A Tenrecomorph | |
| Dimaitherium | patnaiki | Umm Rigl Member | Birket Qarun | Holotype: CGM 42206, partial left mandible | A Hyracoidean | |
| Eosiren | libyca, stromeri | Temple Member | Birket Qarun; Wadi al Hitan | Multiple articulated & isolated remains | A member of Dugongidae | |
| Eotheroides | clavigerum, sandersi | Temple Member | Birket Qarun; Wadi al Hitan | Multiple articulated & isolated remains | A member of Dugongidae | |
| Moeritherium | lyonsi | Temple Member | Birket Qarun | Partial mandible and isolated teeth | A member of Moeritheriidae | |

=== Marsupials ===
| Genus | Species | Member | Locality | Material | Notes | Images |
|---|---|---|---|---|---|---|
| Ghamidtherium | dimaiensis | Umm Rigl Member | Birket Qarun | GM 83699, a right dentary fragment including 2-3, and alveoli for M4 and one tooth anterior to M2 | A possible Didelphimorphian | |

=== Rodents ===
| Genus | Species | Member | Locality | Material | Notes | Images |
|---|---|---|---|---|---|---|
| Kabirmys | qarunensis | Umm Rigl Member | Birket Qarun | Isolated teeth, partial mandibles, and an edentulous partial maxilla | A Nementchamyidae rodent | |
| Protophiomys | aegyptensis, attiai | Umm Rigl Member | Birket Qarun | CGM 83695 - holotype; CGM 83690; referred material: DPC specimens | A Hystricognathi rodent | |
| Shazurus | minutus | Umm Rigl Member | Birket Qarun | CGM 83701, a left Molar; referred 15 teeth | A member of Anomalure | |

=== Bats ===
| Genus | Species | Member | Locality | Material | Notes | Images |
|---|---|---|---|---|---|---|
| Aegyptonycteris | knightae | Umm Rigl Member | Birket Qarun | CGM 83740, fragment of right maxilla with M2 and M3; only known specimen | A member of Aegyptonycteridae | |
| Qarunycteris | moerisae | Umm Rigl Member | Birket Qarun | CGM 83671, a tooth (right [upper] M2) | A member of Rhinopomatidae | |
| Witwatia | schlosseri, eremicus | Umm Rigl Member | Birket Qarun | GM 83668, left dentary with c1–m3; CGM 83669, left M1 or M2 | A member of Philisidae | |

=== Primates ===
| Genus | Species | Member | Locality | Material | Notes | Images |
|---|---|---|---|---|---|---|
| Afradapis | longicristatus | Umm Rigl Member | Birket Qarun | CGM 83690, partial left mandible preserving P4–M3 and masseteric fossa | A member of Caenopithecinae | |
| Biretia | fayumensis, megalopsis | Umm Rigl Member | Birket Qarun | CGM 83658, mandible with m2 and m3; CGM 83661, partial mandible with m2 and m3 | A Parapithecidae monkey | |
| Karanisia | clarki | Umm Rigl Member | Birket Qarun | CGM 40265, left mandible preserving M1 to M3 | A possible member of Lorisidae | |
| Masradapis | tahai | Umm Rigl Member | Birket Qarun | Mandibular, maxillary fragments and isolated teeth | A member of Caenopithecinae | |
| Nosmips | aenigmaticus | Umm Rigl Member | Birket Qarun | CGM 66002 - holotype | A primate of uncertain affinites | |
| Saharagalago | misrensis | Umm Rigl Member | Birket Qarun | CGM 40266, a left M1 | A member of Galagidae | |

=== Cetaceans ===
| Genus | Species | Member | Locality | Material | Notes | Images |
|---|---|---|---|---|---|---|
| Ancalecetus | simonsi | Temple Member | Wadi Hitan | CGM 42290, a partial skeleton | A Basilosauridae cetacean | |
| Basilosaurus | isis, cetoides | All Members | Dimeh SW; Birket Qarun; Garet el Naqb; Birket-el-Qurun; Garet Gehannam; Wadi Hitan | Multiple articulated & isolated remains | A Basilosauridae cetacean | |
| Dorudon | atrox | All Members | El Kenissa; Geziret el-Qarn; Qasr Qarun; Birket-el-Qurun; Wadi Hitan | Multiple articulated & isolated remains | A Basilosauridae cetacean | |
| Masracetus | markgrafi | Temple Member | Dimeh | SMNS 11414, a set of vertebrae (lumbar vertebrae); the associated skull is cataloged as SMNS 11413 | A Basilosauridae cetacean | |

=== Plants ===
Isolated Dicotyledon woods are known. Unidentified large woody roots are known.

| Genus | Species | Member | Locality | Material | Notes | Images |
|---|---|---|---|---|---|---|
| Avicennia? | marina? | Middle Member | Minqar El-Hut; Sandouk El-Borneta; Wadi Hitan | Type-1 rhizoliths | Mangrove plant (Avicenniaceae) | Extant representatives of the genus |
| Cymodocea | sp. | Temple Member | Qasr Qarun | Foliar remains; Type-3 rhizoliths | A marine Angiosperm (Cymodoceaceae) | Extant representatives of the genus |
| Detarioxylon | aegyptiacum | Middle Member | Birket Qarun | Wood | Terrestrial Angiosperm (Fabaceae) | |
| Nypa? | fruticans?, burtini? | Middle Member | Wadi Hitan | Rhizome casts; Leaf impression | Mangrove Palm (Arecaceae) | Extant representatives of the genus |
| Rhizophora | sp. | Middle Member | Minqar El-Hut; Sandouk El-Borneta; Wadi Hitan | Type-2 rhizoliths | Mangrove plant (Rhizophoraceae) | Extant representatives of the genus |
| Thalassodendron | sp. | Middle Member; Temple Member | Qasr Qarun; Wadi Hitan | Foliar remains; Type-3 rhizoliths | A marine Angiosperm (Cymodoceaceae) | Extant representatives of the genus |
