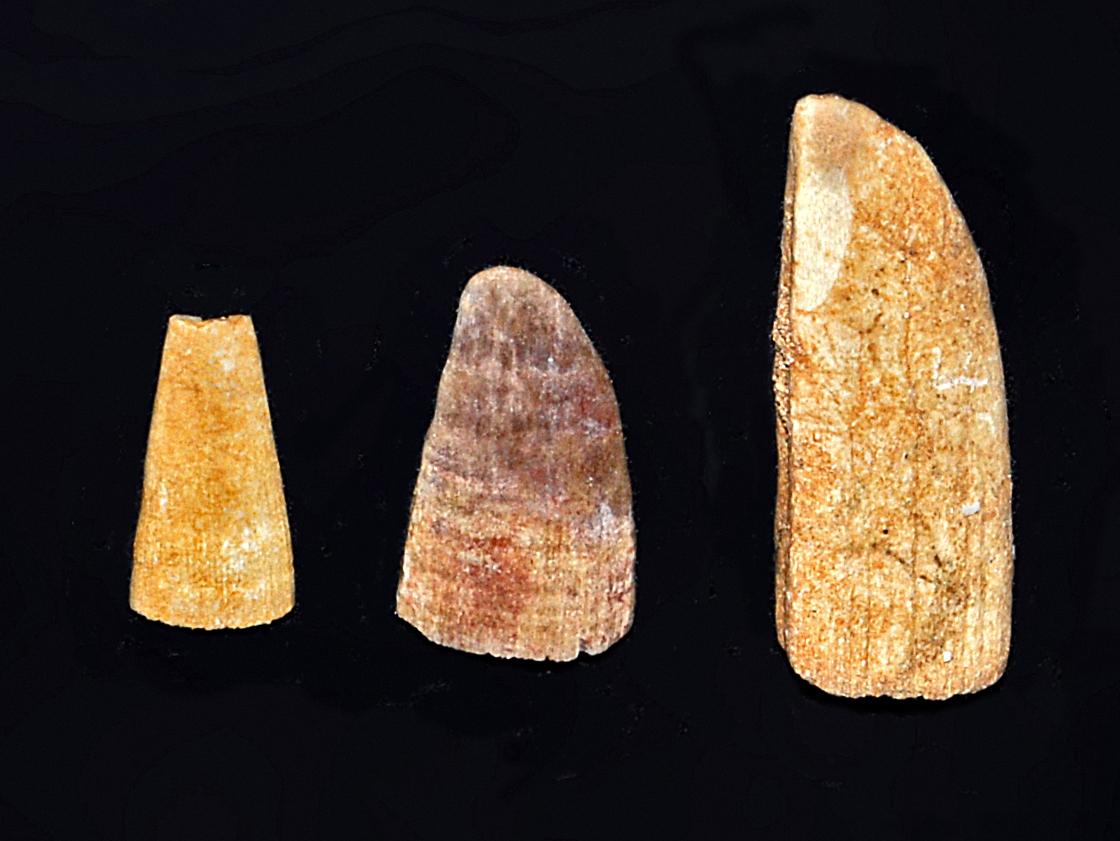
- Fossil rostal teeth of Pristis lathami from Khouribga

Scientific classification
- Kingdom: Animalia
- Phylum: Chordata
- Class: Chondrichthyes
- Subclass: Elasmobranchii
- Order: Rhinopristiformes
- Family: Pristidae
- Genus: Pristis
- Species: †P. lathami

Binomial name
- †Pristis lathami Galeotti, 1837

Synonyms
- Pristis bisulcatus Agassiz, 1836; Pristis parisiensis Gervais, 1852

= Pristis lathami =

Pristis lathami Temporal range: Eocene, 48.6–28.4 Ma

Species of extinct sawfish

Pristis lathami is a species of extinct sawfish in the family Pristidae. It lived in the Eocene era in areas including Egypt, Nigeria, Togo, the United Kingdom, the United States, and Western Sahara, in marine areas, estuaries, bays, open shallow subtidal areas, coastal, marginal marine areas, deep waters, offshore, and fluvial-deltaic areas. P. lathami has 53 occurrences, with 1 being found in Egypt with a rostal tooth about 10 cm in length.

== Occurrences ==
Formations and locations where Pristis lathami has been found in include:

- Tupelo Bay Formation, South Carolina
- Jacksonian Formation, Georgia
- Claiborne Formation, Alabama
- Moodys Branch Formation, Mississippi
- Yazoo Clay, Louisiana
- Ameki Formation, Nigeria
- Maritime Region, Togo
- Ilaro Formation, Ameki Formation, Ivory Coast
- Samlat Formation, Western Sahara
- Dabaa Formation, Qasr el Sagha Formation, Birket Qarun Formation, Gehannam Formation, Egypt
- Chitarwata Formation, Pakistan
- Elmore Formation, United Kingdom
- Balegem, Belgium
