= Dizzya =

Dizzya Temporal range: Eocene

Scientific classification
- Kingdom: Animalia
- Phylum: Chordata
- Class: Mammalia
- Order: Chiroptera
- Family: †Philisidae
- Genus: †Dizzya; Sigé, 1991

Species
- D. exsultans Sigé, 1991 (type)

Extinct genus of bats

Dizzya is an extinct, monotypic genus of bat that occurred in the Chambi region, Tunisia, in the Middle Eocene. It was described based on a single upper molar, a lower dentary with two broken teeth, and a humerus. It is the smallest and, along with Witwatia sigei, the oldest representative of the Philisidae, an extinct family of bats related to the Vespertilionidae.
