= Qasr el Sagha Formation =

Geological formation in Egypt

Quasr el Sagha Formation
- Stratigraphic range: Priabonian; ~37–34 Ma
- Type: Geological formation
- Sub-units: Dir Abu Lifa & Temple Members
- Underlies: Gebel Qatrani Formation
- Overlies: Birket Qarun Formation

Lithology
- Primary: Sandstone
- Other: Mudstone

Location
- Location: Fayum District
- Coordinates: 29.5°N 30.5°E
- Approximate paleocoordinates: 24.9°N 26.5°E
- Country: Egypt
- Extent: Wadi El Hitan
- Qasr el Sagha Formation (Egypt)

The Qasr el Sagha Formation is a geological formation located in Egypt. The formation is part of the Wadi El Hitan World Heritage Site. The Qasr el Sagha Formation overlies the Birket Qarun Formation and is overlain by the Gebel Qatrani Formation. The sandstones and shales of the formation were deposited in a deltaic to shallow marine environment. It dates to the Late Eocene (middle Priabonian, 37.2 to 33.9 million years ago).

== Paleontological significance ==
Color key: Taxon / Reclassified taxon / Taxon falsely reported as present / Dubious taxon or junior synonym / Ichnotaxon / Ootaxon / Morphotaxon	Notes; Uncertain or tentative taxa are in small text; ~~crossed out~~ taxa are discredited.

Fossils of the early whale genus Saghacetus ("Sagha whale", originally named "Zeuglodon osiris") were first collected at Qasr al Sagha by German explorer Georg August Schweinfurth in January 1886 (a well-preserved dentary).Saghacetus is common in the middle of Qasr el Sagha, but there are few other specimens of archaeocetes whales; the only exception being the enigmatic "Prozeuglodon stromeri", named in 1828 based on specimens from 1904, but never adequately described before their destruction during the bombing of Munich in World War II.

Other fossils found in the formation include:

=== Mammals ===
==== Afrotheres ====
Afrotheres
Genus	Species	Presence	Stratigraphic member	Material	Notes	Images
Archaeosiren	A. stromeri	Westlich von Dimeh, Fayum.		A skull & isolated thoracic vertebrae.	Synonym of Eosiren libyca.	
Barytherium	B. cf. B. grave	Locality 25 & an unspecified locality.	Dir Abu Lifa Member.	2 teeth (DPC 2917 & 4071).	A basal proboscidean.	
Eosiren	E. libyca	North of Birket Qarun.	Temple Member.	Skulls & vertebrae.	A dugongid.	
Moeritherium	M. lyonsi	Various localities.	Dir Abu Lifa Member.	Numerous specimens.	A basal proboscidean.	
Pliohyracidae	Genus & species indeterminate	½ mile east of Qasr el Sagha Temple.	Dir Abu Lifa Member.	A mandible (AMNH 13445).	A large hyrax formerly thought to be a juvenile specimen of Moeritherium gracile.	
Protosiren	P. sp.			Mandible.	Actually from the Gehannam Formation or Birket Qarun Formation.	

==== Ferae ====
Ferae
Genus	Species	Presence	Stratigraphic member	Material	Notes	Images
Apterodon	A. saghensis	Locality 25.	Dir Abu Lifa Member.	Left mandibular fragment.	A hyaenodont.	
Apterodon	A. sp.	Three localities.	Dir Abu Lifa & Temple member.	Mandibular elements & 2 humeri.	A hyaenodont.	
cf. Hyaenodon	cf. H. brachycephalus	"Near Qasr el Sagha".		An eroded left mandibular corpus (AMNH 128553).	A hyaenodont.	

==== Ungulates ====
Ungulates
Genus	Species	Presence	Stratigraphic member	Material	Notes	Images
cf. Bothriogenys	cf. B. sp.	Locality 25.	Dir Abu Lifa Member.	A weathered right distal humerus & shaft.	An anthracothere.	
Dorudon	D. atrox	"Feinktirnigem graugriinlichem Sandstein der Saghastufe, Fayum".		Remains of an immature individual now destroyed.	A basilosaurid whale.	
Prozeuglodon	P. stromeri	"Feinktirnigem graugriinlichem Sandstein der Saghastufe, Fayum".		Remains of an immature individual now destroyed.	Junior synonym of Dorudon atrox.	
Saghacetus	S. osiris	Multiple localities.	Temple Member.	Multiple specimens.	A basilosaurid whale.	
Stromerius	S. nidensis	Blanckenhorn's interval II 5a of the Saghastufe.	Temple Member.	2 vertebral sequences (UM 100140 & BSPM 1902.XI.504-510).	A basilosaurid whale.	
Zeuglodon	Z. elliotsmithii	North of Birket Qarun.		An endocast.	Junior synonym of Saghacetus osiris.	
Zeuglodon	Z. sensitivus	Gar-el-Gehannem.	Temple Member.	An endocast.	Junior synonym of Saghacetus osiris.	
Zeuglodon	Z. zitteli	"Zeuglodonberg".		A fragmentary rostrum & 3 articulated cervical vertebrae.	Junior synonym of Saghacetus osiris.	

=== Reptiles ===
==== Squamates ====
Squmates
Genus	Species	Presence	Stratigraphic member	Material	Notes	Images
Gigantophis	G. garstini	"An unspecified locality north of Birket Qarun, Fayum".		Vertebrae & ribs.	A madtsoiid snake.	

==== Testudines ====
Testudines
Genus	Species	Presence	Stratigraphic member	Material	Notes	Images
Andrewsemys	A. libyca			An almost complete & well-preserved shell.	A podocnemidid.	
Cordichelys	C. sp.	North of Birket Qarun.		A nearly complete cranium lacking only the premaxillae (UMMP 13994).	A podocnemidid.	
Stereogenys	'S.' libyca			An almost complete & well-preserved shell.	Reassigned to Andrewsemys.	
Stereogenys	S.(?) sp.	North of Birket Qarun.		A mostly-complete carapace & plastron (CGM 8718).	A podocnemidid.	

=== Fish ===
  - Misrichthys stromeri
  - Carcharhinus aff. frequens
  - Odontorhytis aff. pappenheimi
  - ?Jacquhermania attiai
  - Carcharhinus sp.
  - Coupatezia sp.
  - Ouledia sp.
  - Pastinachus sp.
  - Rhinobatos sp.
  - Scyliorhinus sp.
  - ?Sphyrna sp.
  - Pristidae indet.
  - "Cretolamna" twiggsensis

== See also ==
- List of fossil sites
