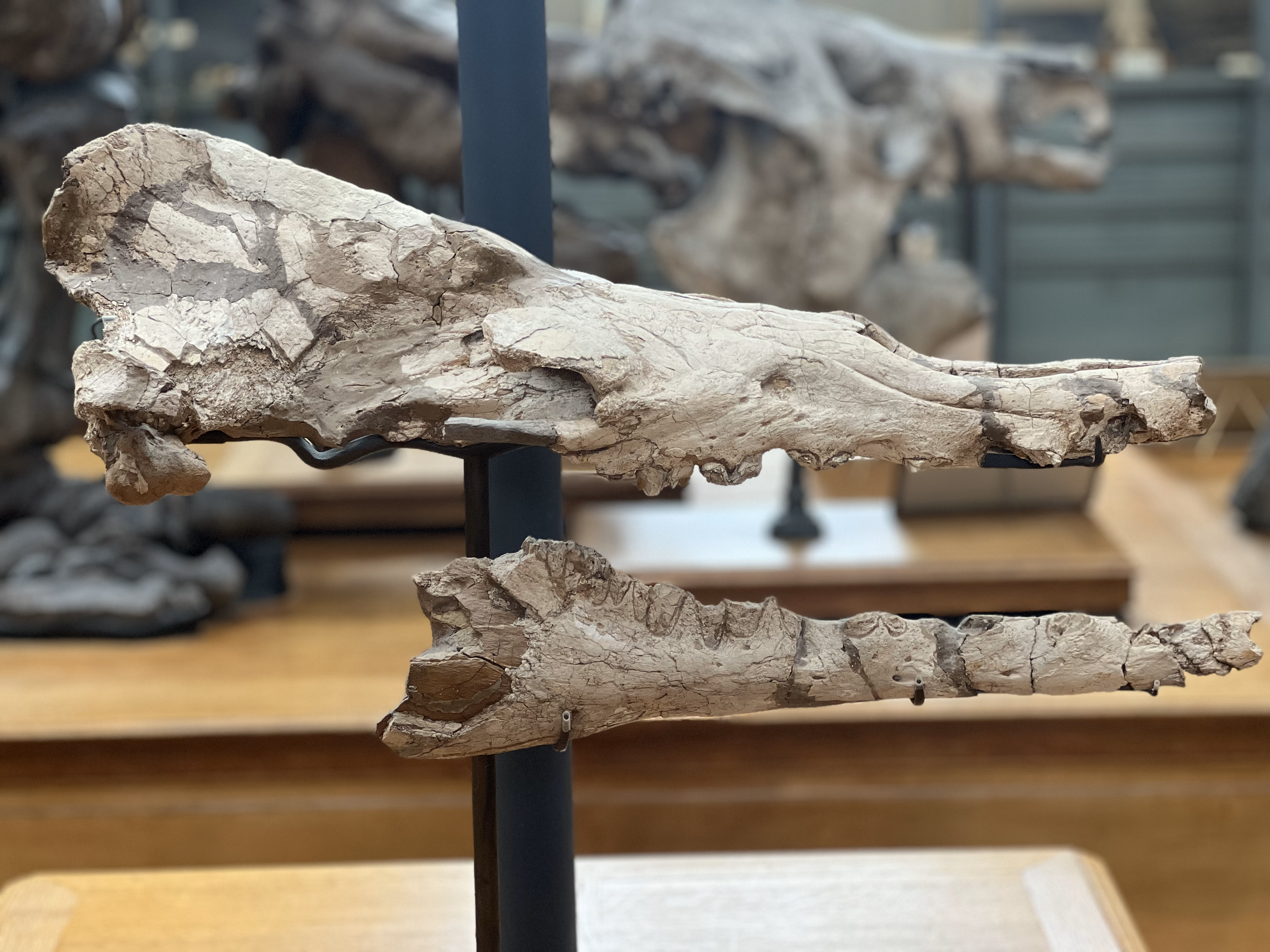
- Skull of Saghacetus osiris at the Muséum national d'Histoire naturelle, Paris
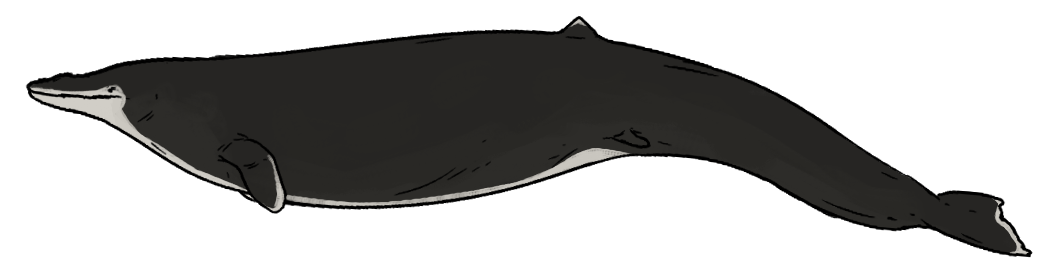
- Life restoration

Scientific classification
- Domain: Eukaryota
- Kingdom: Animalia
- Phylum: Chordata
- Class: Mammalia
- Order: Artiodactyla
- Suborder: Whippomorpha
- Infraorder: Cetacea
- Family: †Basilosauridae
- Subfamily: †Dorudontinae
- Genus: †Saghacetus; Gingerich, 1992

Type species
- †Zeuglodon osiris Dames, 1894

Synonyms
- Zeuglodon zitteli Stromer, 1903; Zeuglodon elliotsmithii Dart, 1923; Zeuglodon sensitivus Dart, 1923

= Saghacetus =

Saghacetus Temporal range: 37.2–33.9 Ma

Genus of mammals

Saghacetus is an extinct genus of basilosaurid early whale, fossils of which have been found in the Upper Eocene (middle Priabonian, 37.2 to 33.9 million years ago) Qasr el Sagha Formation, Egypt (29.7°N 30.8°E, paleocoordinates 25.0°N 26.7°E).

== Discovery ==
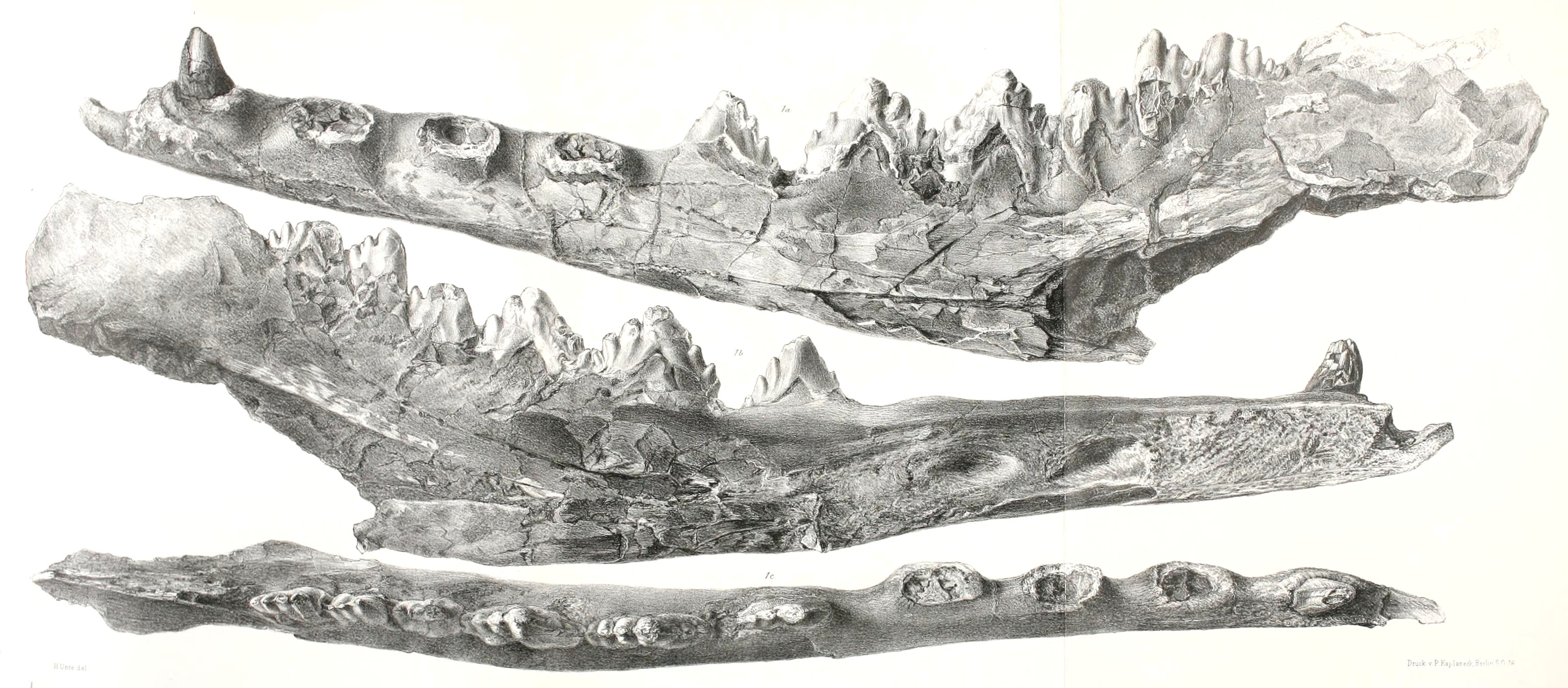
Mandible from Dames 1894, the type specimen

In 1879, German botanist Georg August Schweinfurth spent many years exploring Africa and eventually discovered the first archaeocete whale in Egypt. He visited Qasr el Sagha in 1884 and 1886 and missed the now famous "Zeuglodon Valley" with a few kilometres. German palaeontologist Wilhelm Barnim Dames described the material, including a well-preserved dentary which is the type specimen of Zeuglodon osiris.

The generic name Saghacetus was established by Gingerich 1992 to group the ancient species Dorudon osiris, D. zitteli, D. sensitivius and D. elliotsmithii on a single species, Saghacetus osiris. This species is distinguished from other members of the subfamily Dorudontinae by its smaller size and the slightly elongated proximal lumbar and caudal vertebrae.

== Description ==
Saghacetus was a small whale, reaching 4 m (13 ft) in length and 350–379 kg (772–836 lb) in body mass. It was smaller than its contemporary Stromerius, both of which are smaller than the older Dorudon.
