= Wadi al Hitan =

Paleontological site in the Faiyum Governorate of Egypt

UNESCO World Heritage Site
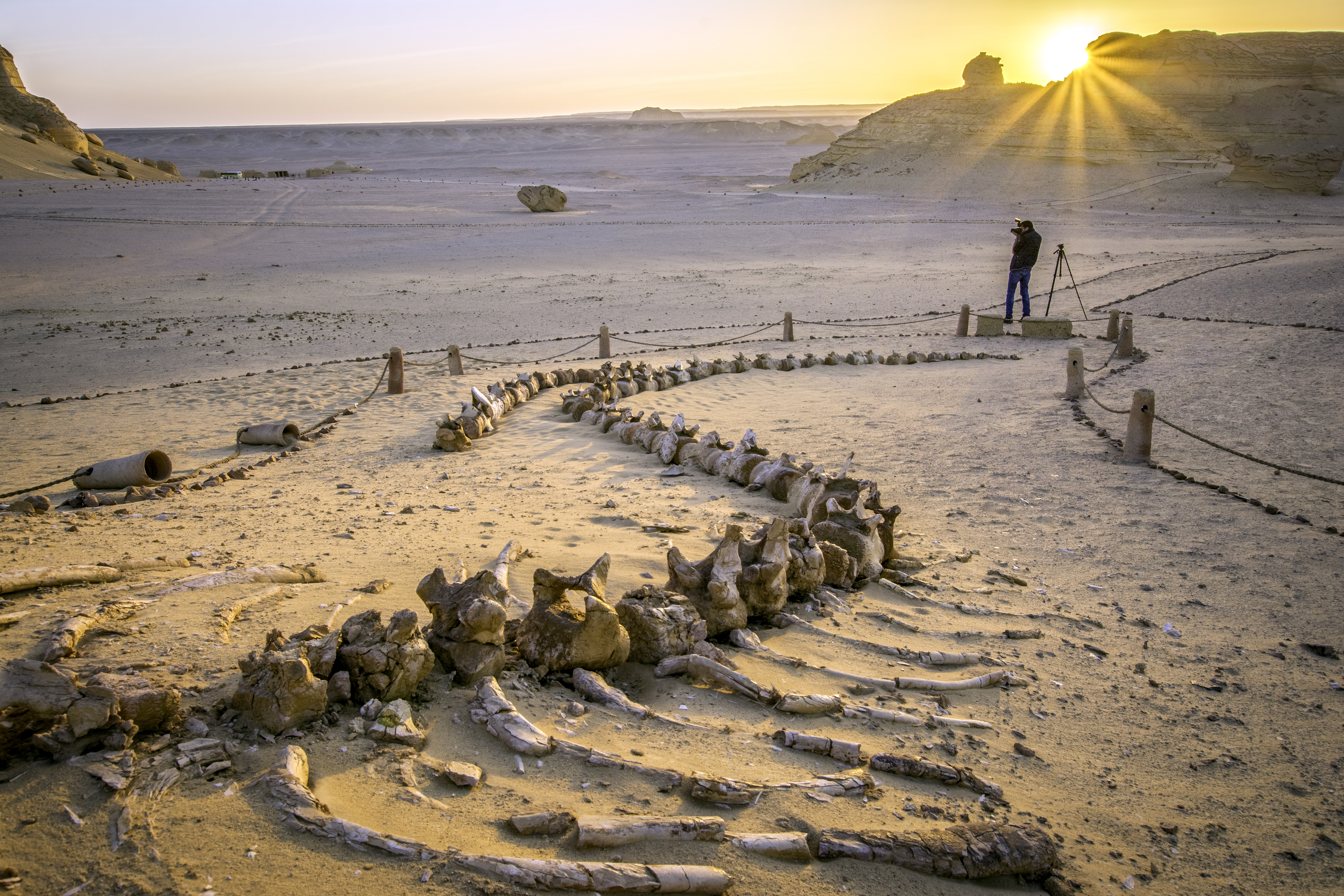
- Basilosaurid whale skeleton in Wādī al-Ḥītān

- Location within Egypt
- Location: Faiyum Governorate, Egypt
- Reference: 1186
- Inscription: 2005 (29th Session)
- Area: 200.15 km^{2} (49,458 acres)
- Buffer zone: 58.85 km^{2} (14,542 acres)
- Coordinates: 29°20′N 30°11′E

Wādī al-Ḥītān (Arabic: وادي الحيتان, lit. 'Wadi of the Whales' Egyptian Arabic pronunciation: [ˈwa.diː elˈħit.æːn]) is a paleontological site in the Faiyum Governorate of Egypt, some 150 kilometres (93 mi) south-west of Cairo. It was designated a UNESCO World Heritage Site in July 2005 for its hundreds of fossils of some of the earliest forms of whale, the archaeoceti (a now extinct sub-order of whales). The site reveals evidence for the explanation of one of the greatest mysteries of the evolution of whales: the emergence of the whale as an ocean-going mammal from a previous life as a land-based animal.

No other place in the world yields the number, concentration and quality of such fossils, nor their accessibility and setting in an attractive and protected landscape. The valley was therefore inscribed on the UNESCO World Heritage List in 2005.

== History ==
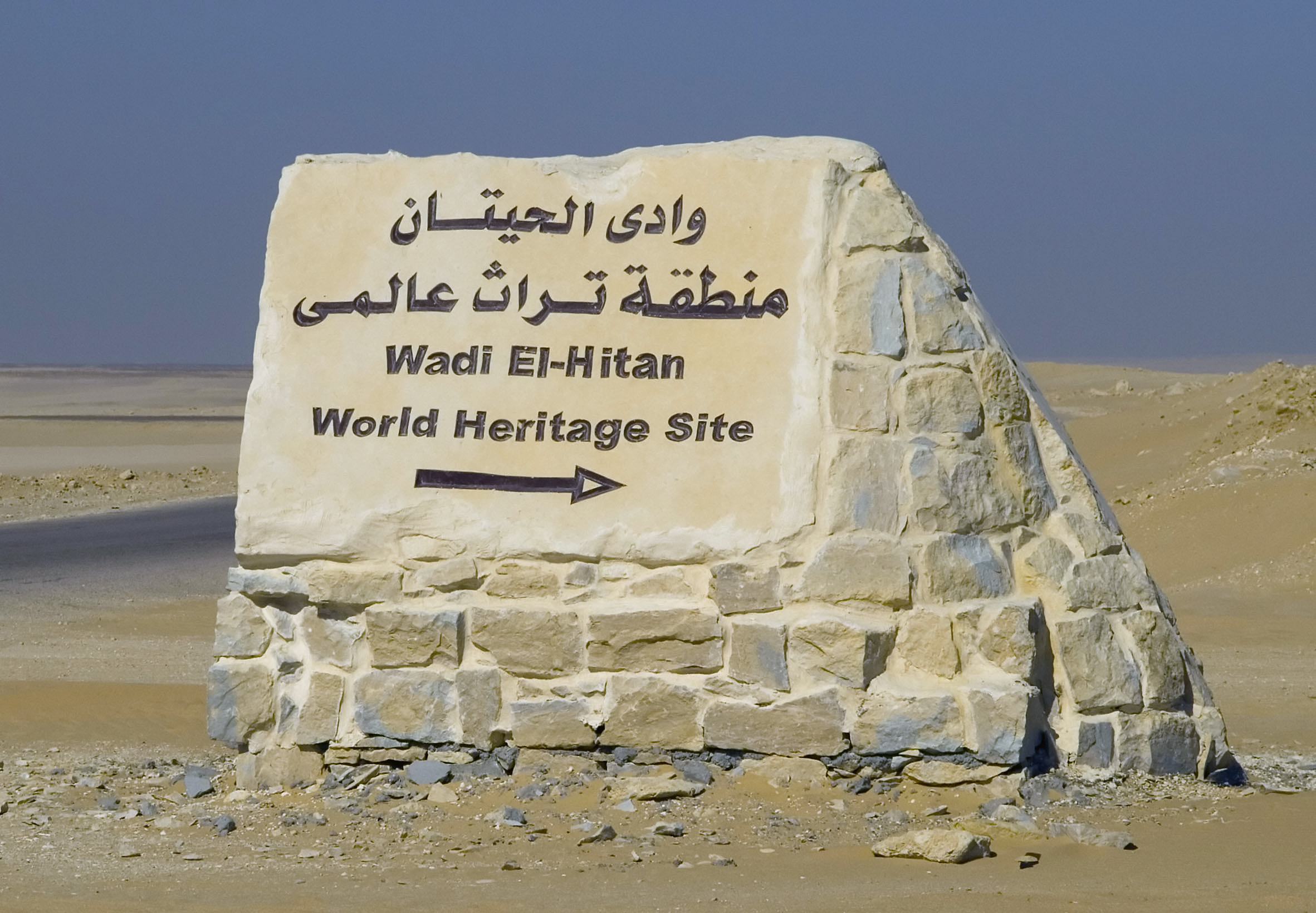
Entrance sign to the site

The fossils found at the site may not be the oldest but their great concentration in the area and the degree of their preservation is such that even some stomach contents are intact. The presence of fossils of other early animals such as sharks, crocodiles, sawfish, turtles and rays found at Wādī al-Ḥītān makes it possible to reconstruct the surrounding environmental and ecological conditions of the time, adding to its justification to be cited as a Heritage site.

The first fossil skeletons of whales were discovered in the winter of 1902–03. For the next 80 years, they attracted relatively little interest, largely due to difficulty in reaching the area. In the 1980s, interest in the site resumed as four wheel drive vehicles became more readily available. Continuing interest coincided with the site being visited by fossil collectors, and many bones were removed, prompting calls for the site to be conserved.

The remains display the typical streamlined body form of modern whales, yet retain some of the primitive aspects of skull and tooth structure. The largest skeleton found reached up to 21 m in length, with well-developed five-fingered flippers on the forelimbs and the unexpected presence of hind legs, feet, and toes, not known previously in any archaeoceti. Their form was serpentine and they were carnivorous. A few of these skeletal remains are exposed but most are shallowly buried in sediments, slowly uncovered by erosion. Wādī al-Ḥītān provides evidence of millions of years of coastal marine life.

== Fossils ==
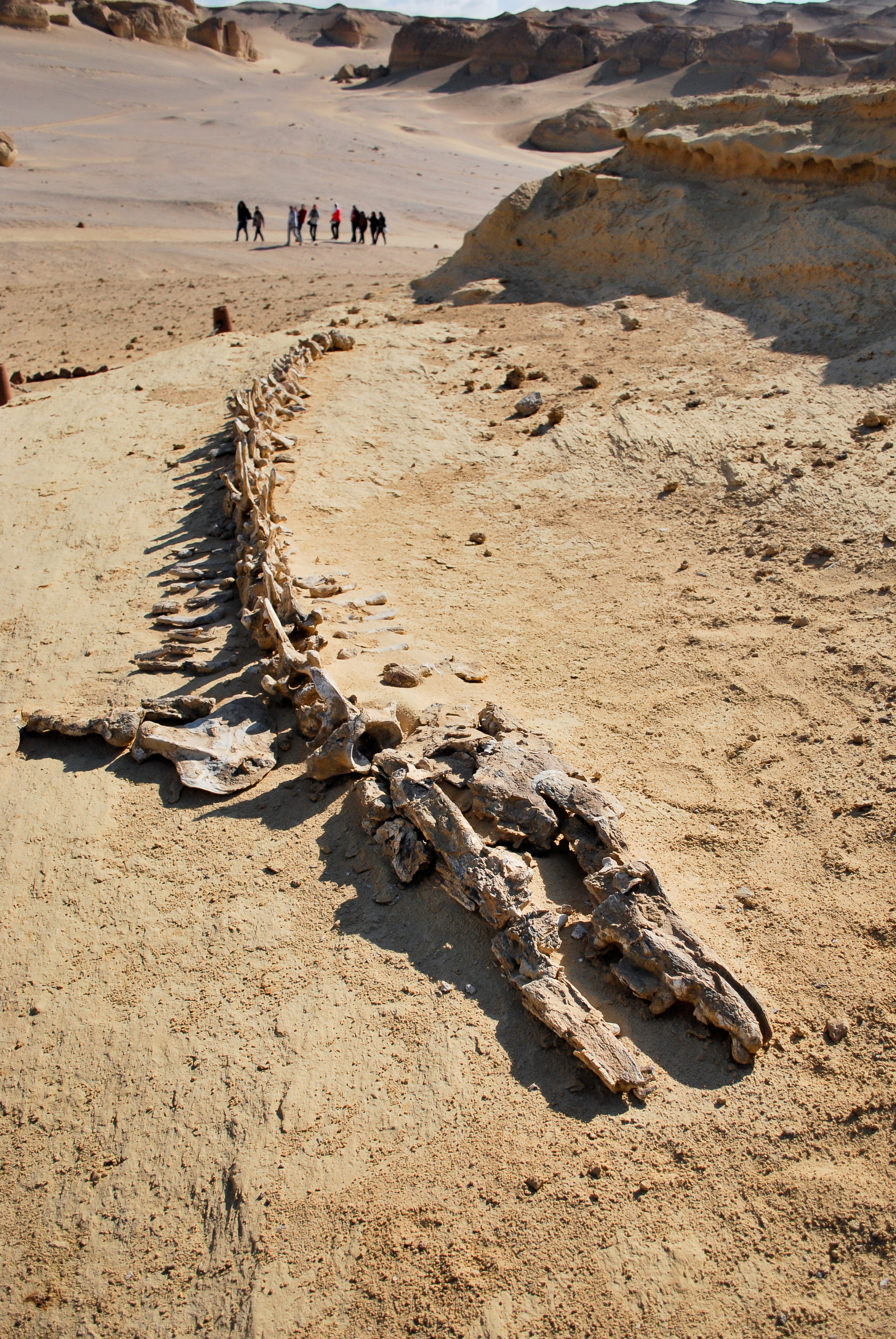
Skeletons of basilosaurid whales like Dorudon (featured above) were discovered at the site

Wādī al-Ḥītān is the most important site in the world to demonstrate one of the iconic changes that make up the record of life on Earth: the evolution of the whales. It portrays vividly their form and mode of life during their transition from land animals to a marine existence. It exceeds the values of other comparable sites in terms of the number, concentration and quality of its fossils, and their accessibility and setting in an attractive and protected landscape. Iconic assemblage of fossilized skeletons of Archaeoceti (primitive whales documenting cetacean transition to marine life), sirenians and reptiles, as well as shark teeth from Gehannam Formation (40–41 million years ago). The strata in Wādī al-Ḥītān belongs to Middle Eocene epoch and it contains extensive vertebrate fossils within a 200 km^{2} (77 sq mi) area. Fossils are present in high numbers and often show excellent quality of preservation. The most conspicuous fossils are the skeletons and bones of whales and sea cows, and over several hundred fossils of these have been documented. Wādī al-Ḥītān (Whale Valley) is unusual in having such a large concentration of fossil whales (1500 marine vertebrate fossil skeletons) in a relatively small area.

The fossils of whales vary from single bones to entire skeletons, and a number of partial skeletons are currently on display in the public part of the park. The two common whales are the large Basilosaurus, and the smaller (3- to 5-metre) Dorudon. At least two other species are known from rarer remains. The whales possess small hind limbs that are not seen in modern whales, and a powerful skull with teeth similar to those of carnivorous land mammals. Other mammals are represented by the skeletons of three species of sirenia or sea cows. These were fully marine like the whales, and likewise show primitive features not seen in modern species and possess teeth that suggest that they grazed on seagrasses and other marine plants. Bones of the primitive elephant Moeritherium have also been recorded.

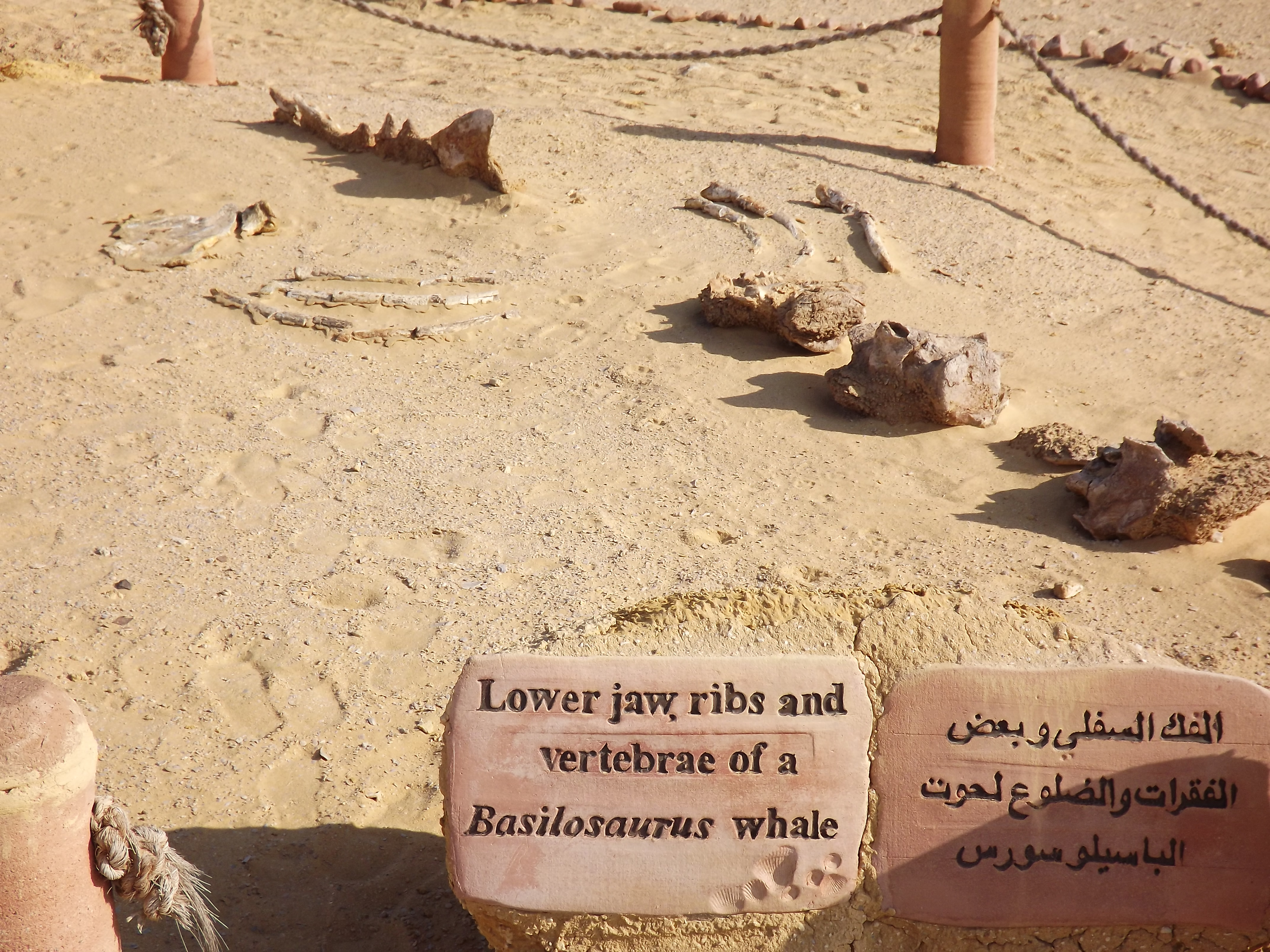
Partial skeleton of Basilosaurus at Wādī al-Ḥītān

Fossil reptiles are represented by fossils of crocodiles and sea turtles, and bones of sea snakes have also been recorded. There are many species of bony fish, sharks and rays represented, but most of the fossils are isolated small teeth and these are not often conspicuous. Larger fish fossils include the rostra and pegs of sawfish; a sawfish rostrum of 1.8 metres long is laid out in the park. Fossil shells are not common in the main whale-bearing rocks, but are very common in other rocks; many fallen rocks can be seen to be full of a wide variety of fossil shells. Disc-shaped nummulite fossils are common in places, and often coat the desert floor. A large log is present in the park, and this is full of tubular shipworm fossils. Some fossil seagrasses are also known.

The oldest fossil yet discovered of a pelican (dating from the late Eocene) was identified at Wādī al-Ḥītān in 2021.

== Geology ==
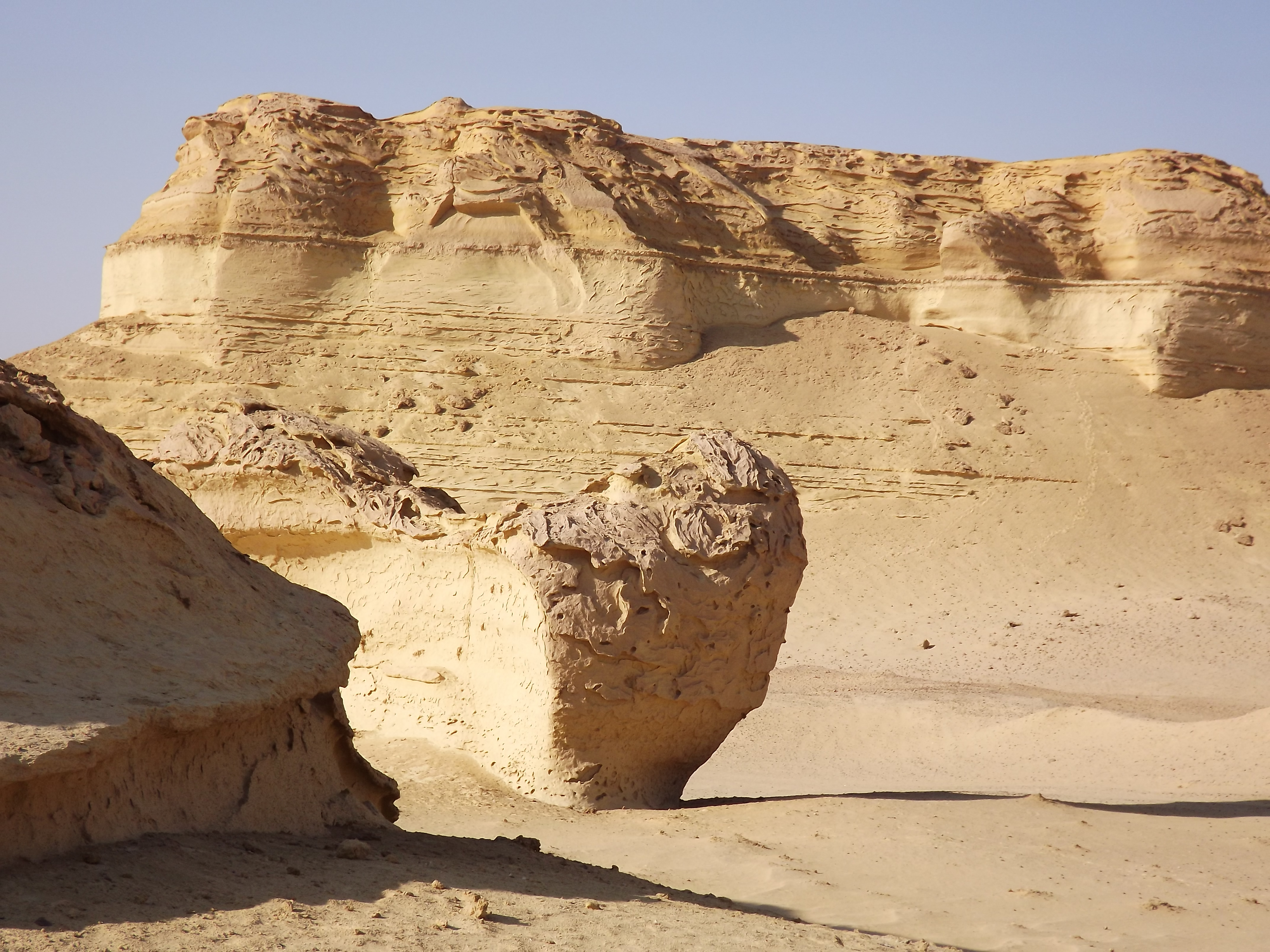
Eroded stratified sandstone bodies from Wādī al-Ḥītān

The geology of the valley gives rise to the scenery, with wind and water erosion producing spectacular cliffs and buttes. The rocks present at Wādī al-Ḥītān are all Middle to Late Eocene in age and is composed of three main rock units. The Gehannam Formation comprises open marine mudstones, which are largely present on the flatter ground to the east of the public park. The rock unit that contains most of the whale fossils is the Birket Qarun Formation. This comprises yellowish open marine sandstones that form most of the cliffs and buttes.

The monotony of these sandstones is broken by a white layer full of well-preserved animal burrows (previously thought to be mangrove roots) and a layer of black mudstone above that. When the cliffs of the Birket Qarun Formation are followed to the East, they are replaced by Gehannam Formation mudstones, indicating a change in water depth from shallower to deeper in that direction. The tops of the higher cliffs are within the Qasr el Sagha Formation, which comprises dark mudstones alternating with limestones full of shells and represents a lagoonal environment.

== Wildlife ==
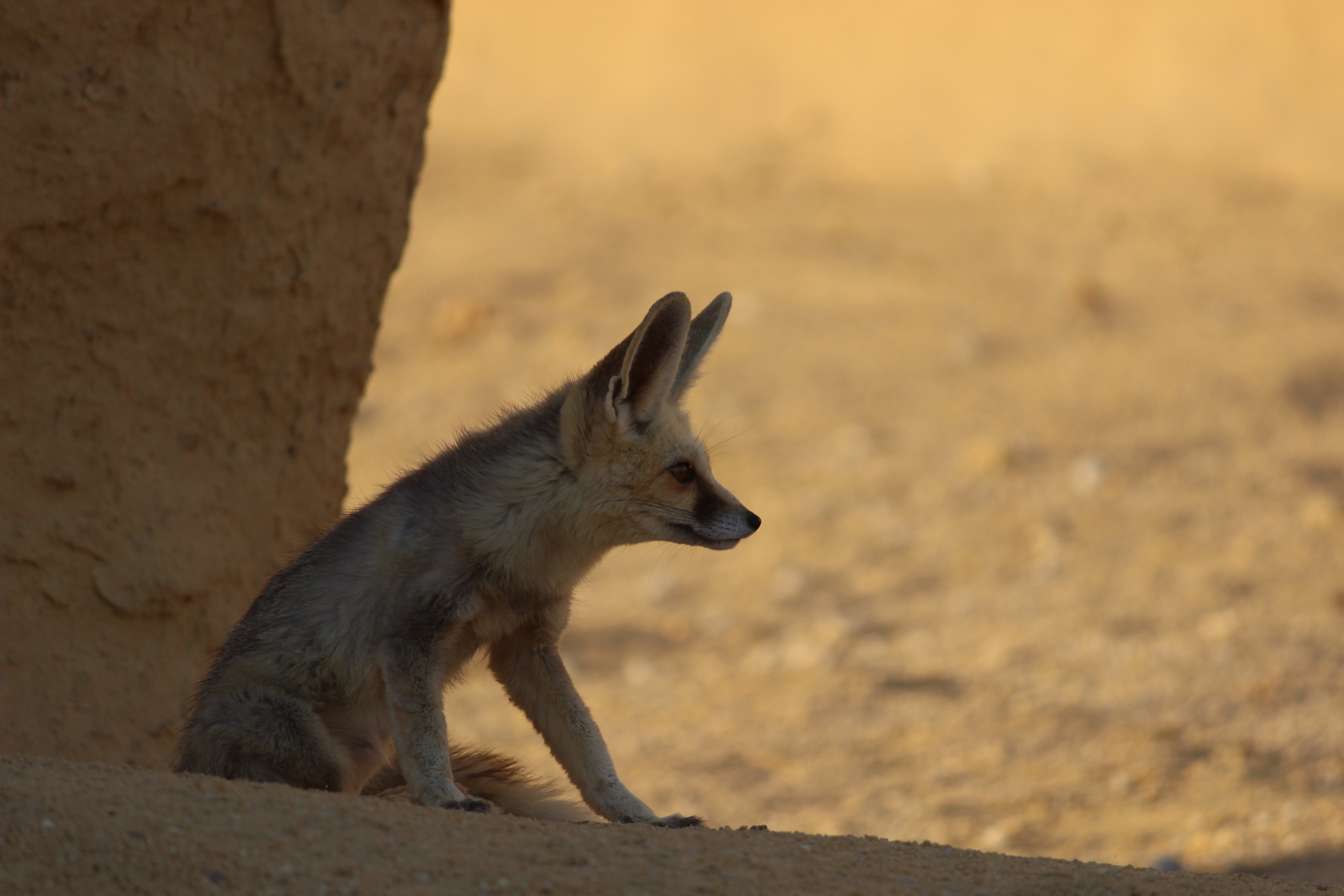
A fennec fox from Wādī al-Ḥītān

Wādī al-Ḥītān is also home to 15 species of desert plants, sand dunes, and about 15 types of wild mammals including the Egyptian wolf, red fox, African leopard, Egyptian mongoose, African wildcat, Cape hare, caracal, striped hyena, and dorcas gazelle. Fennec foxes are the most commonly seen mammal and regularly visit the camp site at night. Also, attracted by the lakes at Wadi El Rayan are 19 species of reptiles and 36 species of breeding birds.

== Tourism ==
Only about 1,000 visitors a year drive into Wādī al-Ḥītān by 4WD because the track is unpaved and crosses unmarked desert sands. For the most part, visitors to Wādī al-Ḥītān are foreigners, who usually camp in the valley on winter weekends. Because Wādī al-Ḥītān is within the Wadi El Rayan Protected Area, the same protection management plan restricts visitors to prearranged guided tours along a prescribed trail. Sustainable tourism is beginning to develop and grow in the area, and the 4WD are alternatively being replaced by foot or camel treks.

Since part of Wādī al-Ḥītān was made into a tourist venue, walkways between the main fossils have been laid out and small shelters built. This public park is now regularly visited by tourist groups, and a small camp site is present.

The valley is located behind a mountain known as Garet Gohannam "the Mountain of Hell". In the light of the setting sun, the mountain seems ablaze with an eerie red light.

The Egyptian government said that in July 2007 a pair of cars driven by Belgian diplomats entered a protected zone in this area and destroyed part of the whale fossil, causing 10 million US dollars' worth of damage. The Belgian government alleges no damage was caused by its diplomats. The issue remains unresolved.

== Gallery ==
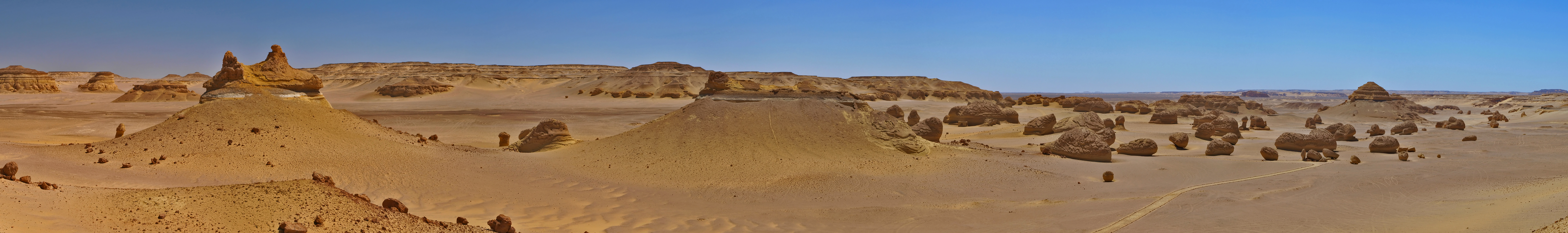
Panoramic view of the Wādī al-Ḥītān locality
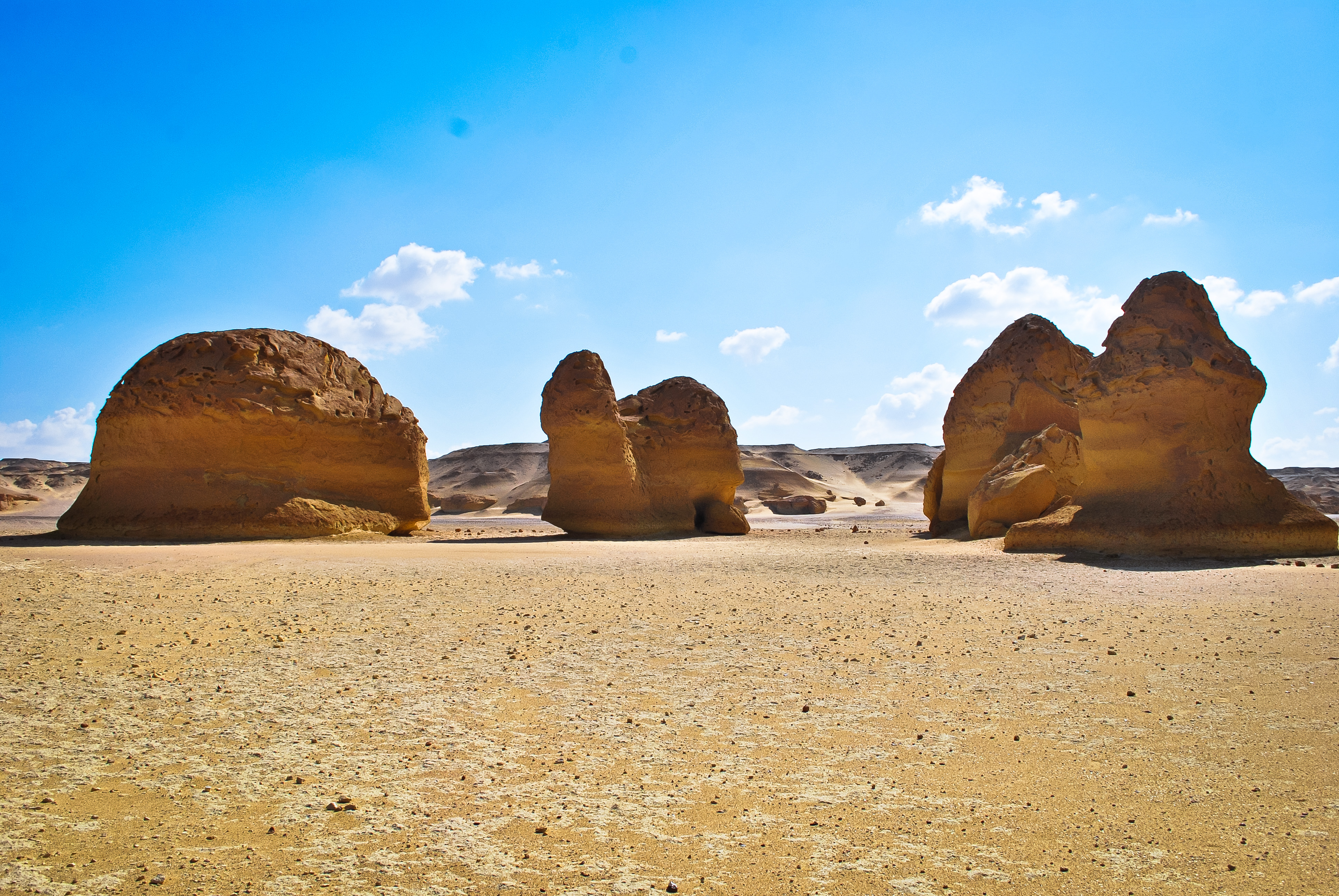

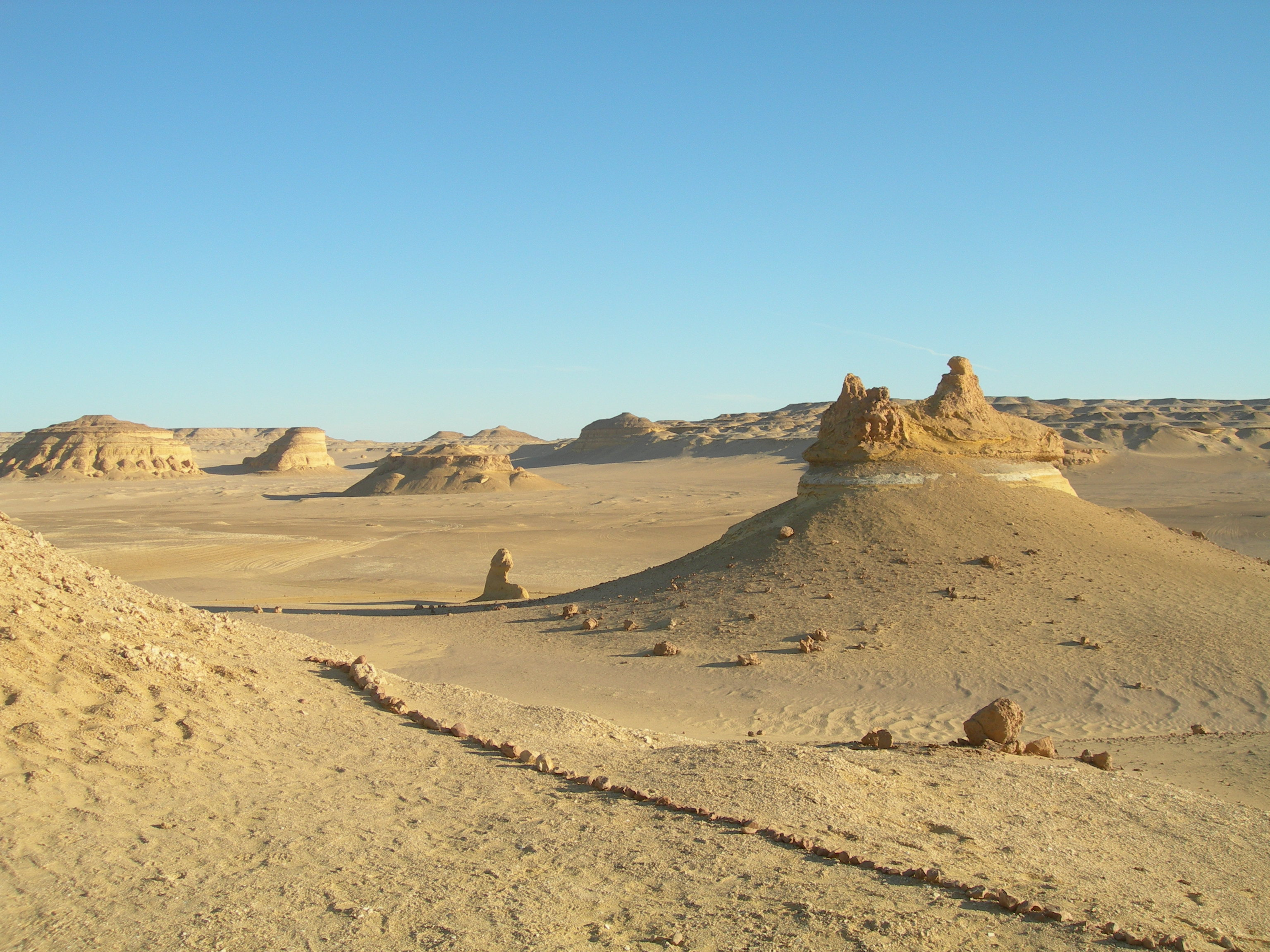

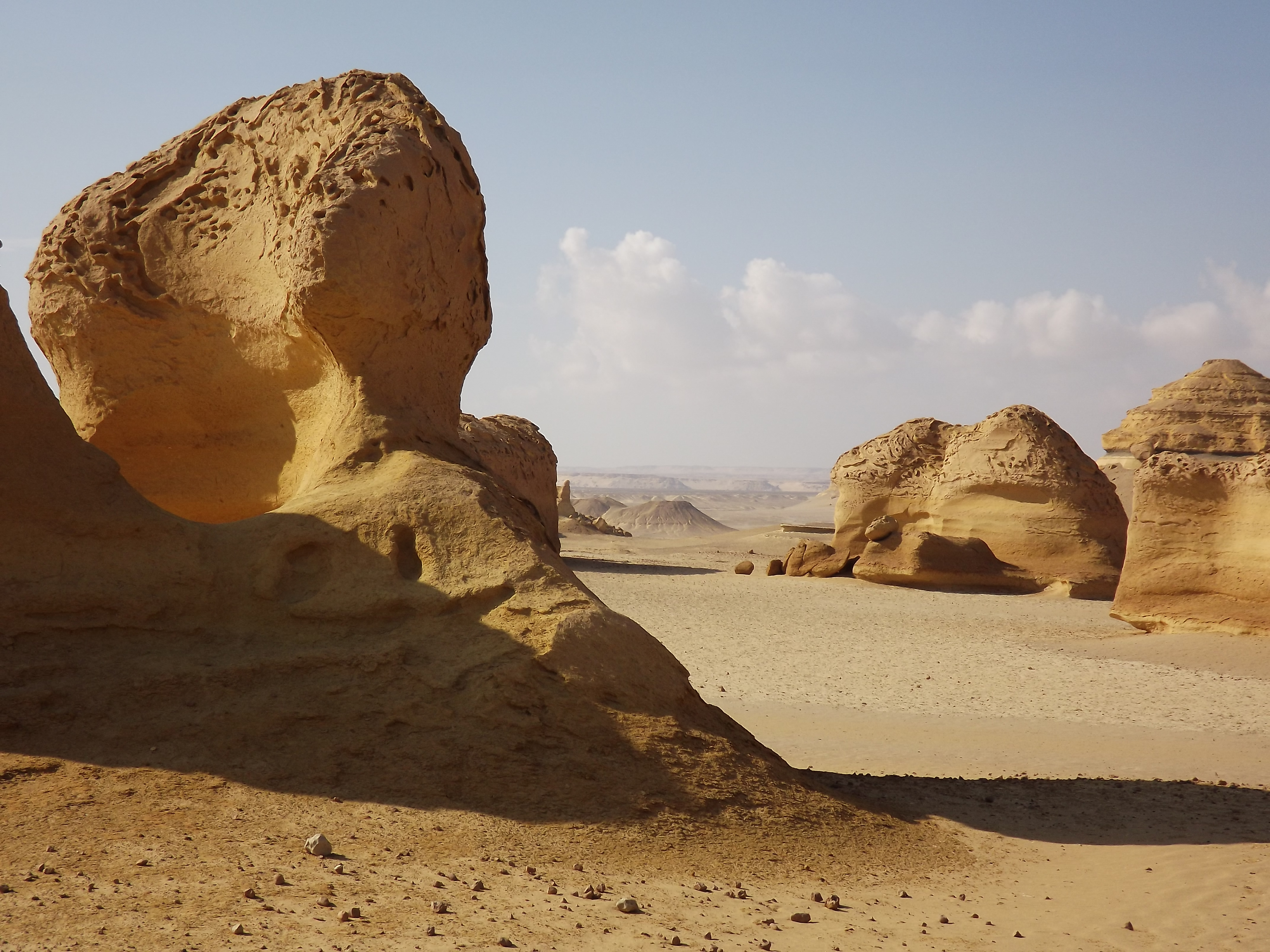

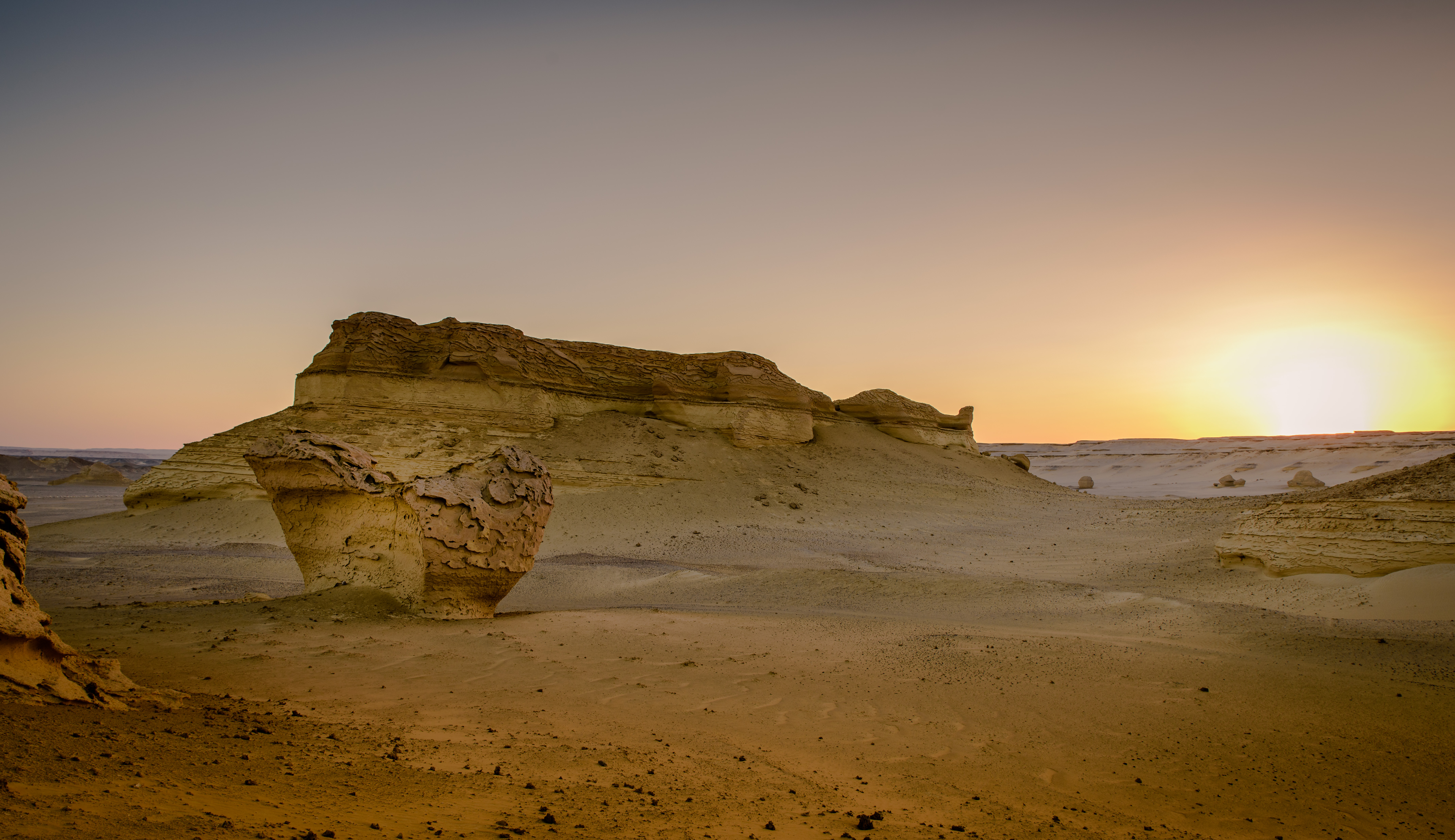

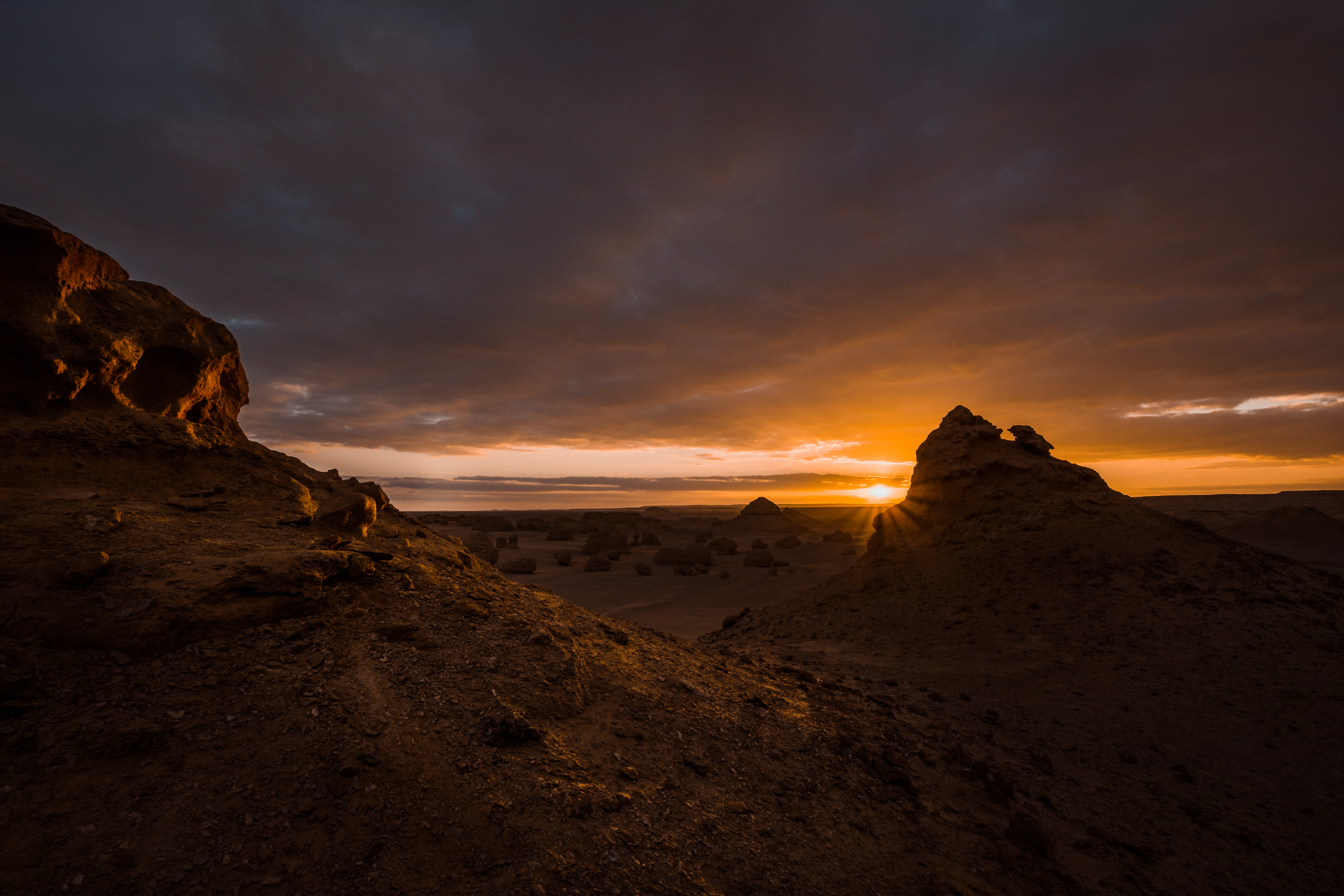
