= Gehannam Formation =

Geological formation in Egypt

- Stratigraphic range: Eocene; ~47.8–33.9 Ma
- Type: Sedimentary

Lithology
- Primary: Sandstone, claystone, shale, limestone claystone

Location
- Region: Faiyum Governorate
- Country: Egypt

The Gehannam Formation (or Gar Gehannam) is a formation in Egypt which dates to the Eocene. It is similar in age to the Birket Qarun Formation.

== Paleobiota ==
=== Mammals ===
==== Afrotheres ====
Afrotheres
| Genus | Species | Member | Locality | Material | Notes | Images |
|---|---|---|---|---|---|---|
| Protosiren | P. smithae | | | | | |

==== Cetacea ====
Cetacea
| Genus | Species | Member | Locality | Material | Notes | Images |
|---|---|---|---|---|---|---|
| Basilosaurus | B. isis | | | | | |
| Dorudon | D. atrox | | | | | |
| Aegicetus | A. gehennae | | | | | |
| Masracetus | M. markgrafi | | | | | |
| Protocetidae | indeterminate | | | | | |

=== Reptiles ===
==== Crocodylomorphs ====
Crocodylomorphs
| Genus | Species | Member | Locality | Material | Notes | Images |
|---|---|---|---|---|---|---|
| Paratomistoma | P. courtii | | | | | |

=== Fish ===
==== Actinopterygians ====
Actinopterygians
| Genus | Species | Member | Locality | Material | Notes | Images |
|---|---|---|---|---|---|---|
| "Pycnodus" | "P". mokattamensis | | | | | |

==== Chondrichthyes ====
Selachimorpha
| Genus | Species | Member | Locality | Material | Notes | Images |
|---|---|---|---|---|---|---|
| Rhizoprionodon | R. sp. | | | | | |
| Macrorhizodus | M. praecursor | | | | | |
| Negaprion | N. frequens, N. amekiensis | | | | | |
| Nebrius | N. sp. | | | | | |
| Alopias | A. sp. | | | | | |
| Hemipristis | H. sp. | | | | | |
| Triakidae | | | | | | |
| Otodus | O. sokolovi | | | | | |
| Hexanchus | H. sp. | | | | | |
| Squatina | S. sp. | | | | | |
| Leptocharias | L. sp. | | | | | |
| Carcharias | C. sp. | | | | | |
| Physogaleus | P. sp. | | | | | |
| Abdounia | A. sp. | | | | | |
| Crassescyliorhinus | C. sp. | | | | | |
| Galeocerdo | G. sp. | | | | | |
| Brachycarcharias | B. cf. twiggsensis | | | | | |
