= Philisidae =

Philisidae Temporal range: Eocene–Miocene

Scientific classification
- Kingdom: Animalia
- Phylum: Chordata
- Class: Mammalia
- Order: Chiroptera
- Superfamily: Vespertilionoidea
- Family: †Philisidae; Sigé, 1985

Genera
- See the text

Extinct family of bats

Philisidae is an extinct family of bats of the suborder Microchiroptera that lived between the Eocene to the Late Miocene in the continent of Africa.

== Genera ==
Currently the following genera are known:

- †Dizzya Sigé, 1991
- †Philisis Sigé, 1985 (type genus)
- †Scotophilisis Horáček, Fejfar & Hulva, 2006
- †Vampyravus Schlosser, 1910
- †Witwatia Gunnell et al., 2008
