= Aegyptonycteris =

Aegyptonycteris Temporal range: Priabonian ~37 Ma

Scientific classification
- Kingdom: Animalia
- Phylum: Chordata
- Class: Mammalia
- Order: Chiroptera
- Family: †Aegyptonycteridae; Simmons, N., Seiffert, E., Gunnell, G. 2016
- Genus: †Aegyptonycteris; Simmons, N., Seiffert, E., Gunnell, G. 2016
- Species: †A. knightae

Binomial name
- †Aegyptonycteris knightae Simmons, N., Seiffert, E., Gunnell, G. 2016

Extinct genus of bats

Aegyptonycteris ("Egyptian bat") is a genus of extinct bat from the Late Eocene of North Africa. It is currently known from a single specimen (holotype CGM 83740) from the Birket Qarun Formation in the Fayum Depression in western Egypt.

Aegyptonycteris is notable both its large size, comparable to the larger modern bat species, as well due to its omnivorous diet, as opposed to the mostly insectivorous diets of other Eocene bats (and the majority of modern species). This makes it a remarkable example of early chiropteran speciation, having not only attained a rather large size but also specialised towards a drastically different ecological niche from its contemporaries.

== Description ==
Aegyptonycteris is currently known only from its holotype. Said specimen is composed of a right maxilla - including the posterior portion of the orbital door and base of the zygomatic arch - and two molar teeth. The anterior orbital door is broad and flat and the zygomatic arch is robust and well developed, characteristics seen in a variety of mammal groups including the contemporary primates, eulipotyphlans and metatherians, but the molars have classical chiropteran traits like dilambdodonty, lack of a mesostyle and a narrow protofossa, though it does differ from most other bats in the presence of a bulbous hypocone.

Comparisons to other bat species show that the animal was probably similar in size to the modern Vampyrum spectrum, if not larger.

Currently, it is unknown whether it had echolocation, though its omnivorous habits might imply the use of other senses like smell, as in modern frugivorous and omnivorous bat species.

== Classification ==
Aegyptonycteris is recovered as a chiropteran on the basis of several dental characteristics (see above). It is considered rather aberrant, however, and is considered to be a fairly basal species.

== Ecology ==
Based on its tooth morphology, Aegyptonycteris was most likely a generalistic omnivore. Unlike other contemporary bats such as Witwatia, it lacks speciations towards carnivory, as well as speciations in other extreme lifestyles displayed by modern bats, such as frugivory or nectarivory. Instead, its molars are fairly generalised, with a few speciations towards crushing, suggesting a diet involving both animal and plant matter.

In this, it is unique in being the earliest truly omnivorous bat ever known, and the largest omnivorous bat species (other similar sized species are either specialised carnivores, including the contemporary giant bat Witwatia, or frugivores).

== Paleoecology ==
The Fayum Depression is one of the richest Eocene fossil sites, depicting a wet tropical environment dominated by lagoons, dating around the Priabonian. It is best renowned for its early whales like Basilosaurus, but several other mammal groups, from primates to early elephants and several extinct groups like embrithopods and hyaenodontids are also known.

Several bat species are known from this locality, including the similarly large Witwatia species, which are directly contemporary to Aegyptonycteris, suggesting that this environment supported several large sized chiropteran species. In particular, Aegyptonycteris is not directly related to these other giant bats, suggesting that it evolved gigantism independently.
