= Saharagalago =

Saharagalago Temporal range: Bartonian

Scientific classification
- Kingdom: Animalia
- Phylum: Chordata
- Class: Mammalia
- Order: Primates
- Suborder: Strepsirrhini
- Family: Galagidae
- Genus: †Saharagalago
- Species: †S. misrensis

Binomial name
- †Saharagalago misrensis Seiffert et al., 2003

Extinct genus of galagid primate

Saharagalago is an extinct monotypic genus of strepsirrhine primate that lived in Afro-Arabia during the Bartonian stage of the Eocene epoch.

== Etymology ==
The generic name Saharagalago references the Sahara Desert and the status of the genus as a member of the galagid family. The specific epithet of the type species Saharagalago misrensis derives from Misr, the Arabic name for Egypt, where the holotype fossil was found.
