= Renenutet (snake) =

Renenutet Temporal range: Priabonian

Scientific classification
- Kingdom: Animalia
- Phylum: Chordata
- Class: Reptilia
- Order: Squamata
- Suborder: Serpentes
- Family: †Thaumastophiidae
- Genus: †Renenutet; McCartney and Seiffert, 2015

Type species
- Renenutet enmerwer McCartney and Seiffert, 2015

Extinct genus of snakes

Renenutet is an extinct genus of colubroid snake that lived in Egypt during the Priabonian.
