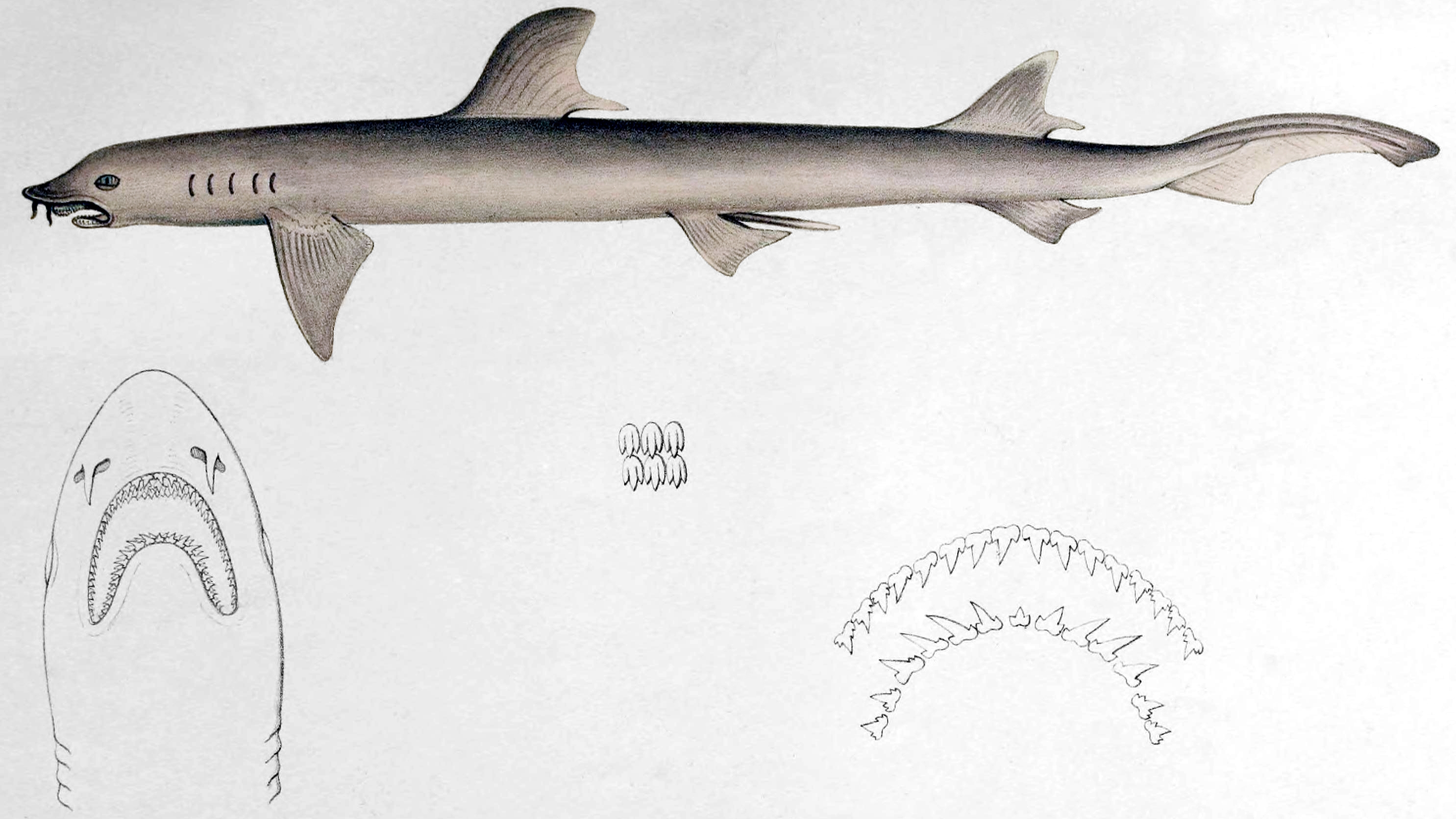

Conservation status
- Vulnerable (IUCN 3.1)

Scientific classification
- Kingdom: Animalia
- Phylum: Chordata
- Class: Chondrichthyes
- Subclass: Elasmobranchii
- Division: Selachii
- Order: Carcharhiniformes
- Family: Leptochariidae; J. E. Gray, 1851
- Genus: Leptocharias; A. Smith, 1838
- Species: L. smithii

Binomial name
- Leptocharias smithii (J. P. Müller & Henle, 1839)
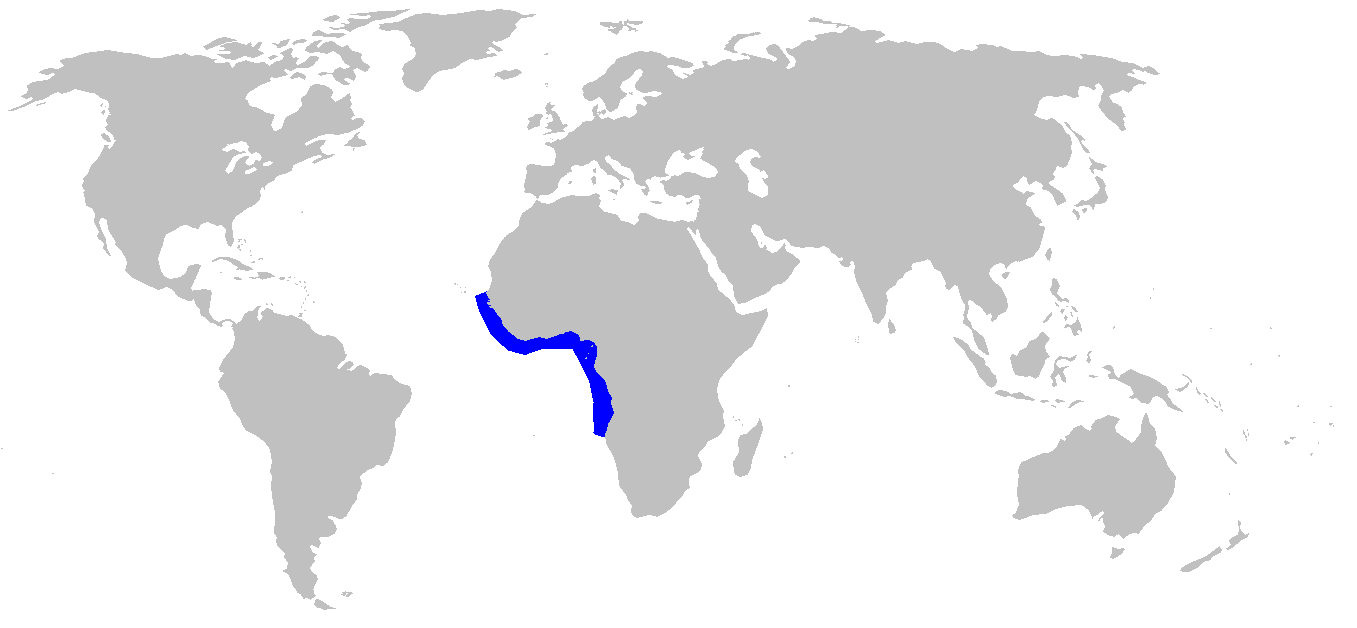
- Range of the barbeled houndshark

Synonyms
- Mustelus osborni Fowler, 1923; Triaenodon smithii Müller & Henle, 1839

= Barbeled houndshark =

Species of shark

The barbeled houndshark (Leptocharias smithii) is a species of ground shark and the only member of the family Leptochariidae. This demersal species is found in the coastal waters of the eastern Atlantic Ocean from Mauritania to Angola, at depths of 10–75 m (33–246 ft). It favors muddy habitats, particularly around river mouths. The barbeled houndshark is characterized by a very slender body, nasal barbels, long furrows at the corners of the mouth, and sexually dimorphic teeth. Its maximum known length is 82 cm (32 in).

Likely strong-swimming and opportunistic, the barbeled houndshark has been known to ingest bony fishes, invertebrates, fish eggs, and even inedible objects. It is viviparous with females bearing litters of 7 young; the developing embryos are sustained via a unique globular placental structure. The International Union for Conservation of Nature (IUCN) has assessed the barbeled houndshark as Vulnerable, as heavy fishing pressure occurs throughout its range and it is used for meat and leather.

== Taxonomy and phylogeny ==
The genus Leptocharias was coined by South African physician and zoologist Andrew Smith, without any associated species, in an 1838 Magazine of Natural History article by Johannes Müller and Friedrich Henle. Müller and Henle added a species a year later in their Systematische Beschreibung der Plagiostomen, but adopted the name Triaenodon smithii because they regarded Leptocharias as a junior synonym of Triaenodon. Later authors recognized the validity of Leptocharias, and shuffled it between the families Carcharhinidae and Triakidae before placing it in its own family. The type specimen is an adult male collected off Cabinda Province, Angola.

Because of its many unique characteristics, the evolutionary relationships of the barbeled houndshark are difficult to resolve. A morphological study by Compagno in 1988 was inconclusive on the relationship of Leptocharias to other carcharhiniform families. Similarly, a molecular phylogenetic study by López et al. in 2006 found that, though Leptocharias certainly belonged to a derived clade also containing the families Hemigaleidae, Triakidae, Carcharhinidae and Sphyrnidae, its position within that group changed depending on the DNA sequence and type of analysis used. Fossilized teeth belonging to an extinct relative, L. cretaceus, have been recovered from Late Cretaceous (Santonian and Campanian ages, 86–72 Ma) deposits in Britain.

== Distribution and habitat ==
The barbeled houndshark occurs along the western coast of Africa from Mauritania to northern Angola, though it may range as far north as the Mediterranean Sea. This species inhabits inshore waters 10–75 m (33–246 ft) deep, with temperatures of 20–27 °C (68–81 °F), salinities of 35–36 ppt, and dissolved oxygen levels of 3–4 ppm. It is typically found close to the bottom over mud, particularly around river mouths.

== Description ==
The barbeled houndshark has an extremely slender body and horizontally oval eyes equipped with internal nictitating membranes. A pair of tiny spiracles is present behind the eyes. Each nostril is preceded by a slender barbel. The mouth is long and strongly arched, with very long furrows at the corners extending onto both jaws. It has 46–60 upper tooth rows and 43–54 lower tooth rows; each tooth is small, with a narrow central cusp and a pair of lateral cusplets. Unusually for a shark, dental sexual dimorphism occurs, with the front teeth in males being greatly enlarged. The two dorsal fins are small and about equal in size; the first is positioned between the pectoral and pelvic fins, and the second over the anal fin. The dorsal margin of the caudal fin is smooth and lacks a notch (precaudal pit) at its base; the lower caudal fin lobe is virtually absent. This shark is a plain light gray above and whitish below. Males and females grow up to 77 and 82 cm (30 and 32 in) long, respectively.

== Biology and ecology ==
The barbeled houndshark seems to be an active swimmer, based on its strong musculature, long tail, short trunk, and small liver. It feeds on a wide variety of bottom- and shore-dwelling organisms. Crustaceans (including crabs, lobsters, and shrimp) are favored prey, while small bony fishes (including sardines, anchovies, snake eels, blennies, gobies, and flatfish), skate and flying fish eggs, octopus, and sponges are also eaten; miscellaneous objects such as feathers, vegetable scraps, and flowers have also been recovered from its stomach. Known parasites of this species include the copepods Eudactylina leptochariae and Thamnocephalus cerebrinoxius.

The enlarged anterior teeth of male barbeled houndsharks may function in mating behaviors. This species is viviparous; once the embryos exhaust their supply of yolk, they are nourished through a placental connection formed from the depleted yolk sac. Unlike any other shark, the yolk-sac placenta is globular or spherical. Off Senegal, females bear litters of seven pups around October, after a gestation period of at least four months. The largest fetuses on record measured 20 cm (7.9 in) long, which is presumably close to the birth size. Males reach sexual maturity at 55–60 cm (22–24 in) long, and females at 52–58 cm (20–23 in) long.

Barbeled Houndshark, is a shallow inshore inhabitant of muddy coastal waters from Mauritania to Angola, in the eastern Atlantic. It has nasal barbels, which are presumed to assist it in detection of prey in turbid water when the line of sight is poor.

== Human interactions ==
Harmless to humans, the barbeled houndshark is relatively common and probably of some economic importance in the West Africa region. It is caught incidentally by artisanal and commercial fisheries using hook-and-line, fixed-bottom gillnets, and bottom trawls. When retained, the meat is sold fresh, smoked, or dried and salted, and leather is made from the skin. The IUCN has assessed the barbeled houndshark as Vulnerable, noting that fishing pressure is intense throughout its range. However, no specific fishery data are available.
