= Witwatia =

Witwatia Temporal range: 37–33 Ma Eocene

Scientific classification
- Kingdom: Animalia
- Phylum: Chordata
- Class: Mammalia
- Order: Chiroptera
- Family: †Philisidae
- Genus: †Witwatia; Gunnell et al., 2008

Species
- W. schlosseri Gunnell et al., 2008 (type); W. eremicus Gunnell et al., 2008; W. sigei Ravel et al., 2012

Extinct genus of bats

Witwatia (from the Egyptian Arabic Wit Wat meaning "large, flapping wings") is an extinct genus of giant bat that contained two species which lived in the Al Fayyum in Egypt during the late Eocene (Priabonian epoch) and one species which lived in Tunisia during the early Eocene. It is known from a lower jaw and teeth. Three species have been named: the type species W. schlosseri, W. eremicus and W. sigei.

== Ecology ==
These were large-sized carnivorous bats, possessing large canines, robust jaws and slicing molars. Opportunistic frugivory has been suggested, but since rejected. The largest forms such as Witwatia schlosseri were comparable in size and possibly ecology to the modern Vampyrum spectrum.

Witwatia is not related to Aegyptonycteris, a contemporary genus of similarly sized giant bat, indicating that the Fayum Depression environment was home to at least two lineages of large-sized chiropterans that developed gigantism independently.

== See also ==
- Fayyum (fossil deposit)
