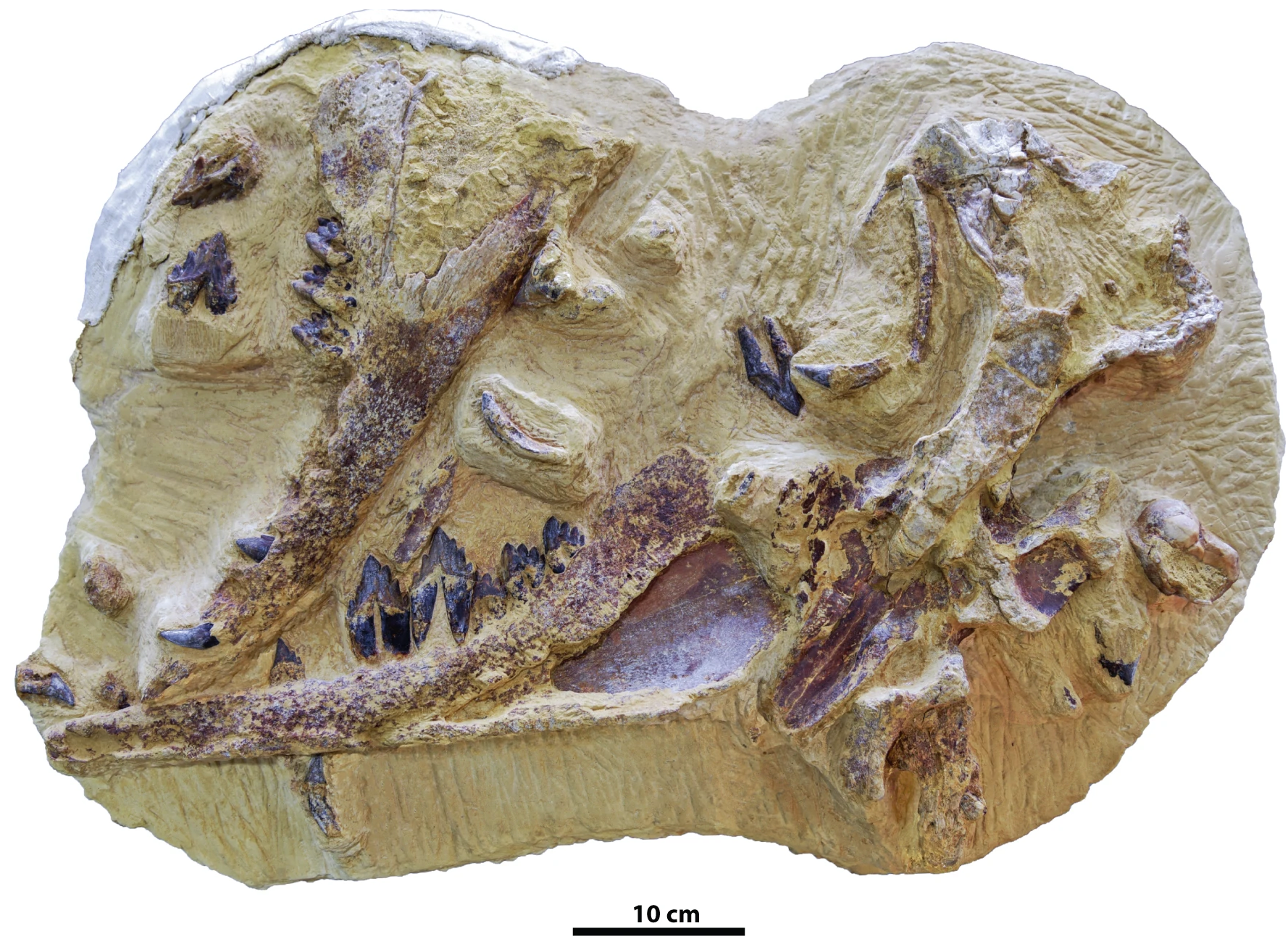
- Holotype specimen block

Scientific classification
- Kingdom: Animalia
- Phylum: Chordata
- Class: Mammalia
- Order: Artiodactyla
- Infraorder: Cetacea
- Family: †Basilosauridae
- Genus: †Tutcetus; Antar et al., 2023

Type species
- †Tutcetus rayanensis Antar et al., 2023

= Tutcetus =

Tutcetus Temporal range: Eocene (Lutetian-Bartonian), ~41 Ma

Extinct genus of basilosaurid whales

Tutcetus is an extinct genus of diminutive basilosaurid cetacean from the Bartonian of Egypt. Tutcetus, named after the child pharaoh Tutankhamun, is both one of the oldest known basilosaurids from Africa and the smallest member of the family. It is suggested that the type specimen, a subadult close to maturity, only measured approximately 2.5 m (8 ft 2 in) long. The genus is monotypic, only including the species T. rayanensis.

== History and naming ==
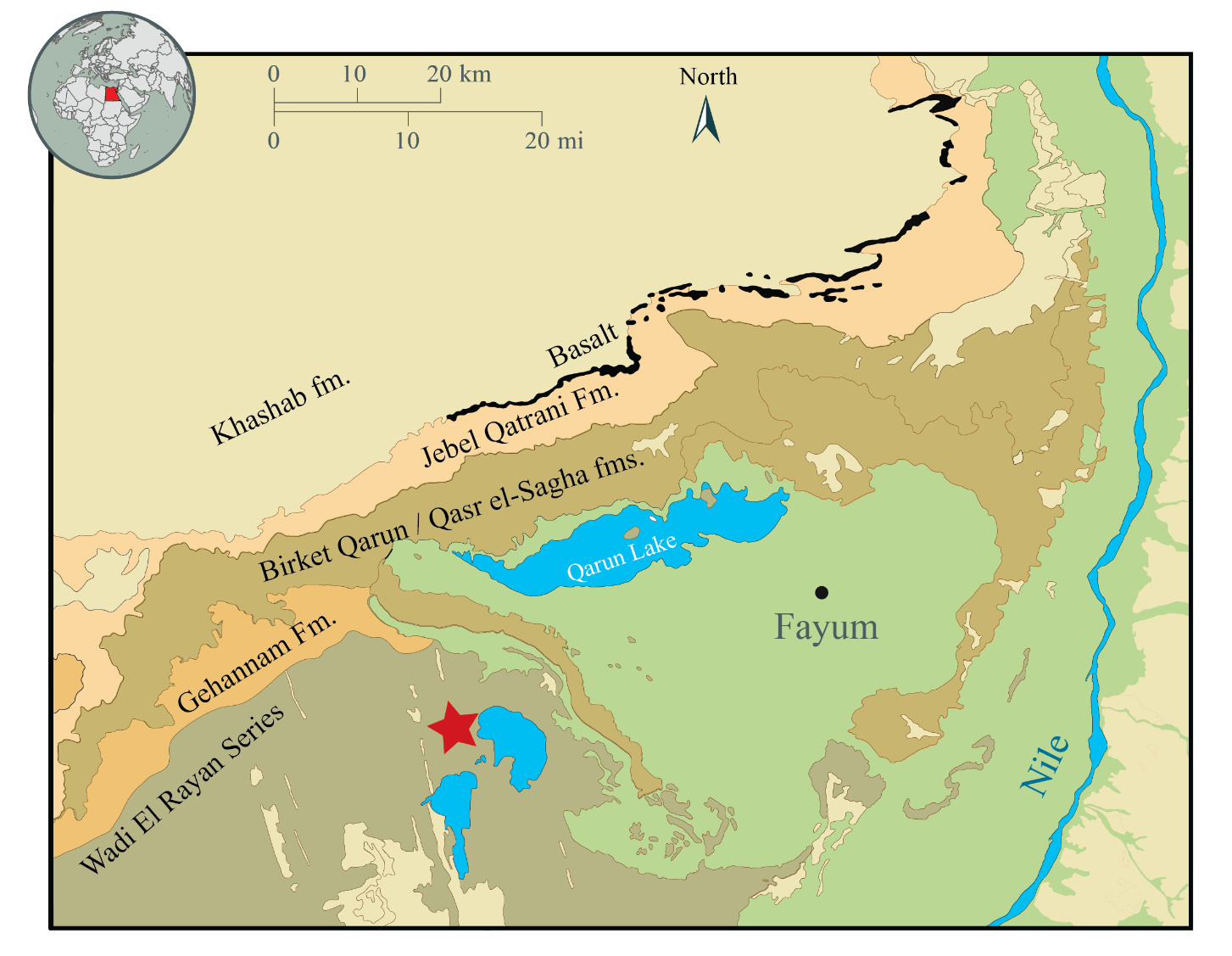
Map of the Fayum Depression, showing the locality (red star) of the holotype specimen

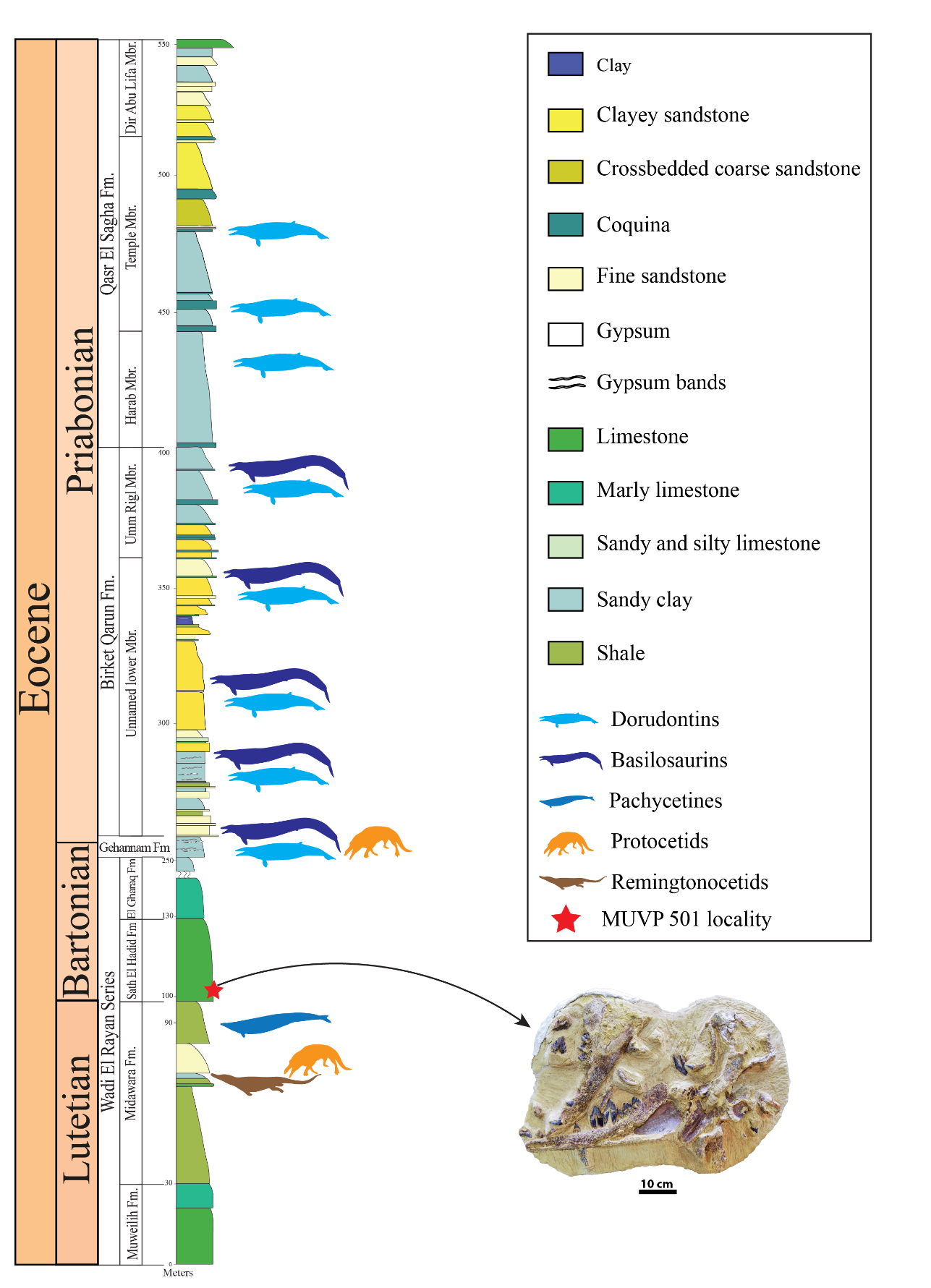
Stratigraphic context of the holotype

Tutcetus was first described in August 2023 on the basis of a single specimen, MUVP 501. The specimen consists of an incomplete skull found alongside both mandibles, the hyoid, and some of the first vertebrae of the neck. The remains stem from the Fayum Depression of Egypt, which is well known for its rich record of early whales. More specifically, the bones of Tutcetus stem from the Sath El-Hadid Formation, which dates to the early Bartonian (ca. 41 mya).

The name Tutcetus is a reference to the pharaoh Tutankhamun, also known as King Tut, a child king who died when he was only 18 years old. The name was chosen to reflect the small size and young age of Tutcetus. The second part of the generic name is the Ancient Greek word for whale, "cetus". The species name meanwhile means "from the Wadi El-Rayan Area" in reference to the type locality.

== Description ==
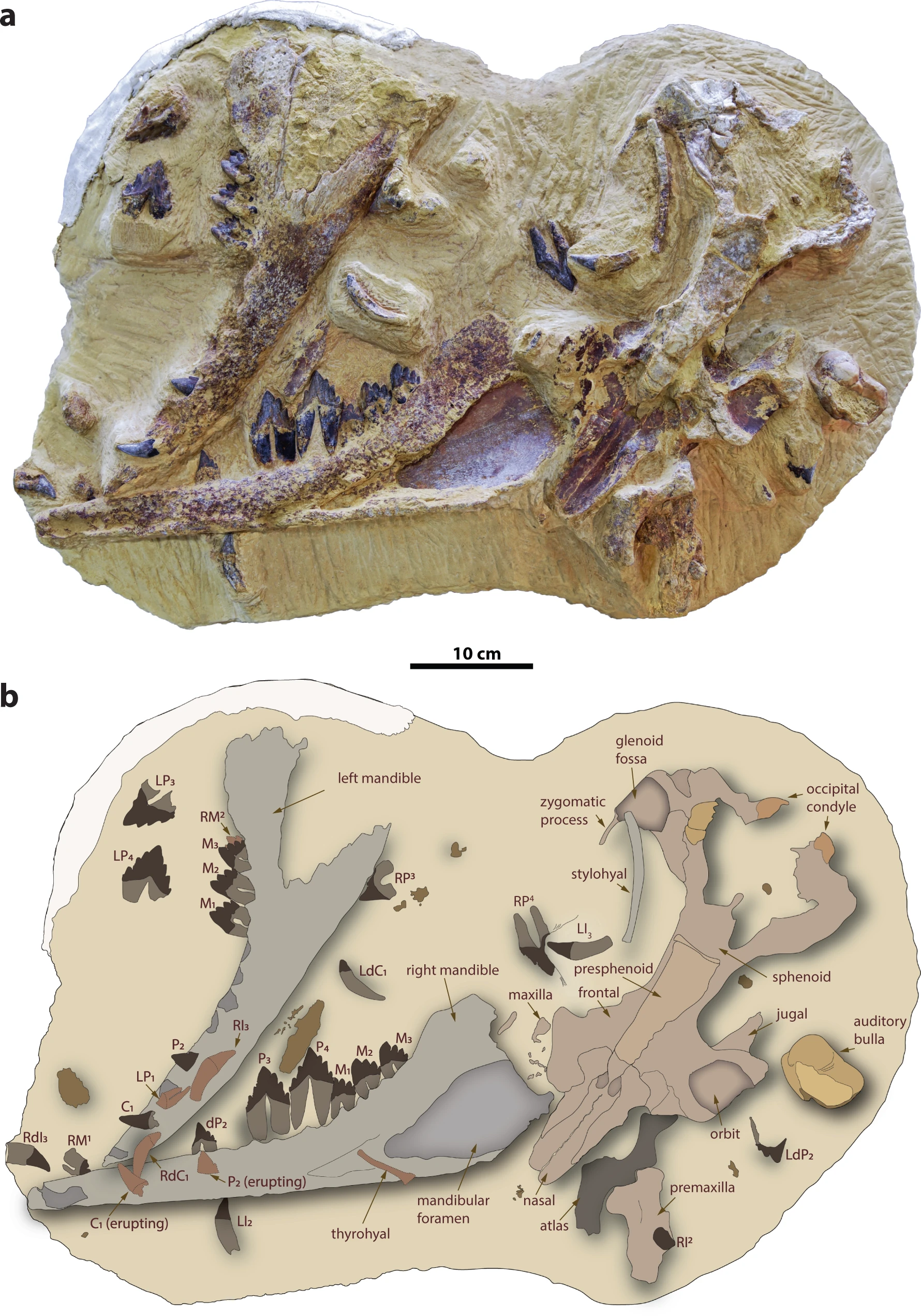
Holotype skull block and line interpretation

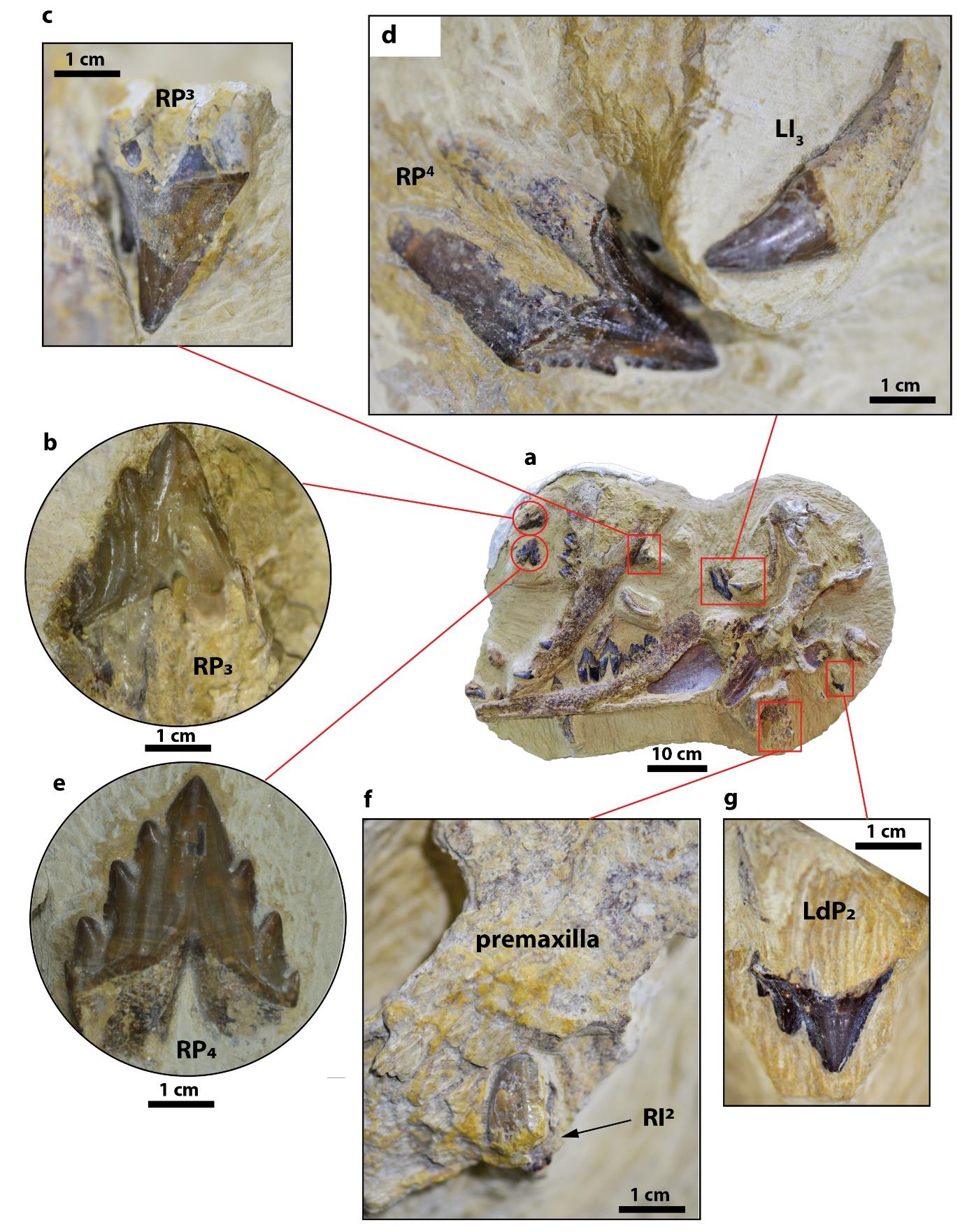
Molars teeth of Tutcetus

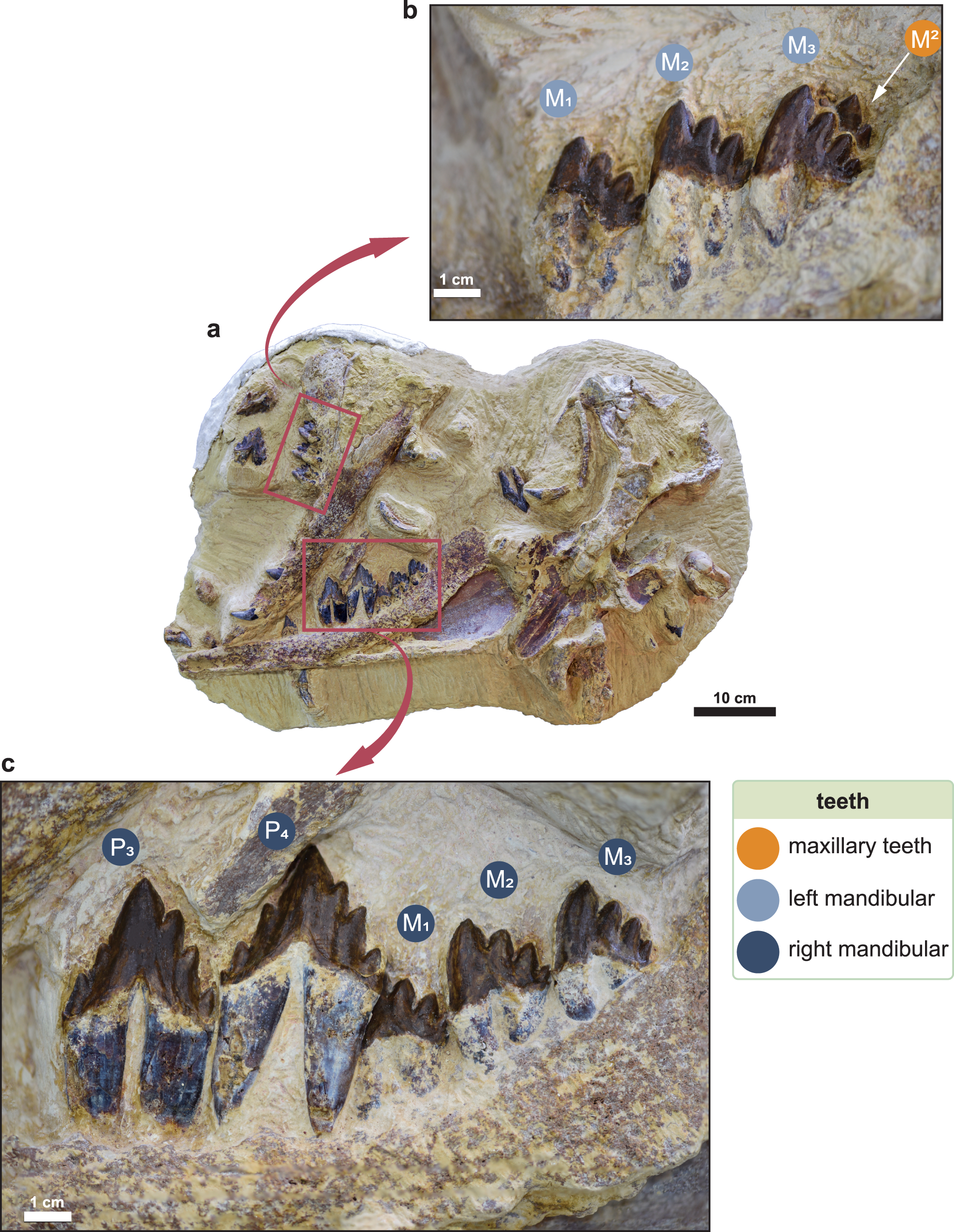
Molars teeth of Tutcetus

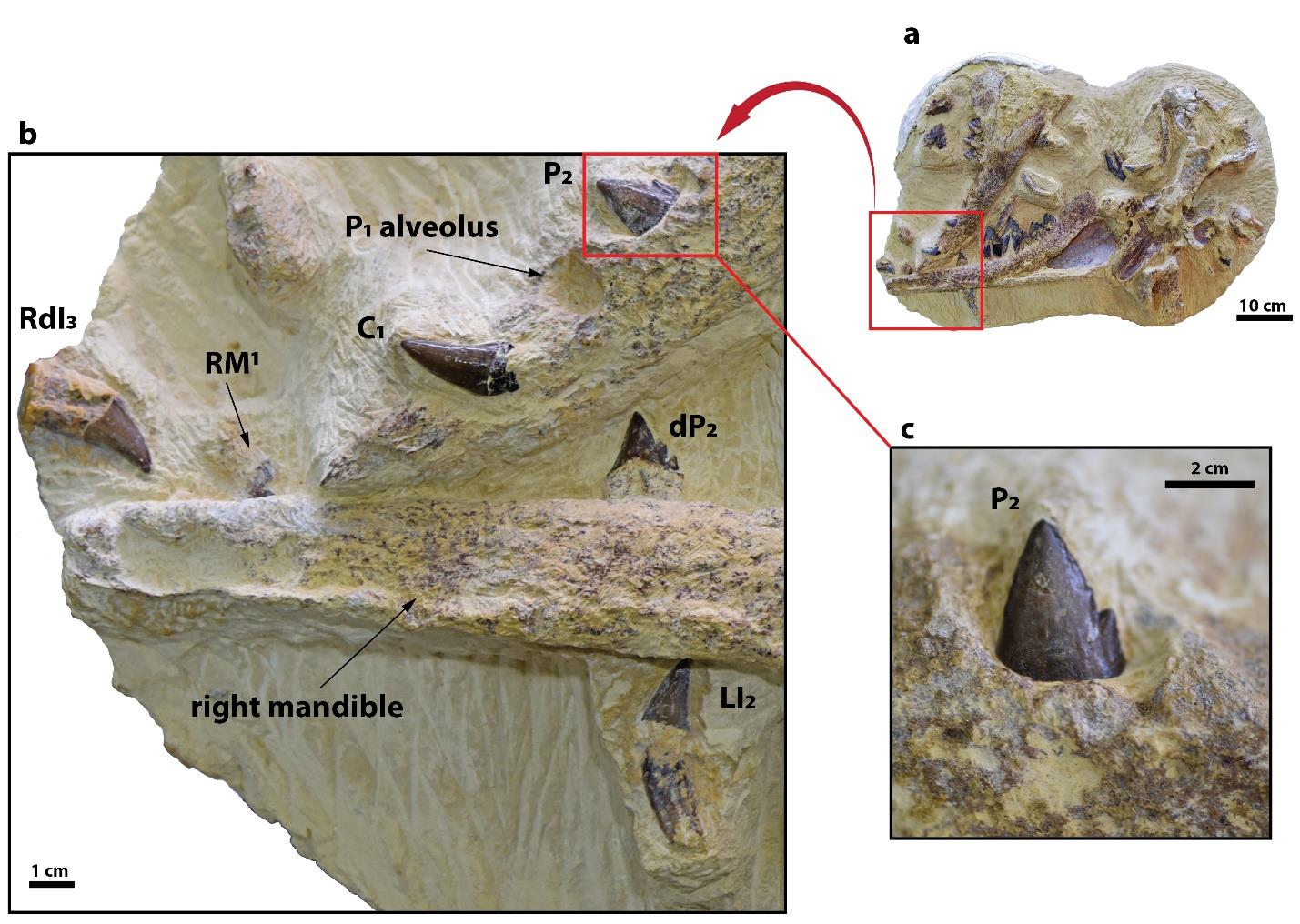
Non-molar teeth of Tutcetus

Most of the sides of the nasal bones is in contact with the maxillae, with only a small section towards the front of the nasals contacting the premaxillae.

The upper and lower premolars of Tutcetus differ from those of all other basilosaurids in the number of accessory tooth cusps. Tutcetus features two mesial accessory cusps (directed towards the front of the jaw) and three distal accessory cusps (directed towards the back of the jaw). The premolars also differ in some other aspects. They are notably more gracile than those of other basilosaurids and the tooth enamel is much smoother. The fourth premolar appears to have been the largest tooth in both the upper and lower jaw. The first premolar does not appear to have had a replacement, which suggests one of two things. Either the deciduous first premolar is retained even into adulthood, or the first premolar is developed without having a temporary precursor.

=== Size ===
Tutcetus may have been the smallest known basilosaurid with an estimated length of 2.51–2.55 m (8 ft 3 in – 8 ft 4 in) and an estimated weight of 180.4–187.1 kg (398–412 lb). Although maturity is difficult to determine in fossil, Antar and colleagues note several factors observed in Tutcetus that give clues to the animal's age at the time of its death. These factors include both the stage of the tooth eruption and the fusion of the bones, which are all more advanced than those of the oldest known Dorudon juvenile and suggest that the holotype of Tutcetus was an advanced subadult at the verge of adulthood.

== Classification ==
According to the Bayesian tip-dating analysis conducted for Tutcetus, Basilosauridae was a paraphyletic clade that included both traditional basilosaurids as well as all modern whale groups (Mysticeti and Odontoceti). Among core basilosaurids, Tutcetus was recovered within a weakly-supported group of early diverging, middle Eocene whales that also included Chrysocetus from North America and Africa as well as Ocucajea from South America. Within this group, termed the Tutcetus-clade by Antar et al., Tutcetus was found to be most closely related to Ocucajea, with Chrysocetus having diverged before the split between the other two.

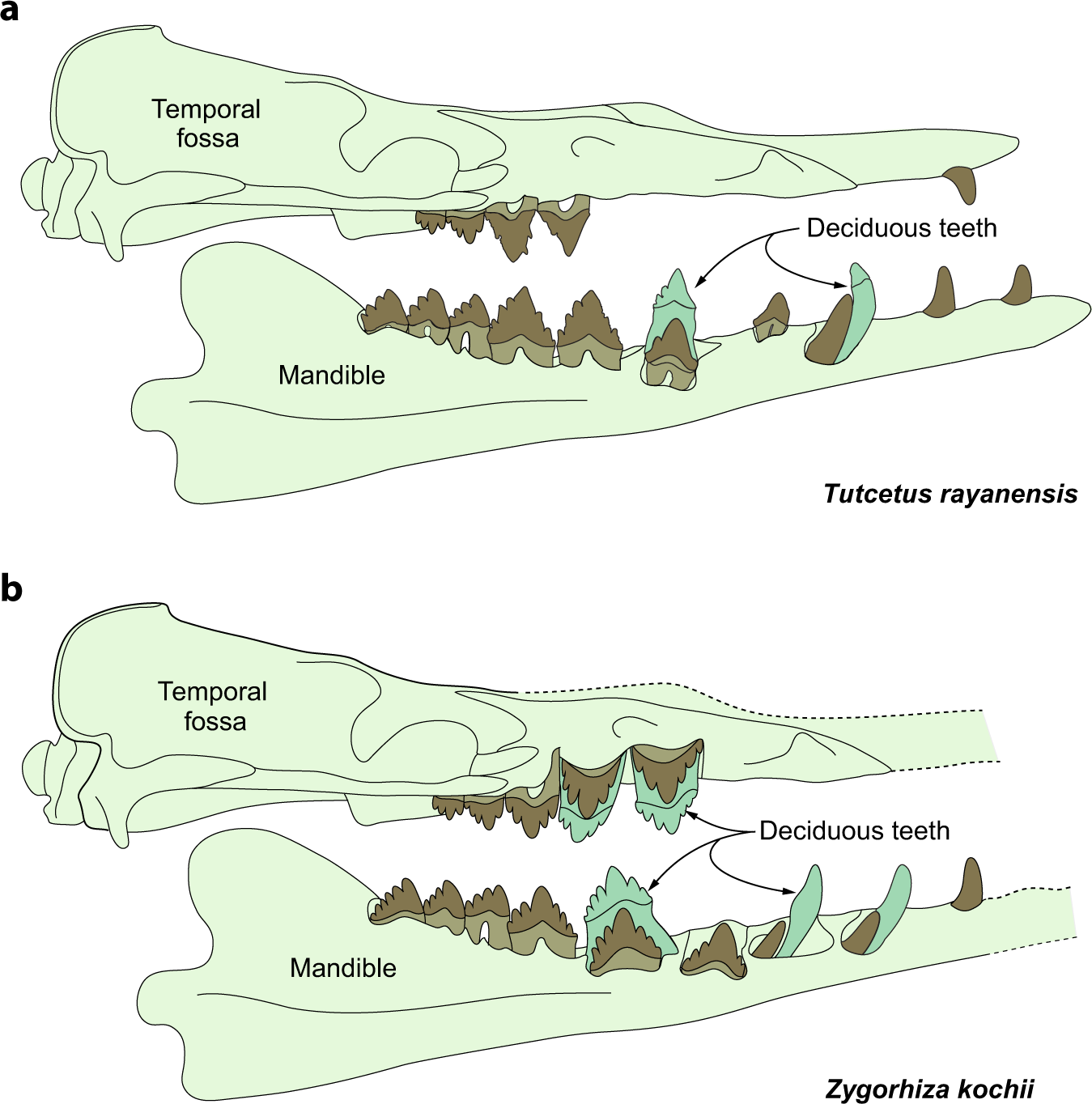
Tooth replacement of Tutcetus (top) and Zygorhiza (bottom) compared

- Pelagiceti
  - Eocetus
  - - - - Chrysocetus
        - - Ocucajea
          - Tutcetus rayanensis
      - - Zygorhiza
        - - - Saghacetus
            - Ancalecetus
          - - Basilosaurus
            - - Dorudon
              - Pontogeneus peruvianus
    - - - Supayacetus
        - - Pachycetus paulsonii
          - - Pachycetus wardii
            - Antaecetus aithai
      - Neoceti

== Paleobiology ==
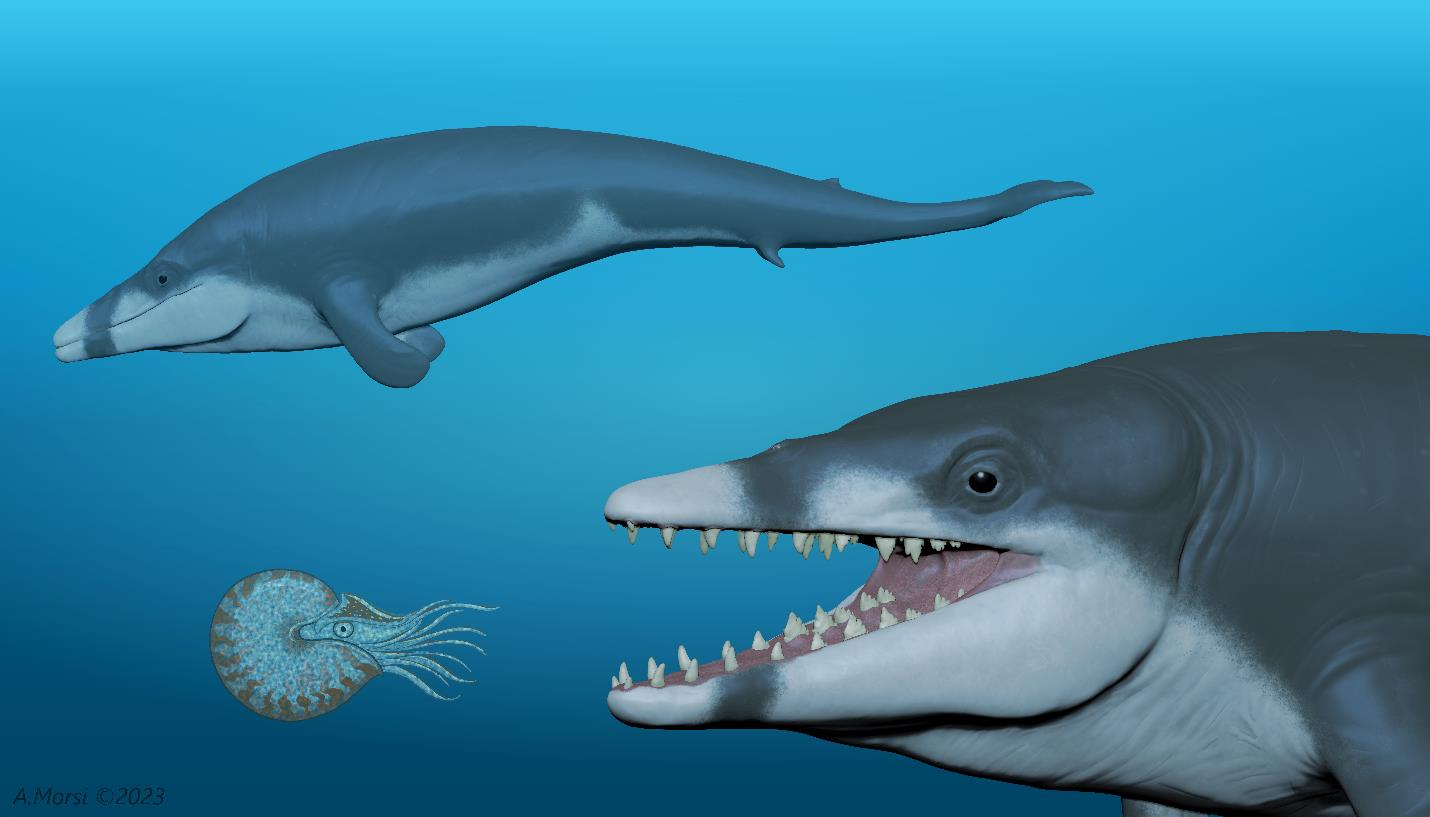
Life reconstruction of a Tutcetus pair, with one of them preying on a nautilid cephalopod

Mohamed Antar, Abdullah Gohar, Hesham Sallam and colleagues note that, beyond determining the age at which the animal died, the pattern of tooth replacement seen in Tutcetus may also give additional clues to how the animal lived. Tutcetus had molar teeth that erupted rather early, suggesting that the switch from deciduous to permanent teeth occurred rapidly in members of this species. According to Antar et al., rapid onset of tooth replacement is associated with animals that mature quickly and don't grow exceptionally old. They argue that the inferred low lifespan of Tutcetus, combined with its diminutive size, indicate that it was a precocial animal that grew quicker and died younger than the larger basilosaurids of its time.

The deposits in which Tutcetus was found in match the type of warm, shallow, tropical waters that whales will seek out as calving grounds, with authors suggesting that the locality represents just that. Antar and colleagues note that the stage of tooth replacement during which the holotype specimen of Tutcetus died might suggest that the species had a relatively younger infant mortality rate compared to the much better sampled Dorudon. They further highlight how such patterns would be expected in species that give birth every year to a single young. However, they also point out how this hypothesis cannot be tested until more material of Tutcetus is found and described.

Another aspect of Tutcetus' biology briefly explored in the type description is the relation between its environment and its small body size. While the small size of Tutcetus could be simply a left over of its smaller protocetid ancestry, it is also possible that the small size of it could be tied directly during the period of global warming known as the Lutetian thermal maximum. As aging and mortality are more prominent in warmer conditions, the small size and early maturing of Tutcetus could have been adaptations to these warmer conditions, allowing for the animal to reproduce more quickly. On the flipside, the large sizes of later basilosaurids such as Basilosaurus itself may have been driven by the middle Eocene climatic optimum or the brief cooling period between the Lutetian thermal maximum and the middle Eocene climatic optimum. Antar and colleagues conclude that body size in these early whales may have been primarily driven by climate, whereas body shape would have been mostly changed in response to competition.

== See also ==
- Evolution of cetaceans
