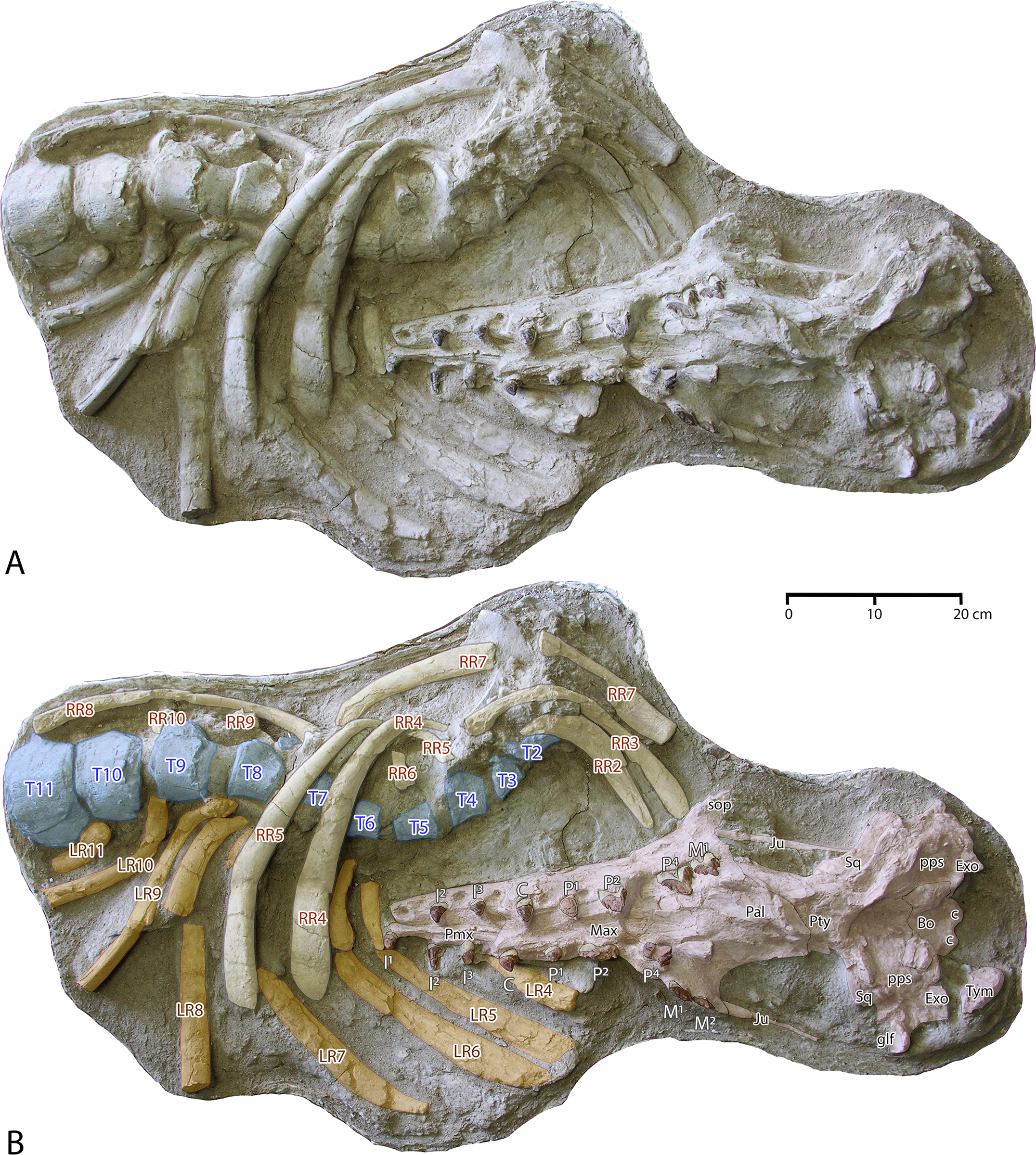

Scientific classification
- Kingdom: Animalia
- Phylum: Chordata
- Class: Mammalia
- Order: Artiodactyla
- Infraorder: Cetacea
- Family: †Basilosauridae
- Subfamily: †Pachycetinae
- Genus: †Antaecetus; Gingerich, Amane & Zhouri, 2022

Type species
- Antaecetus aithai (Gingerich & Zhouri, 2015)

= Antaecetus =

Antaecetus Temporal range: Bartonian

Extinct genus of pachycetine basilosaurid

Antaecetus is an extinct genus of pachycetine basilosaurid from the middle Eocene Aridal Formation of Morocco as well as the Fayum, Egypt. Antaecetus, although known from fewer remains in total, is markedly more complete than the closely related Pachycetus, with one specimen preserving large parts of the vertebral column up to the lumbar vertebrae and a well preserved skull. Based on these remains Antaecetus appears to have been smaller than Pachycetus, with a proportionally smaller head and much more gracile teeth. Both genera however share a highly osteosclerotic and pachyostotic skeleton, greatly increasing their weight and possibly serving as additional ballast. In turn the elongation and thickening of the vertebrae severely impacts the animals movement, most likely causing it to have been much slower and far less mobile than other archaeocetes. It has been proposed that Antaecetus was a slow moving inhabitant of shallow coastal waters, where it would ambush fish and marine molluscs. Only a single species of Antaecetus is known, Antaecetus aithai, which was originally described as a species of Pachycetus.

== History and naming ==
Initially thought to represent a species of Platyosphys (now Pachycetus), Antaecetus was described in 2015 based on fossils from the Aridal Formation of the Gueran depression, southwestern Morocco. The fossil material, consisting of a partial skull (later thought to have been that of Eocetus), a tympanic bulla and various vertebrae was recovered in 2014 along with remains of various other basal whales, leading to the recognition of the Gueran depression as an important assemblage for research on early cetaceans. Several years after this initial paper was published a second publication was released, dealing in part with the taxonomy of Platyosphys in an attempt to clarify its status. At the same time, following the discovery of an additional, much better preserved specimen from El Brije, P. aithai was reexamined and found to be sufficiently distinct to warrant it being placed in its own genus, which the authors dubbed Antaecetus. The principal specimen of said study consists of a cranium, the second to eleventh thoracic vertebrae and an additional ten lumbar vertebrae. The same team further established the clade Pachycetinae based on shared characteristics of the skeleton that distinguish Antaecetus and Pachycetus from other basilosaurids. Material of Antaecetus has also been recovered from Fayum, Egypt, but not yet described or catalogued.

Antaecetus was named after Antaeus (also known as Antaois or Anti), a figure from Greek mythology, in combination with the word "cetus" meaning whale. In the myths Antaeus was the son of Gaia and the sea god Poseidon and was said to reside in western North Africa with his tomb being found in Morocco. The species name derives from Amer Ait Ha, an experienced fossil collector who was responsible for guiding researchers to the Gueran locality.

== Description ==
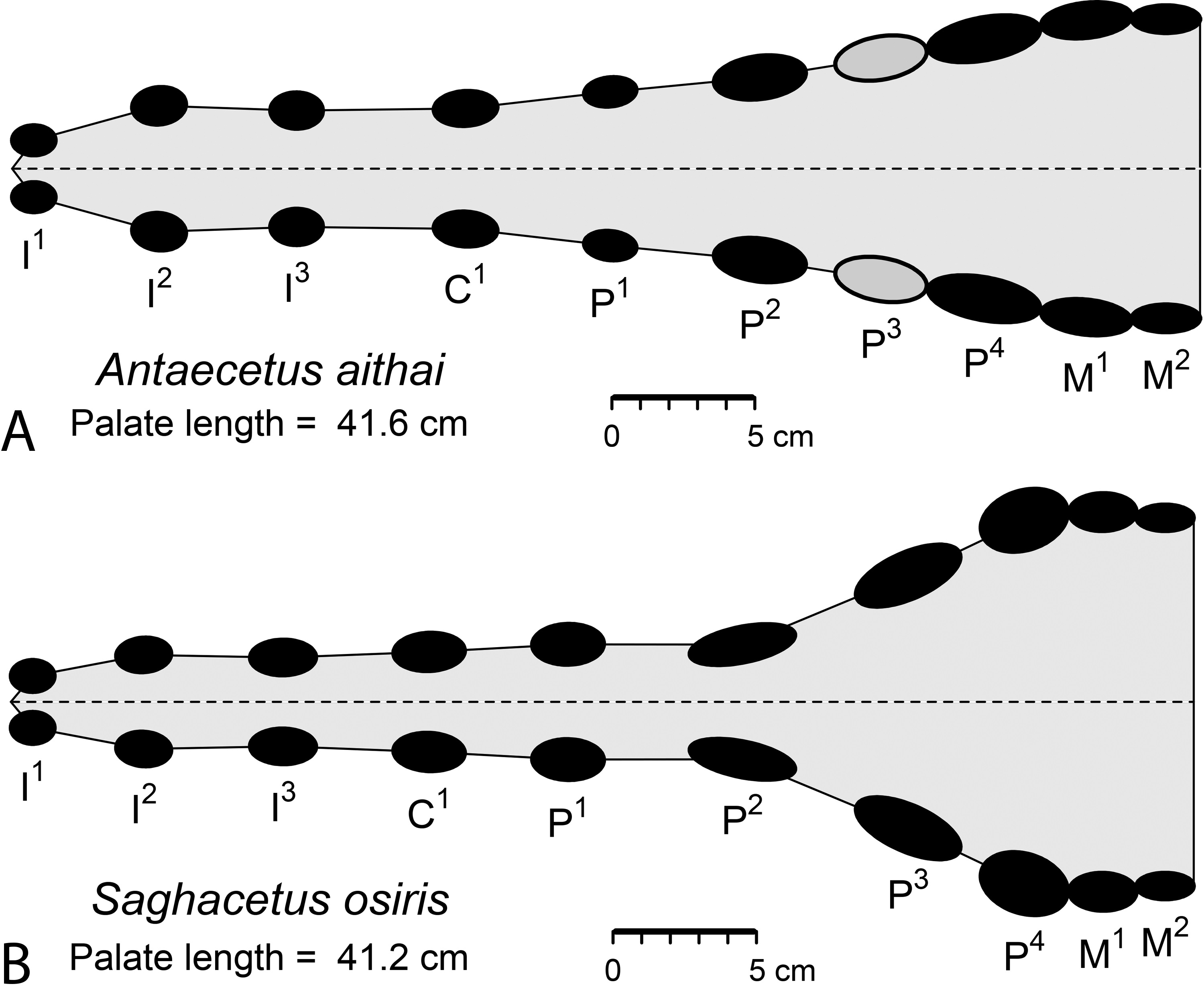
Antaecetus (top) compared to Saghacetus (bottom)

The skull of Antaecetus is noticeably smaller than that of Pachycetus relative to its body, measuring a total of 69.5 cm (27.4 in) from the tip of the premaxillae to the occipital condyles. At its widest point the skull measures 31.4 cm (12.4 in). Antaecetus possesses three incisors in either premaxilla, followed by a canine tooth, four premolars and two molars in either maxilla. This means the dental formula for the upper jaw is 3.1.4.2., which is the standard formula for basilosaurids. The connection between the rostrum and the basicranium is formed by a narrow yet robust intertemporal constriction, which consists of the pterygoid and palatine bones. The constriction is bordered by the temporal fossae, which in turn sit next to the slender jugal that connects the maxillae with the squamosals. In its overall form the skull of Antaecetus resembles the typical basilosaurid condition, featuring a narrow rostrum connected to a much wider basicranium.

The teeth are much more gracile than those of Pachycetus and lack the crenulated tooth enamel, instead having a smooth surface. The three incisors are single-rooted and conical with laterally compressed crowns. Among them the second incisors stand out as being more caniniform than the others and also projecting much further out of the tooth socket than the other two. Overall the canine teeth are similar to the incisors and roughly the same size as the second canine. Philip Gingerich and colleagues note that canine size may be sexually dimorphic in archaeocetes, meaning that the El Brije specimen could be a female. Following the canines there is a diastema, a toothless section that separates these early teeth from the premolars and molars. The first premolar is regarded as being among the distinguishing features between Antaecetus and Pachycetus. In the former, the tooth has a single root much like the incisors and canines and different from the double-rooted structure displayed by the second premolar and the teeth further back. In Pachycetus on the other hand the first premolar is already double-rooted. Furthermore, the posterior premolars have three accessory cusps or denticles on either side of the central apical cusp, one less than what is seen in its relative. The molars only have two accessory cusps each and the second molar is much simpler than the first. Though the protocones of the molars have been lost, the teeth of Antaecetus still retain an expansion in this area hinting at where the structure was once located. Both molars have a weak lateral cingulum, but differ in that the first has a stronger medial cingulum while there is none in the second molar.

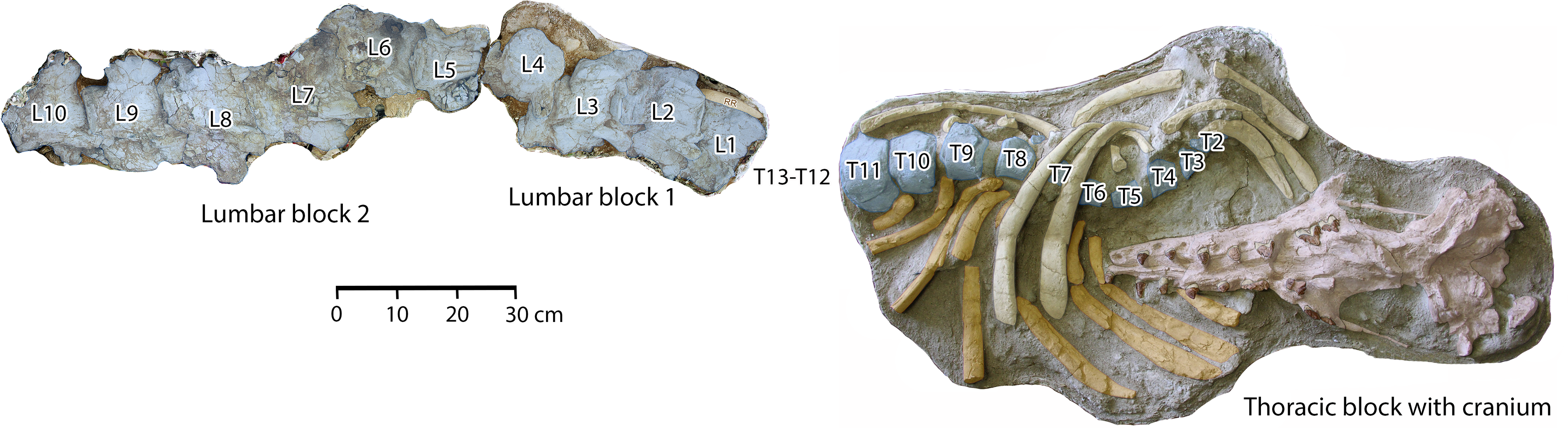
The full skeleton of the El Brije Antaecetus specimen

The anterior vertebrae of the thorax (torso) of Antaecetus show clear tapering, with the posterior (back) end being much wider relative to the beginning of the vertebrae. These early vertebrae show a clear transition in how they articulate with the ribs, as they have capitular facets for the reception of the heads of the ribs on both ends of the centrum. However, further down the spine these facets become restricted to the anterior end and resemble more of a pit than a true facet. These middle thoratic vertebrae furthermore display a developed diapophysis that articules with the tubercles of the ribs. The presence of such a diapophysis is particularly highlighted by Gingerich and Samir Zhouri, who used this feature to distinguish A. aithai from the two species of Pachycetus recognized by them. The diapophysis is eventually lost by the posterior vertebrae of the thorax and the rib articulation is altered even further, with the capitular facets becoming even more pit-like and now being situated atop the elevated surface of the parapophysis. It has been noted that this would suggest that the ribs didn't articulate through synovial joints like in other basilosaurids but through cartilage or ligaments like in early sirenians. The neural spines are described as slender and relatively short. The lumbar vertebrae strongly resemble those of Pachycetus, with both the centra themselves and the robust transverse processes being elongated, the latter stretching almost the entire length of their respective centra.

Another significant trait of the vertebrae is their density relative to those of other basilosaurids. The vertebrae are osteosclerotic and pachyostotic, meaning that they feature thickened rings of cortical bone that are denser than would be typical. Gingerich and Zhouri initially characterize the vertebrae as being unique in containing cones of cancellous bone instead of cylinders, though this notion was later rejected by Henk Jan van Vliet as having been much more common than initially assumed. The lower surface of the centra appears to have had a pockmarked-texture, caused by the presence of nutrient foramina that penetrate the cortical bone. The ribs of Antaecetus are robust, but only the anterior ones are pachyostotic.

Antaecetus is described as having been a medium-sized basilosaurid, significantly smaller than the related species Pachycetus paulsonii, slightly smaller than Pachycetus wardii and in a similar size range as Pappocetus, a contemporary protocetid. The lumbar vertebrae of large males are in the same size range as those of female Eocetus and the skull is similar in size to that of Saghacetus.

== Phylogeny ==
A phylogenetic analysis conducted in 2023 confirmed the hypothesis that Antaecetus was a close relative of Pachycetus, the relationship between them being strongly supported by the results and validating the clade Pachycetinae that was erected to contain the two taxa. Within the group, Antaecetus was recovered as the most derived species and notably the sister taxon to Pachycetus wardii from the eastern United States, suggesting that Pachycetus may be paraphyletic. Although typically considered basilosaurids, the same study recovered pachycetines as being more closely related to the clade Neoceti, rendering Basilosauridae paraphyletic as well.

- Pelagiceti
  - Eocetus
  - - - - Chrysocetus
        - - Ocucajea
          - Tutcetus rayanensis
      - - Zygorhiza
        - - - Saghacetus
            - Ancalecetus
          - - Basilosaurus
            - - Dorudon
              - Pontogeneus peruvianus
    - - - Supayacetus
        - - Pachycetus paulsonii
          - - Pachycetus wardii
            - Antaecetus aithai
      - Neoceti

== Paleobiology ==
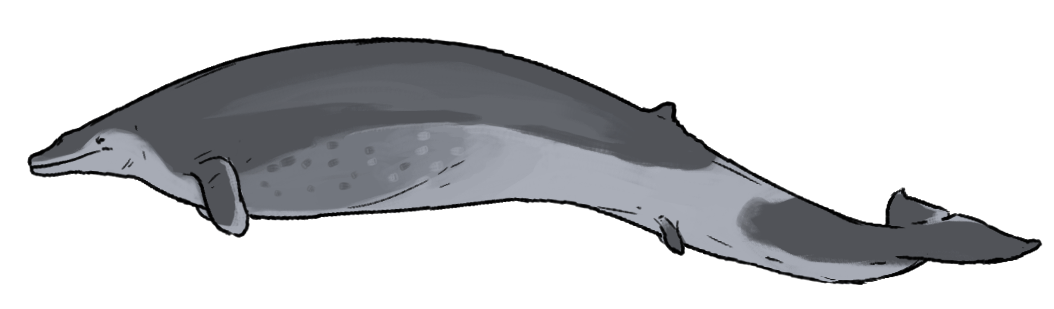
Live reconstruction

The elongation of the vertebrae in Antaecetus resembles what is known from Basilosaurus, consequently supporting the idea that their locomotion could have been similar. This would suggest that Antaecetus swam by undulating the entire body. However, the length of the transverse processes would have restricted this movement somewhat. More specifically, the reduced space between the processes meant that the side-to-side flexibility was limited, limiting the animal to swimming through up- and downstrokes. The increase in bone density would have further impacted its lifestyle, with Gingerich and colleagues listing a variety of potential causes for such an adaptation. For instance, the corresponding increase in ballast and lung volume would have been useful for a slow-moving animal, possibly one feeding in shallow waters close to the ocean floor. The articulation of the ribs would also fall in line with this interpretation, as ligamentous or cartilaginous rib articulation allows for the thorax to expand during air intake while also allowing the animal to collapse the thorax at the ocean floor to minimize buoyancy. At the same time, the increased density took a further toll on the mobility of Antaecetus, likely making it much slower to accelerate in addition to its poor maneuverability.

From this Gingerich, Ayoub Amane and Zhouri hypothesize that Antaecetus, like Pachycetus, was a slow-moving animal inhabiting shallow coastal waters. However, its precise ecology proved to be more elusive, with its small, gracile teeth unfit to deal with either vegetation or hard-shelled prey (ruling out lifestyles akin to those of manatees and sea otters). Feeding directly from the ocean floor is also dismissed, as contact with sediment would lead the teeth to undergo rapid abrasion. The poor maneuverability and slow speed of Antaecetus indicate that it was not built for pursuing prey either, leaving the possibility that Antaecetus was an ambush hunter preying on fish and invertebrates.

The remains of Antaecetus are known from the Aridal Formation of Morocco, where the animal coexisted with at least 5 additional early whales of different sizes. Antaecetus was one of the larger whales of this assemblage, together with the large protocetid Pappocetus and the basilosaurid Eocetus schweinfurthii, which was the largest cetacean of the locality. The remaining three taxa were all smaller than Antaecetus, including two indeterminate protocetids and the small basilosaurid Chrysocetus fouadassaii, which in terms of size falls in between the ranges of the afforementioned protocetids.
