= Aridal Formation =

Geologic formation in Morocco

- Stratigraphic range: Middle Eocene, Lutetian–Priabonian
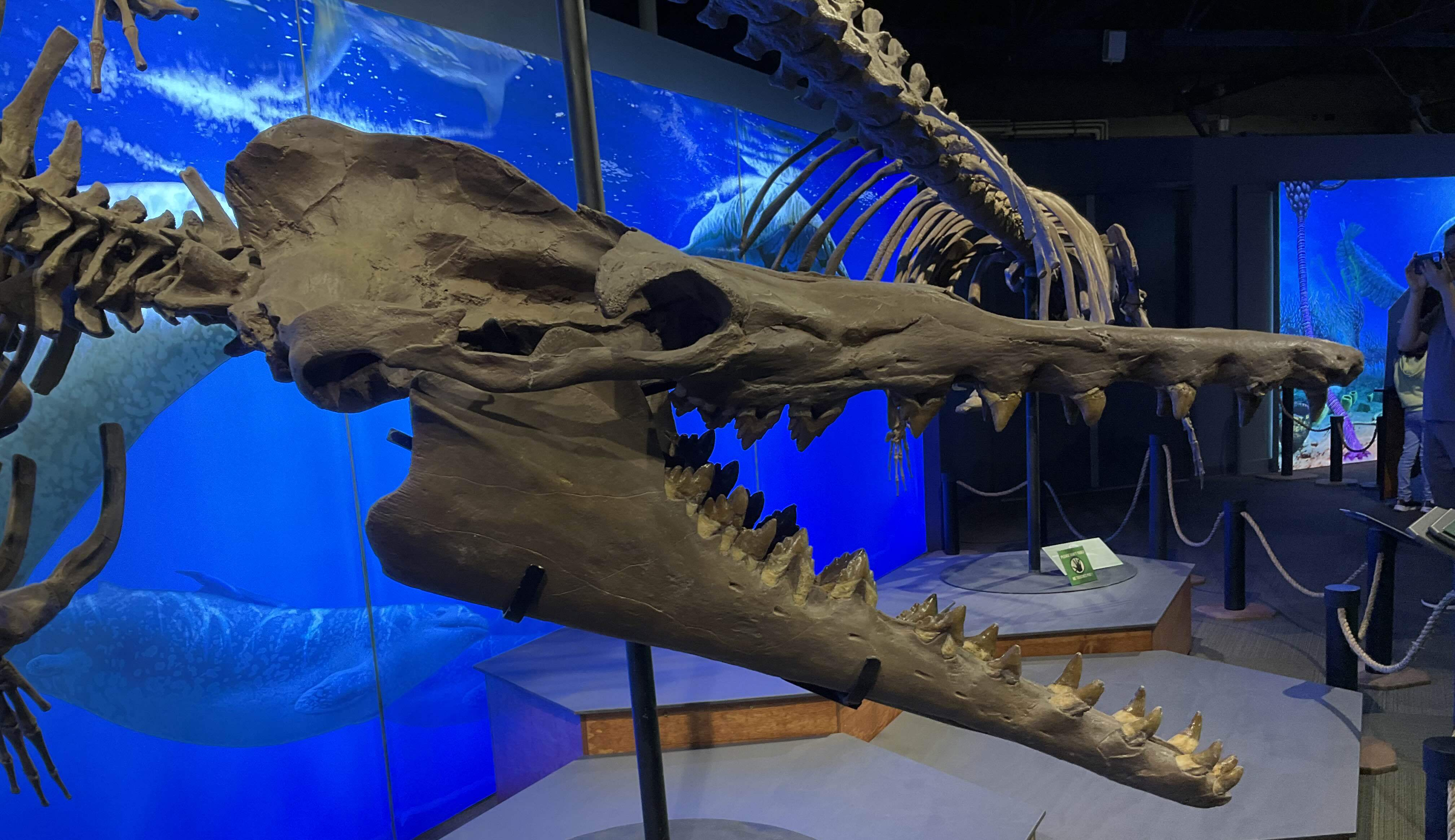
- Chrysocetus fouadassii cast
- Type: Geological formation

Lithology
- Other: sandstone, marl

Location
- Country: Morocco

The Aridal Formation in the Sahara Desert of southwestern Morocco is a fossil formation with rocks dating to the Lutetian - Priabonian (47.8 - 33.9 million years ago), preserving a middle Eocene shallow coastal environment.

The formation represents the world's richest Bartonian archaic whale assemblage, including protocetids and basilosaurids.

== Paleobiota ==
=== Birds ===
Includes the earliest occurrence of the genus Pelagornis, extending its fossil record back by at least 10 million years.

Taxa	Rock Unit	Age	Image
Pelagornis sp.	Gueran	Bartonian	
Pelagornithidae indet.	El Breij Unit II	Bartonian	

=== Mammals ===
Alongside a rich assemblage of archaic whale taxa including two additional unnamed protocetid species, there are also possible remains of the earliest occurrence of Barytherium.

Taxa	Rock Unit	Age	Image
Pappocetus lugardi	Gueran, Sabkha of Lebreij	Bartonian	
Eocetus schweinfurthi	Gueran, El Breij Unit II, El Breij Unit III	Bartonian	
Chrysocetus fouadassii	Gueran	Bartonian	
Antaecetus aithai	Gueran	Bartonian	
? Barytherium sp.	Gueran	Bartonian	

=== Reptiles ===
There are at least three indeterminate species of turtles: two marine cryptodires, a cheloniid, a dermochelyid, and a possible littoral pleurodire. Two species of longirostrine crocodylians are present, including a gavialoid similar to Eogavialis africanum (which is typically known from younger strata), and one too fragmentary to identify beyond being a crocodyliform.

Taxa	Rock Unit	Age	Image
Pterosphenus schweinfurthi	Gueran	Bartonian	
Palaeophis africanus	El Breij, Unit I	Lutetian	
Palaeophiidae indet.	Sabkha of Lebreij	Bartonian	
Cordichelys antiqua	El Breij, Unit I	Lutetian	
Cheloniidae indet.	Gueran	Bartonian	
Dermochelyidae indet.	Gueran	Bartonian	
Pleurodira indet.	Gueran	Bartonian	
Gavialoidea indet.	Gueran	Bartonian	
Crocodyliformes indet.	Gueran	Bartonian	
Crocodylia indet.	El Breij Unit I, Sabkha of Lebreij	Lutetian Bartonian	

=== Cartilaginous Fish ===
Taxa	Rock Unit	Age	Image
Galeocerdo eaglesomei	Gueran	Bartonian	
Pristis lathami	Gueran	Bartonian	
Propristis schweinfurthi	Gueran	Bartonian	
Macrorhizodus praecursor	Gueran	Bartonian	
Hemipristis curvatus	Gueran	Bartonian	
Carcharias koerti	Gueran	Bartonian	
Otodus cf. sokolowi	Gueran	Bartonian	
Tethylamna cf. twiggsensis	Gueran	Bartonian	
Carcharhinus sp.	Gueran	Bartonian	
Abdounia sp.	Gueran	Bartonian	
Physogaleus sp.	Gueran	Bartonian	

=== Bony Fish ===
Taxa	Rock Unit	Age	Image
Cylindracanthus sp.	Gueran, El Breij Unit I	Bartonian, Lutetian	
