= Alvania burtoni =

Scientific classification
- Kingdom: Animalia
- Phylum: Mollusca
- Class: Gastropoda
- Subclass: Caenogastropoda
- Order: Littorinimorpha
- Superfamily: Rissooidea
- Family: Rissoidae
- Genus: Alvania
- Species: †A. burtoni

Binomial name
- †Alvania burtoni Glibert, 1962

Synonyms
- † Alvania (Acinulus) burtoni Glibert, 1962

Species of gastropod

Alvania burtoni is an extinct species of minute sea snail, a marine gastropod mollusc or micromollusk in the family Rissoidae.

== Description ==
The length of the shell attains 4.3 mm, its diameter is 2.3 mm.

== Distribution ==
Fossils of this species were in Bartonian strata near Barton, Great Britain.
