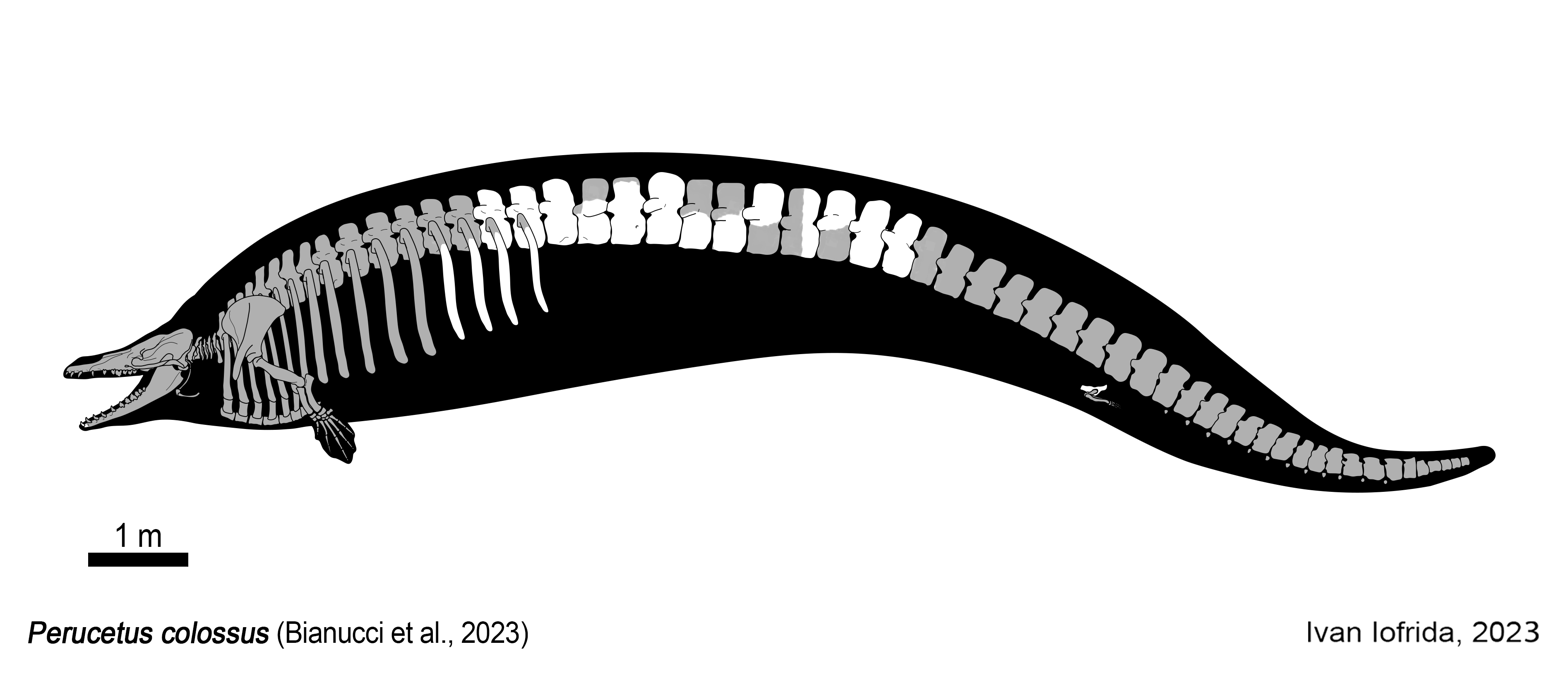
- Holotype skeletal drawing of Perucetus colossus

Scientific classification
- Kingdom: Animalia
- Phylum: Chordata
- Class: Mammalia
- Infraclass: Placentalia
- Order: Artiodactyla
- Infraorder: Cetacea
- Family: †Basilosauridae
- Genus: †Perucetus; Bianucci et al., 2023

Type species
- †Perucetus colossus Bianucci et al., 2023

= Perucetus =

Perucetus Temporal range: Bartonian 39.8–37.84 Ma

Extinct genus of early cetacean

Perucetus is an extinct genus of an early whale from Peru that lived during the Bartonian age of the middle Eocene. Perucetus is the largest Eocene whale, with length estimates varying from 15–16 meters (49–52 ft) to 17–20 meters (56–66 ft). It was initially claimed to have rivaled or exceeded the modern blue whale in weight, partly due to the incredibly thick and dense bones this animal possessed, coupled with its already great size, but subsequent studies argued that it was significantly lighter. The ecology of Perucetus also remains largely mysterious. Based on the fossils, it was likely a slow-moving inhabitant of shallow waters. Its diet can only be speculated, but one suggestion proposes that it may have fed on benthic animals like crustaceans and molluscs living on the ocean floor. Only a single species is currently known, P. colossus.

== History and naming ==
Perucetus is known from a variety of bones; namely, thirteen vertebrae, four ribs, and some parts of the pelvic region. All bones are from the same individual (MUSM 3248) and were collected from the Yumaque Member of the Paracas Formation. The remains of the Perucetus are currently under protection and on display at the Natural History Museum of Lima, which belongs to the National University of San Marcos, the main institution of the team of Peruvian paleontologists involved in the discovery.

The name Perucetus derives from the whale's country of origin, Peru, while the species name references the enormous size of the animal.

== Description ==
The innominate bone of Perucetus is highly reduced but still features a well-developed acetabulum, a condition considered ancestral among whales. The innominate, however, differs in shape from that of Basilosaurus, and the proximal end of the ilium is notably more robust than in other early Pelagiceti. The centra of the lumbar vertebrae are greatly elongated like in basilosaurines and pachycetines but do not quite reach the proportions of the most extreme members of said groups. The ends of the ribs are large and club shaped, another feature similar to Basilosaurus.

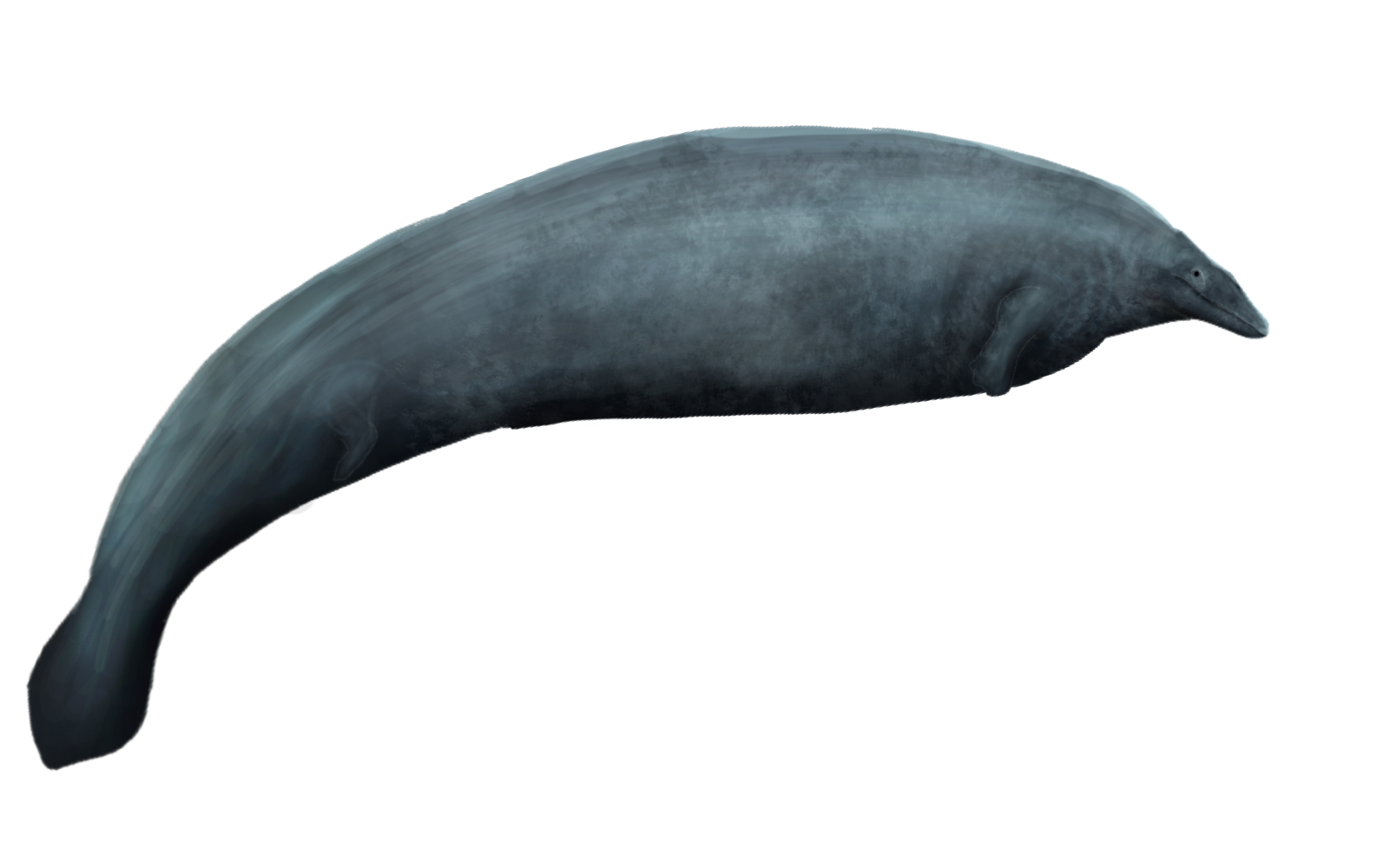
Restoration with speculative manatee-like fluke.

The most characteristic feature of Perucetus is the high degree of pachyosteosclerosis present in the bones of the body, which means that the bones are simultaneously thicker (pachyostotic) and denser (osteosclerotic) than in any other known cetacean. Pachyosteosclerosis and the associated bone mass increase (BMI) is known in a variety of other marine mammals like sirenians and from some other basilosaurids — namely, members of the subfamily Pachycetinae — but no other whales approach the levels of BMI seen in Perucetus. Bianucci and colleagues highlight several lines of evidence to suggest that the bone mass increase was not the result of any pathologies. Besides the presence of BMI in pachycetines, the increase is uniformly present in Perucetus, while the BMI would be inconsistent if caused by some disease or other condition. Due to pachyostosis, the vertebrae are greatly inflated, making them nearly twice as voluminous as those of a 25 m (82 ft) long blue whale. The increase in bone mass is also observed in the microanatomy of the bone. The ribs are entirely composed of dense bone and lack the medullary cavity seen in the bones of other animals. The vascular channels that penetrate the bone are narrow, not only indicating the maturity of the animal but also adding to the already dense nature of the bones.

=== Disputed size estimates ===
As only a few vertebrae of Perucetus are known, estimates of the whale's total length vary by how many of each type of vertebrae it is assumed to have in the spinal column. When scaling to the skeleton of Cynthiacetus peruvianus, which had the most complete fossil skeleton of a basilosaurid at the time and has a 20 thoracic and 17 lumbar vertebrae, Bianucci et al. (2023) yielded a total skeletal length estimate of 20.0 meters (65.6 ft). When using Basilosaurus isis (18 thoracic and 19 lumbar) and Dorudon atrox (17 thoracic and 20 lumbar) as proxies, a slightly larger maximum length of 20.1 meters (66 ft) is yielded. When scaling to Pachycetus wardii, which has the fewest vertebrae in the family and reflects the likelihood that Perucetus had fewer vertebrae than most basilosaurids, a conservative length of 17.0 meters (55.8 ft) is calculated.

Additionally, according to the first estimate, Perucetus may have ranged in weight from 85–340 t (84–335 long tons; 94–375 short tons) with an average of 180 t (180 long tons; 200 short tons). The 17–20-meter (56–66 ft) skeletal structure alone would have accounted for 5.3–7.6 t (5.2–7.5 long tons; 5.8–8.4 short tons), which is already two to three times the weight of the skeleton of a 25 m (82 ft) long blue whale. The weight estimates are based around the relation between skeletal and total body mass of modern mammals. Notably, whales have much lighter skeletons compared to their total mass, whereas sirenians (dugongs and manatees) are similar to land mammals in having much denser skeletons that contribute more to their total weight. Bianucci and colleagues note the difficulties in determining the weight of basilosaurids. They suggest that the increase in skeletal mass could have been compensated for by larger amounts of blubber, which is less dense than other soft tissue. Ultimately, extreme values were used in the calculations, leading to the wide range for the weight estimate present in the type description. Basing the math on sirenians, a weight of 85 t (84 long tons; 94 short tons) was calculated. Combining the lowest skeletal-weight–to–total-weight ratio found in cetaceans with the highest estimated skeletal mass yields a weight of up to 340 t (330 long tons; 370 short tons). Mean values, on the other hand, result in a weight of 180 t (180 long tons; 200 short tons). This may indicate that, although not as long, the species could have been heavier than modern blue whales.

However, Motani and Pyenson in 2024 argued that it is extremely difficult for Perucetus to rival or exceed the blue whale in weight. They discussed that since Perucetus is much shorter than the blue whale in length, it should be at least 3.375 times denser or 1.83 times fatter to weigh heavier, which is impossible for vertebrates whose whole-body density range from 0.75 to 1.2. Motani and Pyenson tested the hypotheses of Bianucci and colleagues by performing various body mass estimation methods: the regression-based and volumetric mass estimation resulted in 60–114 t (59–112 long tons; 66–126 short tons) for a length range of 17–20 m (56–66 ft), though the likely body mass range would fall within 60–70 t (59–69 long tons; 66–77 short tons). They also claimed that the previous estimation is inflated by assumed isometry, and that the effect from pachyostosis on the estimation of body mass is not negligible as it resulted in underestimation.

Additionally, since Bianucci and colleagues did not test the accuracy of their estimation method using skeletal to body mass ratio, Motani and Pyenson calculated the mean absolute error for each body mass estimation methods of cetaceans. They further criticized that the accuracy of Bianucci and colleagues' scaling from a significantly smaller species (Cynthiacetus) is unwarranted, and that the feeding energetics and ocean productivity cannot support a 340 t (330 long tons; 370 short tons) animal to maintain homeostasis nor sustain itself metabolically. Overall, they concluded that the data and estimation methods are currently too limited, so more fossils like the cranial and dental material may be needed to test the estimates accurately.

In 2025, Paul and Larramendi suggested that the previous length estimation based on Cynthiacetus is unlikely, since Cynthiacetus probably had a significantly shorter trunk, so they revised the skeletal diagram and the body length estimation to 15–16 metres (49–52 ft). They also argued that the most likely body mass range would be 35–40 metric tons (39–44 short tons) based on volumetric modeling estimation, with estimates over 50 metric tons (55 short tons) being less likely. Although the authors proposed significantly smaller estimates, Perucetus is still heavier than the longer Basilosaurus, which likely measured around 18.35 metres (60.2 ft) long and weighed up to 15 metric tons (17 short tons), and thus the largest whale during the Eocene.

== Classification ==
Perucetus was identified as a member of the Pelagiceti based on the high number of lumbar vertebrae with circular centra and a highly reduced innominate bone. Within Pelagiceti, the well-defined acetabulum suggests closer affinities with basilosaurids (like Basilosaurus, Pachycetus, Cynthiacetus and Chrysocetus) and llanocetids (Mystacodon). Bianucci and colleagues subsequently added Perucetus to the family Basilosauridae.

== Paleobiology ==
The immense size and bone density both make it impossible for Perucetus to have gone on land, which is in line with its classification as a basilosaurid. The pachyosteosclerosis is taken as a sign that Perucetus lived in shallow waters, using it as buoyancy control as modern manatees do. Given its size and weight, Perucetus could have resisted crashing waves in more turbulent waters, something inferred for the similarly buoyant Steller's sea cow. The animal's affinity for shallow waters is congruent with the interpretation that basilosaurids preferred coastal waters, rather than living in the open ocean.

While the fragmentary nature of this animal renders precise statements on its locomotion uncertain, some suggestions have been made. The elongated centra of the vertebrae for instance may suggest that it, like manatees but not dugongs, swam with the use of axial undulation. This further indicates shallow waters rather than pelagic habitats for the animal. The great size of the vertebrae does impose limits on the swimming style of Perucetus, as does the shape of the transverse processes of the vertebrae. Using the methods of a previous study would suggest that Perucetus was limited in its ability to flex upward and from side to side but possessed an increased ability to flex downward (ventrally). This could suggest that Perucetus swam with slow up and down movements of its tail while not making use of any side to side movements as has been suggested for Basilosaurus. The strong ventral flexion in particular may have been of great importance for the animal when pushing itself off the ocean floor in order to breathe at the surface. The precise function of this combination of pachyosteosclerosis and gigantism is not fully understood, but may be linked to the energetic cost of undulating movements or the ability to dive for longer periods of time.

Life restoration.

The diet and feeding style remain even more mysterious, since no skull material of this animal is currently known. Still, some possibilities can be inferred based on the lifestyle deduced from the postcrania. While the many noted similarities to sirenians could be taken as a sign of a grazing lifestyle, this notion is deemed unlikely, as no other cetacean is known to have been herbivorous. It is deemed more likely that Perucetus fed on molluscs, crustaceans and other animals on the sea floor, either through suction feeding or filter feeding. Such a lifestyle would be comparable to that of the modern grey whale and beluga whale, both of which feed mainly on bottom-dwelling animals— by filter-feeding in the former and by suction in the latter. Another hypothesis mentioned by Bianucci et al. is that Perucetus could have been a scavenger like large demersal sharks. Ultimately, until better material is found, the precise ecology of Perucetus will remain unknown.

Motani and Pyenson argued that the possibility of Perucetus being a herbivore is unlikely, since there are no sirenians nor seagrasses reported in the Paleogene period of South America, and since it would make Perucetus as the only herbivorous whale among extinct and extant whales. They suggested that Perucetus would have likely been the top consumer as a benthic feeder, though theoretically it is also plausible to assume it as a benthic scavenger.

== See also ==
- Largest prehistoric animals
- Largest and heaviest animals
