= Melanella arenularia =

Scientific classification
- Kingdom: Animalia
- Phylum: Mollusca
- Class: Gastropoda
- Subclass: Caenogastropoda
- Order: Littorinimorpha
- Family: Eulimidae
- Genus: Melanella
- Species: †M. arenularia

Binomial name
- †Melanella arenularia (Gougerot, 1969)

Synonyms
- † Eulima arenularia Gougerot, 1969 superseded combination

Species of gastropod

Melanella arenularia is an extinct species of sea snail, a marine gastropod mollusk in the family Eulimidae.

== Distribution ==
Fossils of this species were found in Bartonian strata in Val d'Oise, France.
