= Bartoncetus =

Bartoncetus Temporal range: Eocene (Bartonian) 40.5–39.5 Ma

Scientific classification
- Kingdom: Animalia
- Phylum: Chordata
- Class: Mammalia
- Infraclass: Placentalia
- Order: Artiodactyla
- Infraorder: Cetacea
- Family: †Basilosauridae
- Subfamily: †Dorudontinae
- Genus: †Bartoncetus van Vliet et al., 2026

Type species
- Zeuglodon wanklyni Seeley, 1876

Synonyms
- Zygorhiza wanklyni (Seeley, 1876)

Fossil genus of cetacean

Bartoncetus is a genus of extinct archaeocete ceteceans belonging to the Basilosauridae that is known from the Middle Eocene of Europe.

== Taxonomy ==
In 1876, Harry Seeley described a skull found in the Wanklyn's Barton Cliff in the United Kingdom as a new species of Zeuglodon, Z. wanklyni. This specimen, however, went missing after its description, but Z. wanklyni was referred to as Zygorhiza wanklyni by Kellogg (1936) or to as a nomen dubium. In 2022, Gingerich and colleagues suggested that the lost skull possibly belongs to Pachycetus. Van Vliet et al. (2026) redescribed the taxon as a new genus of dorudontine basilosaurid, Bartoncetus, based on a postcranial specimen and Seeley's description of the holotype skull.
