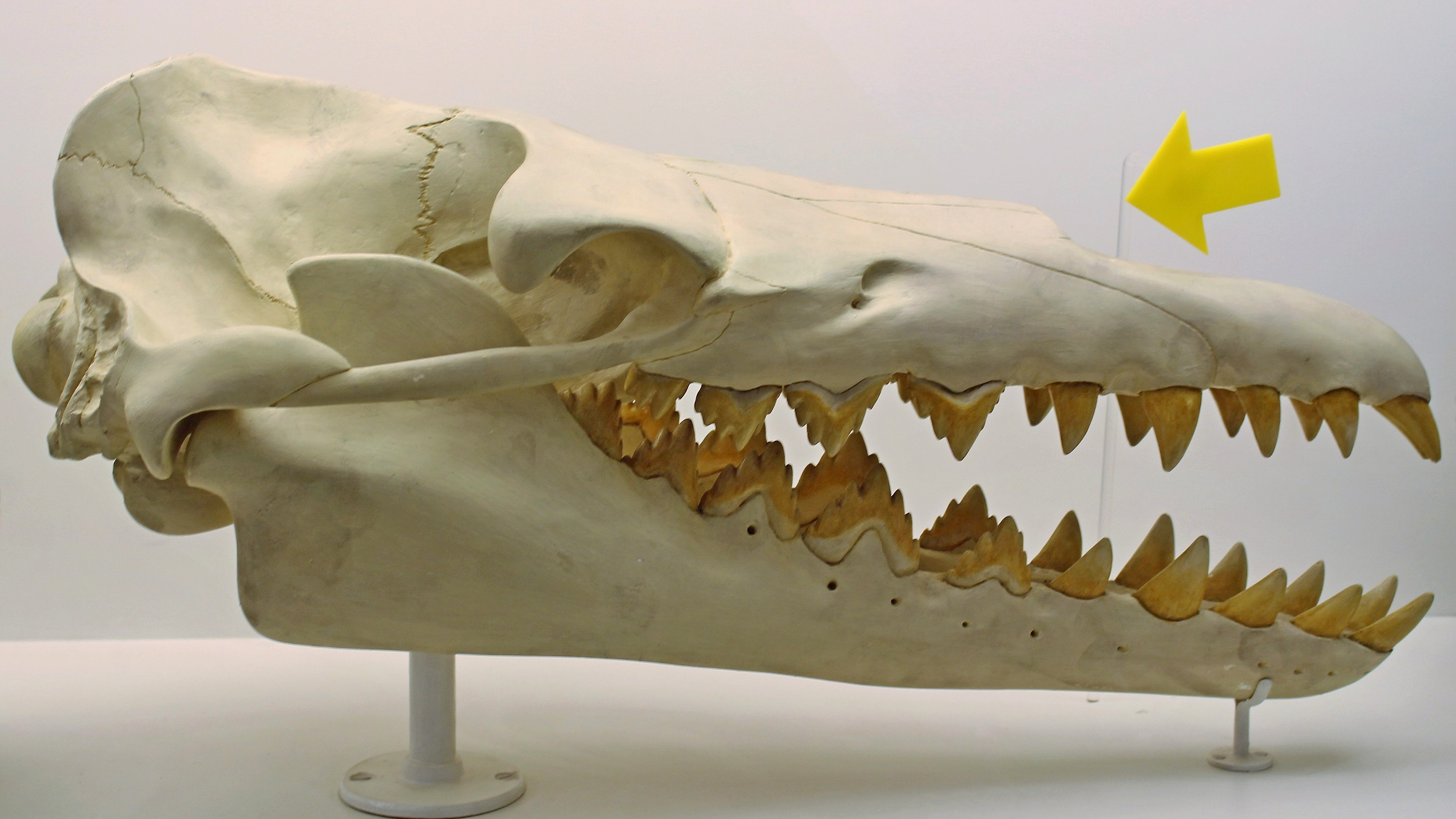
- Saghacetus skull. Arrow highlights the nasal openings halfway up the snout, an evolutionary step towards the telescoped condition in modern whales.

Scientific classification
- Kingdom: Animalia
- Phylum: Chordata
- Class: Mammalia
- Order: Artiodactyla
- Infraorder: Cetacea
- Family: †Basilosauridae; Cope 1868

Genera
- †Perucetus; †Tutcetus; †Eocetus?; †Basilosaurinae; †Dorudontinae; †Pachycetinae

= Basilosauridae =

Basilosauridae Temporal range: 46–33.9 Ma Lutetian to Priabonian

Family of mammals

Basilosauridae is a family of extinct cetaceans that lived during the middle to late Eocene. Basilosaurids are known from all continents including Antarctica, and are probably the first fully aquatic cetaceans. The group is noted to be a paraphyletic assemblage of stem group whales from which the monophyletic Neoceti are derived.

== Characteristics ==
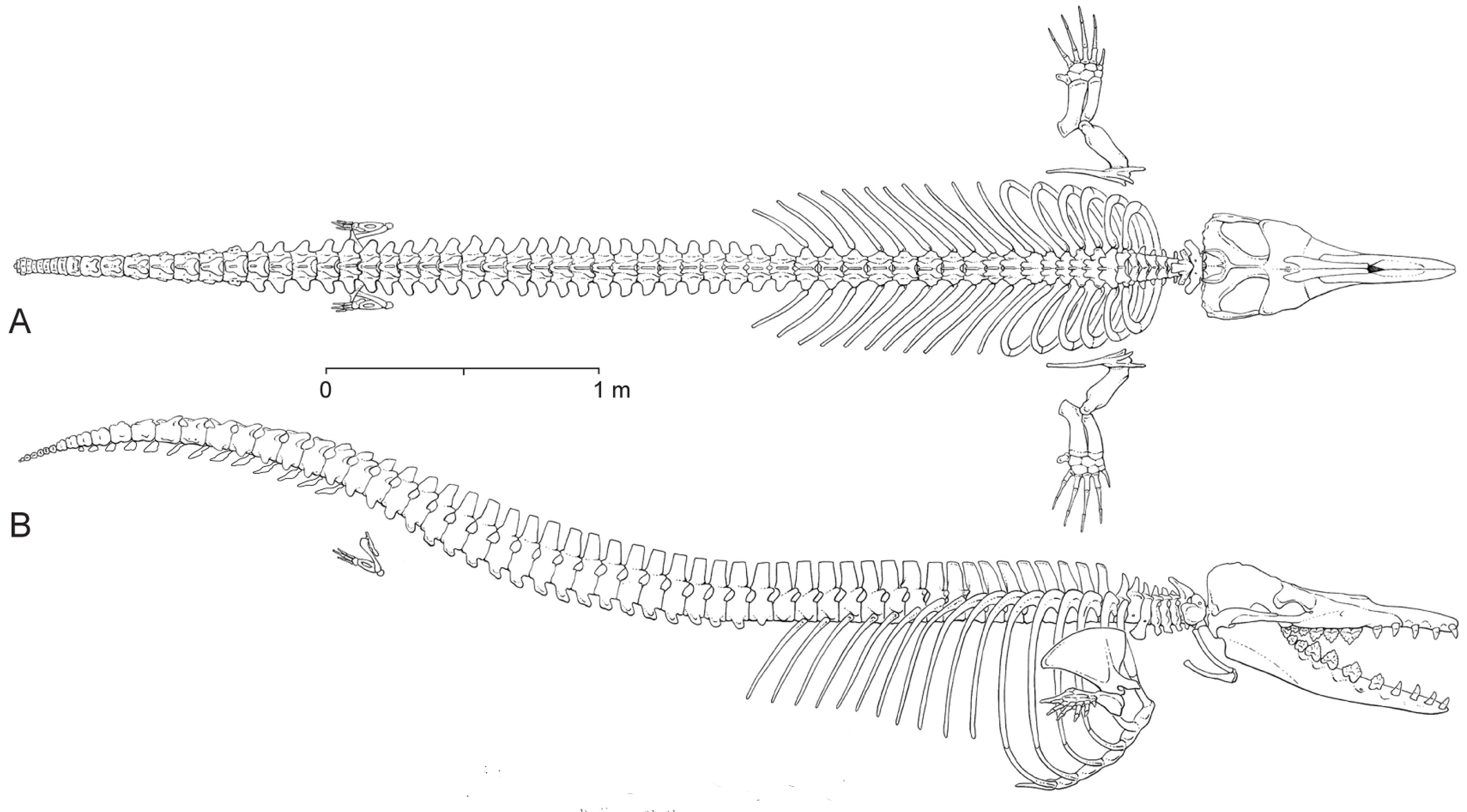
Dorudon skeletal diagram.

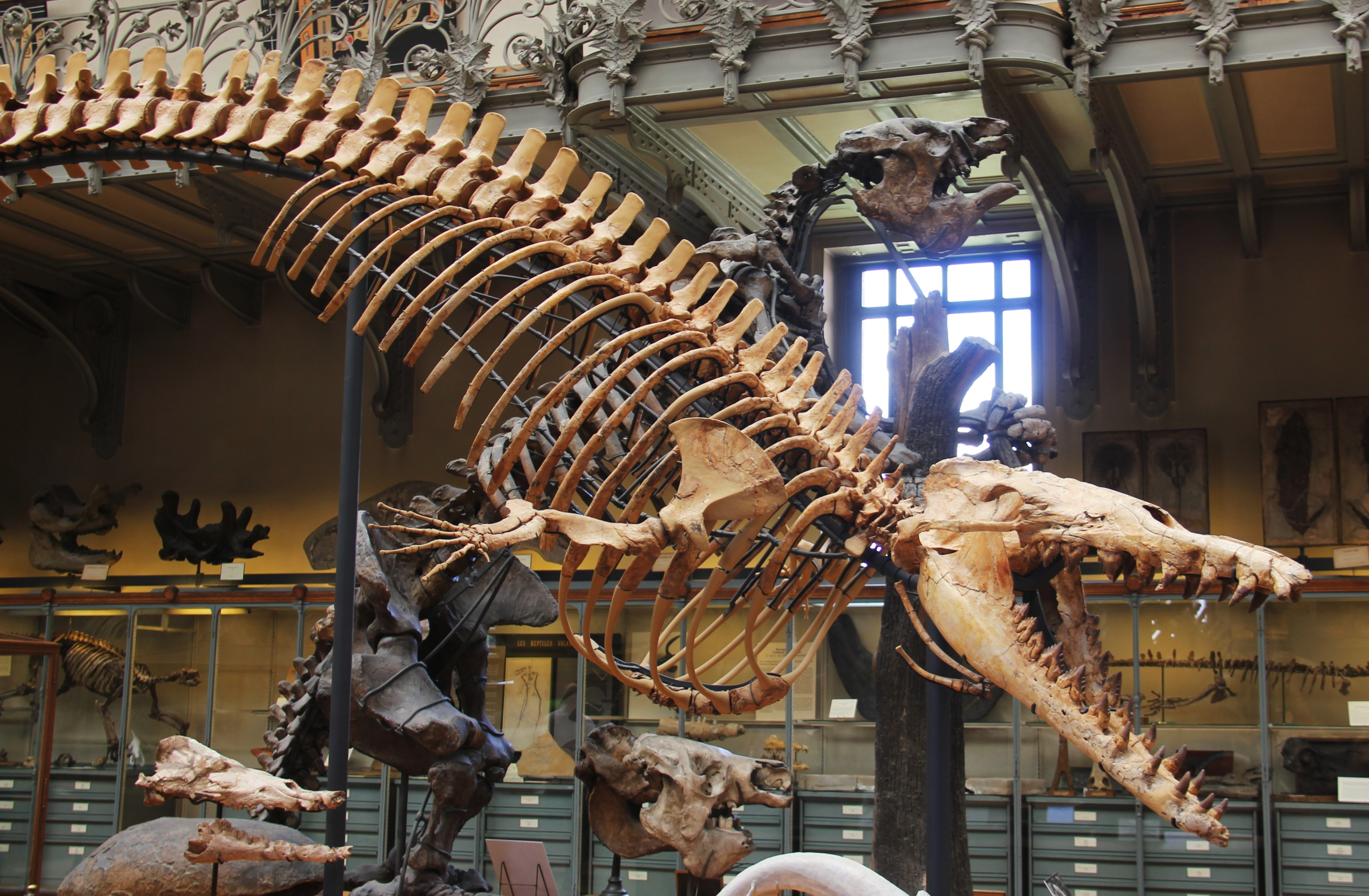
Cynthiacetus, mounted skeleton.

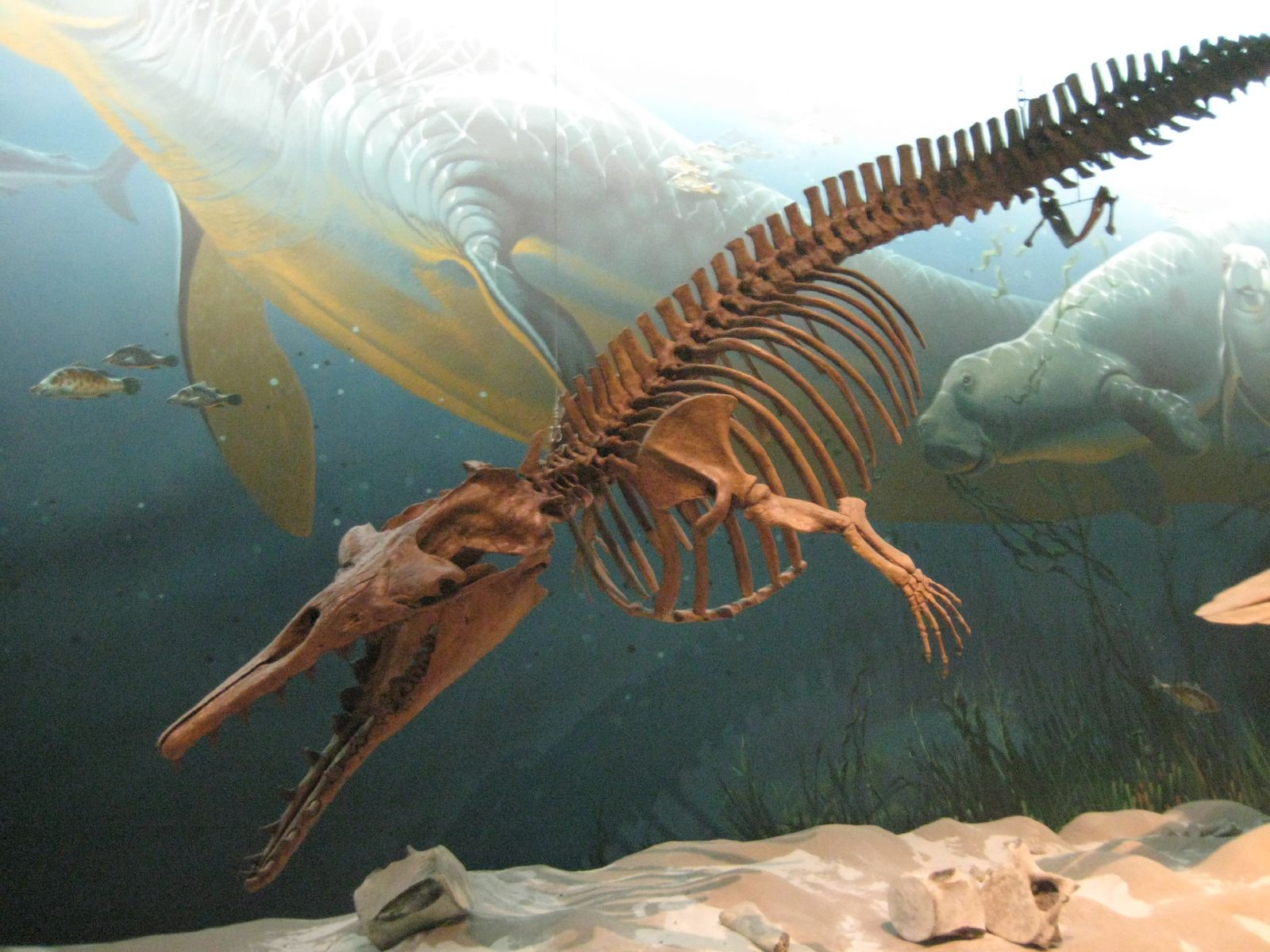
Zygorhiza, mounted skeleton.

Basilosaurids ranged in size from 4 to 16 m (13 to 52 ft) and were fairly similar to modern cetaceans in overall body form and function. Some genera tend to show signs of convergent evolution with mosasaurs by having long serpentine body shape, which suggests that this body plan seems to have been rather successful. Basilosaurid forelimbs have broad and fan-shaped scapulae attached to a humerus, radius, and ulna which are flattened into a plane to which the elbow joint was restricted, effectively making pronation and supination impossible. Because of a shortage of forelimb fossils from other archaeocetes, it is not known if this arrangement is unique to basilosaurids, as some of the characteristics are also seen in Georgiacetus.

As archaeocetes, basilosaurids lacked the telescoping skull of present whales. Their jaws were powerful, with a dentition easily distinguishable from that of other archaeocetes: they lack upper third molars and the upper molars lack protocones, trigon basins, and lingual third roots. The cheek teeth have well-developed accessory denticles.

Unlike modern whales, basilosaurids possessed small hindlimbs with well defined femur, lower leg and feet. They were, however, very small and did not articulate with the vertebral column, which also lack true sacral vertebrae. While they were unable to support body weight on land, they might have assisted as claspers during copulation. Analysis of tail vertebrate from Basilosaurus and Dorudon indicate they possessed small flukes.

== Systematics and Classification ==
In the past, basilosaurids were predominantly separated into two groups based on absolute body size and the presence of extreme elongation within the vertebral series. Basilosaurinae was proposed as a subfamily containing two genera: Basilosaurus and Basiloterus. Alongside Basilosaurinae, Dorudontinae was proposed as a subfamily of smaller sized whales that included Dorudon and all other basilosaurids that didn't possess the extreme vertebral elongation seen in Basilosaurus and Basiloterus.

Although Basilosauridae is historically recovered as a monophyletic group sister to Neoceti, more recent studies have shown that Basilosauridae may instead represent a paraphyletic grade that gave rise to modern whales. The inner systematics of Basilosauridae as a whole are also under revision. Recent analyses have shown that large body size and vertebral elongation are traits that can evolve convergently among these whales, making these traits poor indicators of their true relationships. As of the description of Tutcetus, all fully aquatic whales fall into a larger clade known as Pelagiceti, of which the poorly known cetacean Eocetus is the basalmost member. From there, there are three major clades that are recovered. One clade contains the diminutive basilosaurids Tutcetus, Chrysocetus, and Ocucajea. Another contains Basilosaurus and several taxa typically regarded as dorudontines, such as Dorudon, Zygorhiza, and the large Cynthiacetus. The final clade contains a monophyletic Pachycetinae sister to Neoceti, with Supayacetus as the most basal member of the Pachycetinae clade. The results of this analysis are shown below.

- Pelagiceti
  - Eocetus
  - - - - Chrysocetus
        - - Ocucajea
          - Tutcetus rayanensis
      - - Zygorhiza
        - - - Saghacetus
            - Ancalecetus
          - - Basilosaurus
            - - Dorudon
              - Pontogeneus peruvianus
    - - - Supayacetus
        - - Pachycetus paulsonii
          - - Pachycetus wardii
            - Antaecetus aithai
      - Neoceti

Certain enigmatic cetaceans from the Middle and Late Eocene may belong to Pelagiceti or the basilosaurid grade, but they are too fragmentary to have their relationships resolved. The poorly understood cetacean Eocetus is known from a heavily damaged skull and a handful of vertebrae, and the incomplete, poorly preserved nature of these remains have hindered efforts to find a definitive placement for the genus. Historically, it is regarded as a highly derived member of Protocetidae, but recent analyses have included it within Basilosauridae or Pelagiceti as a basal member. The highly fragmentary "Platyosphys einori" from the Middle Eocene of Ukraine may also fall within Pelagiceti, but its known anatomy is very unique compared to other basilosaurids. The bones are from a juvenile animal, which was about 10 meters long at time of death. Not only is this size impressive for an Eocene whale, especially for a juvenile, but what is more remarkable is that it possessed osteoporotic ribs. Osteoporotic skeletal elements are a trait that is unknown in all other archaeocete whales, and only seen in the members of Neoceti. It is currently classified as Basilosauridae incertae sedis, but like Eocetus, it may represent a transitional form at the base of Pelagiceti, between the most advanced protocetids and the other members of the basilosaurid grade.

== Size ==
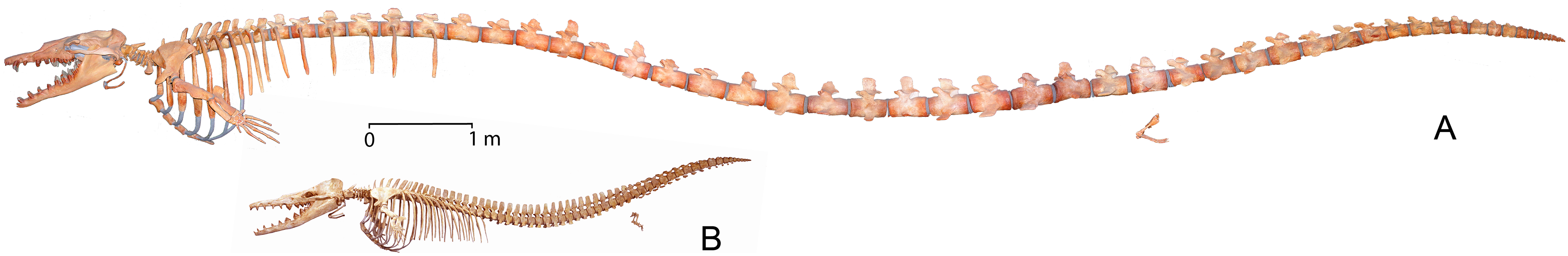
Basilosaurus isis (A) compared to Dorudon atrox (B).

Basilosaurids have a diverse range of sizes. Tutcetus rayanensis, the smallest member, is about 2.51–2.55 meters (8 feet 3 inches – 8 feet 4 inches) long and weighs around 180.4–187.1 kilograms (398–412 pounds). On the other hand, Basilosaurus cetoides is impressively long, reaching approximately 18 meters. The largest known basilosaurid, Perucetus colossus, is believed to be even bigger, with a length of about 17–20 metres (56–66 ft) and possibly comparable to, if not larger than, the modern blue whale in terms of weight, though other researchers argue that it was much lighter.

== Taxonomy ==
- Family Basilosauridae
  - Genus Perucetus
  - Genus Tutcetus
  - Genus Eocetus?
  - Subfamily Basilosaurinae
    - Genus Basilosaurus
    - Genus Basiloterus
  - Subfamily Dorudontinae
    - Genus Ancalecetus
    - Genus Bartoncetus
    - Genus Chrysocetus
    - Genus Cynthiacetus
    - Genus Dorudon
    - Genus Masracetus
    - Genus Ocucajea
    - Genus Saghacetus
    - Genus Stromerius
    - Genus Supayacetus
    - Genus Zygorhiza
  - Subfamily Pachycetinae
    - Genus Pachycetus
    - Genus Antaecetus

== See also ==
- Evolution of cetaceans
- Leviathan
