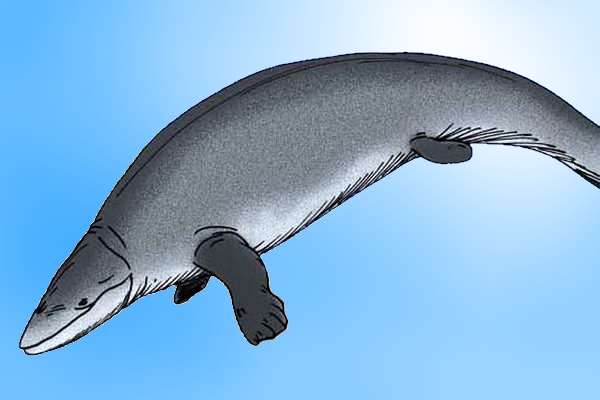

Scientific classification
- Kingdom: Animalia
- Phylum: Chordata
- Class: Mammalia
- Order: Artiodactyla
- Infraorder: Cetacea
- Family: †Basilosauridae
- Genus: †Ocucajea; Uhen et al. 2011
- Species: †O. picklingi

Binomial name
- †Ocucajea picklingi Uhen et al. 2011

= Ocucajea =

Ocucajea Temporal range: Middle Eocene (Divisaderan), 40.4–37.2 Ma

Species of mammal (fossil)

Ocucajea is an extinct genus of basilosaurid cetacean from Middle Eocene (Bartonian stage) deposits of southern Peru. Ocucajea is known from the holotype MUSM 1442, a partial skeleton. It was collected in the Archaeocete Valley site, from the Paracas Formation of the Pisco Basin about 40.4 to 37.2 million years ago.

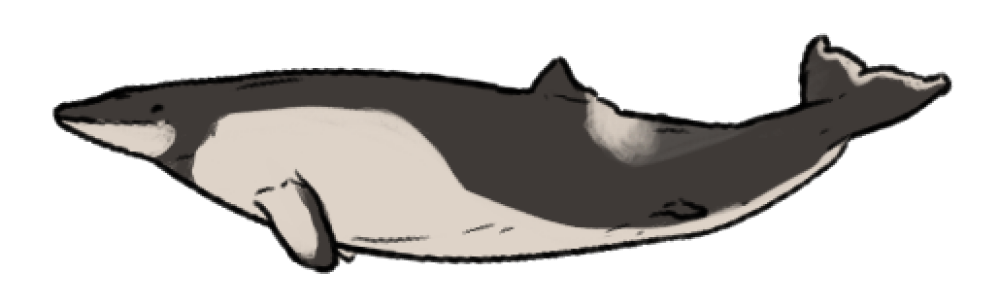
Life restoration

The genus was named after the town Ocucaje in the Ica Province near the type locality, and the species after José Luis Pickling Zolezzi, naturalist, artist, and a vital contributor to Peruvian palaeontology.

Ocucajea is smaller than all other dorudontines. It differs from Saghacetus and Dorudon in cranial morphology; in Ocucajea the nasals extends further posteriorly than the maxillae, and there is no narial process of the frontal like in Saghacetus.
