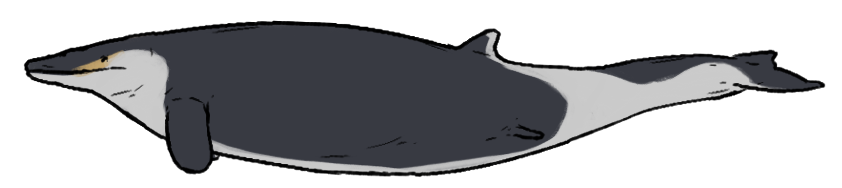
- Life restoration

Scientific classification
- Domain: Eukaryota
- Kingdom: Animalia
- Phylum: Chordata
- Class: Mammalia
- Order: Artiodactyla
- Suborder: Whippomorpha
- Infraorder: Cetacea
- Family: †Basilosauridae
- Genus: †Ancalecetus; Gingerich & Uhen 1996
- Species: †A. simonsi

Binomial name
- †Ancalecetus simonsi Gingerich & Uhen 1996

= Ancalecetus =

Ancalecetus Temporal range: 37.2–33.9 Ma

Extinct protocetid early whale

Ancalecetus (from Greek ankale, "bent arm", and ketos, "whale") is an extinct genus of early whale known from the Late Eocene (Priabonian, 37.2 to 33.9 million years ago) Birket Qarun Formation (29.3°N 30.0°E, paleocoordinates 24.6°N 26.2°E) in Wadi Al-Hitan, Egypt. The species is named after anthropologist and primate researcher Elwyn L. Simons who discovered the type specimen in 1985.

The holotype is a partial cranium (the top of the skull was destroyed by erosion), both dentaries, 20 vertebrae and some sternal elements, partial ribs, and most of both forelimbs. Ancalecetus differs from other archaeocetes and modern whales in having narrow scapulae, very limited mobility in the shoulder joint, and fusion of the humerus, ulna, and radius at the elbow joint. In the wrist, the carpal bones are small like in Zygorhiza, but, unlike in this other basilosaurid, the magnum is fused with the trapezoid in Ancalecetus.

== Forelimbs ==
The well-preserved forelimbs are the most distinctive parts of A. simonsi. A broad scapula and a ball-and-socket shoulder joint is characteristic of cetaceans, but Ancalecetus lacks both.

The interior surface of the narrow scapula is not broadly curved as in most cetaceans, but tightly curved. The roughened vertebral border suggests the presence of a cartilaginous extension that extends the surface of the scapula like in modern cetaceans. Compared to other cetaceans, the infraspinous fossa is smaller, the caudal border is less curved and not oriented posteriorly. The glenoid cavity is very shallow and directed posteriorly, rather than ventrally like in other cetaceans. Likewise, the oddly folded acromion is pointing ventrally and posteriorly, and not anteriorly as in other cetaceans.

Unlike in other basilosaurids, the humerus of Ancalecetus is flattened and has a relatively small head. The distal end has flat, textured surfaces for the articulation of the radius and ulna; these bones are fused on the left limb and tightly fitting and the right side, and neither permitted motion at the elbow joint.

== Dentition ==
Most of the upper dentition has been eroded away, but the dental formula of Ancalecetus most likely was 3.1.4.33.1.4.2. Tooth wear show that Ancalecetus, like other basilosaurids, fed on larger prey, probably fish, that required mastication before swallowing and that the type specimen survived into adulthood.

The unfused mandibular symphysis reaches as far posteriorly as P_{2}. The large mandibular foramina, which contain the auditory fat pad in modern whales, is very well preserved in Ancalecetus.
