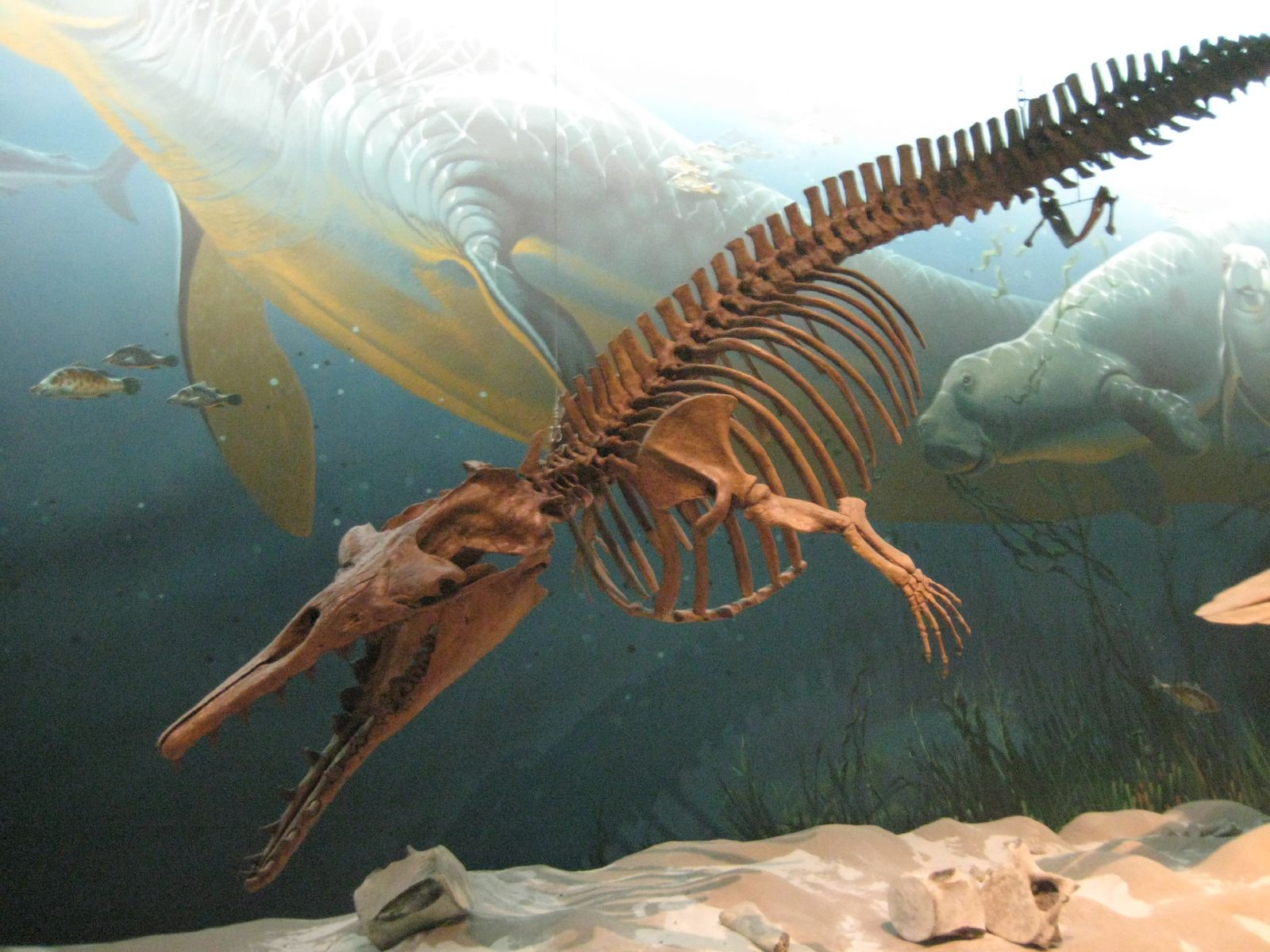
- Zygorhiza kochii skeleton, Smithsonian National Museum of Natural History

Scientific classification
- Kingdom: Animalia
- Phylum: Chordata
- Class: Mammalia
- Infraclass: Placentalia
- Order: Artiodactyla
- Infraorder: Cetacea
- Family: †Basilosauridae
- Subfamily: †Dorudontinae
- Genus: †Zygorhiza; True 1908
- Species: †Z. kochii

Binomial name
- †Zygorhiza kochii (Reichenbach in Carus, 1847)

= Zygorhiza =

Zygorhiza Temporal range: 43–33.9 Ma

Genus of mammals

Zygorhiza ("Yoke-Root") is an extinct genus of basilosaurid early whale known from the Late Eocene (Priabonian, 38–34 Ma) of Louisiana, Alabama, and Mississippi, United States, and the Bartonian (43–37 Ma on the New Zealand geologic time scale) to the late Eocene of New Zealand (43 to 33.9 million years ago). Specimens reported from Europe are considered Dorudontinae incertae sedis.

Zygorhiza kochii, along with Basilosaurus under the designation "prehistoric whales", is the state fossil of Mississippi.

== Taxonomic history ==
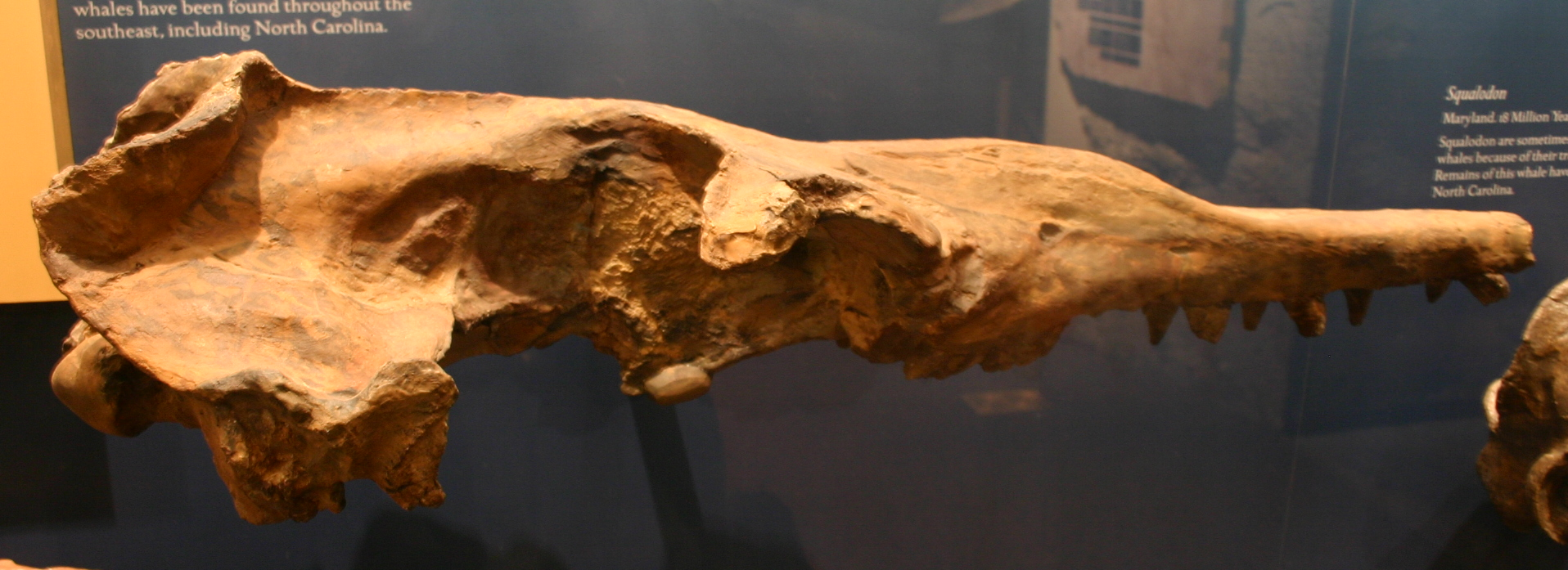
Zygorhiza kochii skull at the North Carolina Museum of Natural Sciences

Reichenbach (1847) erected Basilosaurus kochii for the posterior skull fragment MB Ma.43248, found in the Late Eocene (middle-late Priabonian) Ocala Limestone of Clarksville, Louisiana. Meanwhile, Muller (1851) erected a new subspecies of Zeuglodon brachyspondylus, Z. brachyspondylus minor, for not only MB Ma.43248 but also MB Ma.43247, TM 8501 (holotype of Zeuglodon hydrarchus Carus, 1849), and several vertebrae. In the late 19th century there was a debate whether large and small specimens attributed to Zeuglodon brachyspondylus (declared a nomen dubium by Uhen 2005) were separate species or not. Hoping to clarify things, Stromer 1903 restricted Z. brachyspondylus to the large fossils (including the Z. brachyspondylus lectotype) and created the subspecies Z. brachyspondylus minor for the small specimens which had previously been synonymized with Dorudon serratus. True 1908 proposed the genus Zygorhiza for the subspecies. Adopting True's generic name, Kellogg 1936 synonymized this subspecies with Basilosaurus kochii to form the new combination Zygorhiza kochii.

Köhler & Fordyce 1997 described an incomplete skull, four vertebrae, two teeth, and small fragments in early Bartonian sediments in New Zealand which they tentatively identified as Zygorhiza sp. This is the oldest known Dorudontinae and the oldest known cetacean from the Southern Hemisphere.

In the U.S., Zygorhiza is known from the Gulf Coast, whilst Dorudon is known from southeastern Atlantic Coast. Outside North America, Zygorhiza has only been reliably identified in New Zealand, whereas Dorudon only in Egypt. It is possible that these non-overlapping distributions indicate differences in habitat preferences. The mounted specimen in the Macon Museum of Arts and Sciences in Macon is commonly referred to as "Ziggy".

=== Formerly assigned material ===
Seeley 1876 named and described the species Zeuglodon wanklyni based on a skull collected by Dr. Arthur Wanklyn from the Barton Clays in southern England. This skull, however, was never deposited at the British Museum of Natural History and has not been since Seeley described it. Kellogg 1936, nevertheless, recombined it as Zygorhiza wanklyni and referred a posterior cervical vertebra from the same location to it. Uhen 1998 declared it nomen dubium. In 2022, Gingerich and colleagues suggested that the lost skull possibly belongs to Pachycetus. In 2026, van Vliet and colleagues redescribed the taxon as a new genus of dorudontine basilosaurid, Bartoncetus, based on a postcranial specimen and Seeley's description of the holotype skull.

== Anatomy ==
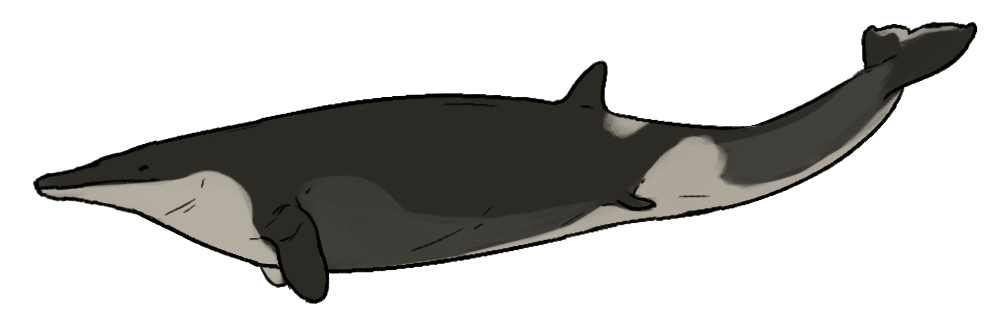
Restoration

Like other dorundontines, Zygorhiza had a body similar to modern cetaceans with flipper-like forelimbs, rudimentary hind limbs, a vertebral column adapted for oscillatory swimming, and a tail fluke.

Marino et al. 2000 estimated the adult body mass for Zygorhiza to 3,351 kg (7,388 lb) based on an estimated body length of 5.2 metres (17 ft). Using CT scans, they estimated the brain weight to 738.2 g (26.04 oz), resulting in an EQ value of 0.26 (compared to 0.54 for a modern cetacean such as Cuvier's beaked whale.)

=== Dentition ===
The permanent dental formula for Zygorhiza is 3.1.4.33.1.4.3, the deciduous dental formula is 3.1.43.1.4. The cingula at the base of the tooth crowns on P^{2–4} are strongly developed but do not meet on the medial side. P^{2}, the largest upper tooth, has four accessory denticles on the anterior and posterior cutting edges. P^{3}–M^{2} form a closed series. P^{2}–M^{2} have two widely separated roots, accessory denticles on the anterior and posterior cutting edges, and anastomosing striae on the enamel. P_{1} is caniniform with a single root. P_{2–4} have laterally compressed crowns and accessory denticles on the anterior and posterior cutting edges. P_{4} is the largest lower tooth. M_{1–3} have accessory denticles on the posterior cutting edges. P_{2–3} are two-rooted. Outside the upper one-rooted teeth and inside the upper two-rooted teeth there are pits for reception of the lower teeth.

Zygorhiza (and Dorudon) replaced their upper and lower deciduous first premolars with permanent teeth. This is very unusual in modern mammals and contrasts to extant toothed whales that only develop a single set of teeth. It might indicate that Zygorhiza represents a stage in archaeocete evolution where skeletal maturation was delayed like in modern cetaceans. Zygorhiza differs from all other dorudontines in the presence of well-developed cuspules on the cingula of the upper premolars.

=== Skeleton ===
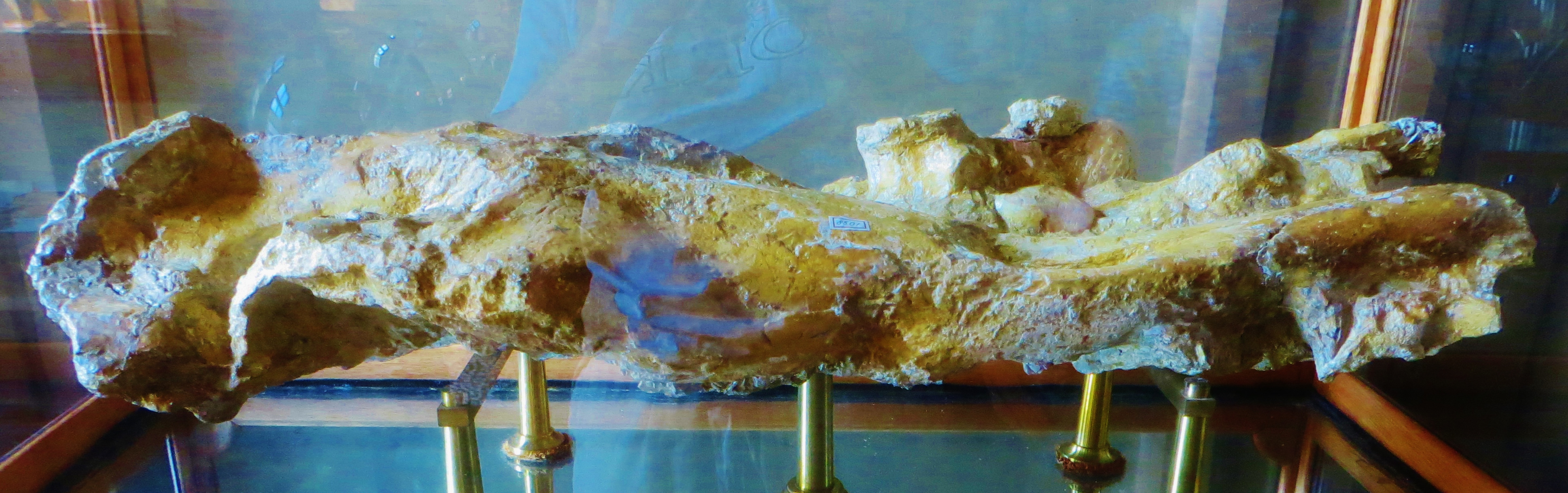
Fossil in Teylers Museum, Haarlem

The skull is elongated with a narrow rostrum and a flattened forehead; the premaxillae are laterally convex. The high sagittal crest is flanked by two large temporal fossae, resulting in a narrow intertemporal region.

The hyoid apparatus consists of a small, central, and hexagonal basihyoid bone. From this bone project a pair of thyrohyoid bones (homologous with the greater cornua in humans) that are slightly expanded anteriorly and tapper off posteriorly, and another pair of slender and elongated bones, the epihyoid and stylohyoid bones.

The elbow is a hinge joint without rotary movements and the forelimbs are relatively short. The humeri of Zygorhiza and Chrysocetus are more gracile than those of Dorudon.

The vertebral formula is 7 cervicals, 15 thoracics, probably 13 lumbars, 2 sacrals, and at least 21 caudals. The centra of the posterior thoracic, lumbar, sacral, and anterior caudal are slightly elongated. The centra of the cervicals are compressed and the flexibility in the neck is limited by the interlocked lateral processes. The atlas has a hypapophysial (ventral) process; the axis, a small odontoid (tooth-like) process, short and narrow transverse processes, and an elongated neural spine.
