= Bartonian =

Third Age of the Eocene Epoch

- 41.03 – 37.71 Ma
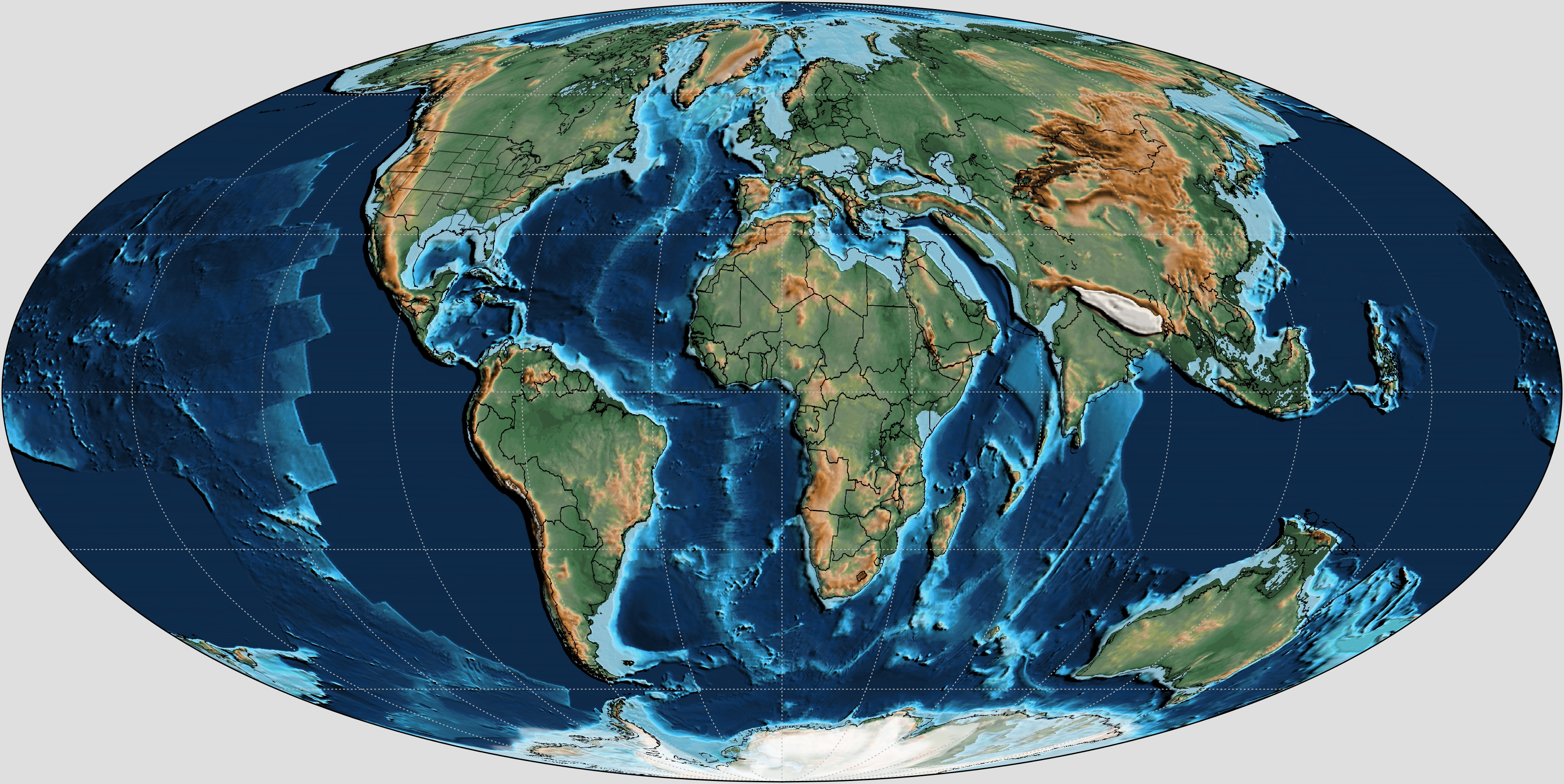
- Map of Earth as it was 40 million years ago, with black outlines of present-day countries

Chronology
| ← / PETM; ← / First Antarctic permanent ice-sheets; ← / K-Pg mass extinction |
Subdivision of the Paleogene according to the ICS, as of 2024. Vertical axis scale: Millions of years ago
- Formerly part of: Tertiary Period/System

Etymology
- Name formality: Formal

Usage information
- Celestial body: Earth
- Regional usage: Global (ICS)
- Time scale(s) used: ICS Time Scale

Definition
- Chronological unit: Age
- Stratigraphic unit: Stage
- Time span formality: Formal
- Lower boundary definition: Not formally defined
- Lower boundary definition candidates: Calcareous nannofossil near LAD of the Haptophyte Reticulofenestra reticulata
- Lower boundary GSSP candidate section(s): Contessa highway section, Gubbio, Central Apennines, Italy
- Upper boundary definition: LAD of the large acarininids and the Foraminiferan Morozovelloides crassatus
- Upper boundary GSSP: Alano section, Piave river, Venetian Prealps, Belluno, Italy; 45.9141°N 11.9180°E
- Upper GSSP ratified: February 2020

The Bartonian is, in the International Commission on Stratigraphy's (ICS) geologic time scale, a stage or age in the middle of the Eocene Epoch or Series. The Bartonian Age spans the time between 41.03 and 37.71 Ma. It is preceded by the Lutetian and is followed by the Priabonian Age.

== Stratigraphic definition ==
The Bartonian Stage was introduced by Swiss stratigrapher Karl Mayer-Eymar in 1857. The name derives from the Barton Group, a lithostratigraphic unit from the south English Hampshire Basin, which in turn derived its name from the local coastal village Barton-on-Sea (part of New Milton) in southern England. The distinction between group and stage was made in the second part of the 20th century, when stratigraphers saw the need to distinguish between litho- and chronostratigraphy.

The base of the Bartonian is at the first appearance of the calcareous nanoplankton species Reticulofenestra reticulata. In 2009, an official reference profile (GSSP) for the base of the Bartonian had not yet been established.

The top of the Bartonian Stage (the base of the Priabonian) is at the first appearance of calcareous nanoplankton species Chiasmolithus oamaruensis (which forms the base of nanoplankton biozone NP18).

The Bartonian Stage overlaps part of the upper Robiacian European Land Mammal Mega Zone (it spans the Mammal Paleogene zone 16), the upper Uintan and Duchesnean North American Land Mammal Ages, part of the Divisaderan South American Land Mammal Age and is coeval with the Sharamururian Asian Land Mammal Age.

The Auversian regional stage of France is coeval with the Bartonian and is therefore no longer used.
