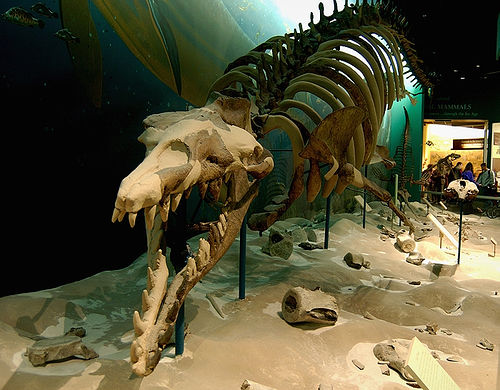
- Basilosaurus skeleton

Scientific classification
- Kingdom: Animalia
- Phylum: Chordata
- Class: Mammalia
- Infraclass: Placentalia
- Order: Artiodactyla
- Infraorder: Cetacea
- Family: †Basilosauridae
- Subfamily: †Basilosaurinae; Miller, 1923

Genera
- Basilosaurus; Basiloterus

= Basilosaurinae =

Basilosaurinae Temporal range: 41–33.9 Ma Middle Eocene – Late Eocene

Subfamily of mammals

Basilosaurinae is a subfamily of cetaceans archaeocetes containing two genera: Basilosaurus and Basiloterus. They were characterized by elongated distal thoracic vertebrae, lumbar, and proximal sacrococcygeal. All known members of the subfamily are larger than their relatives of the Dorudontinae subfamily except Cynthiacetus.

== Classification ==
- Subfamily Basilosaurinae
  - Genus Basilosaurus
    - Basilosaurus cetoides
    - Basilosaurus isis
  - Genus Basiloterus
    - Basiloterus hussaini
