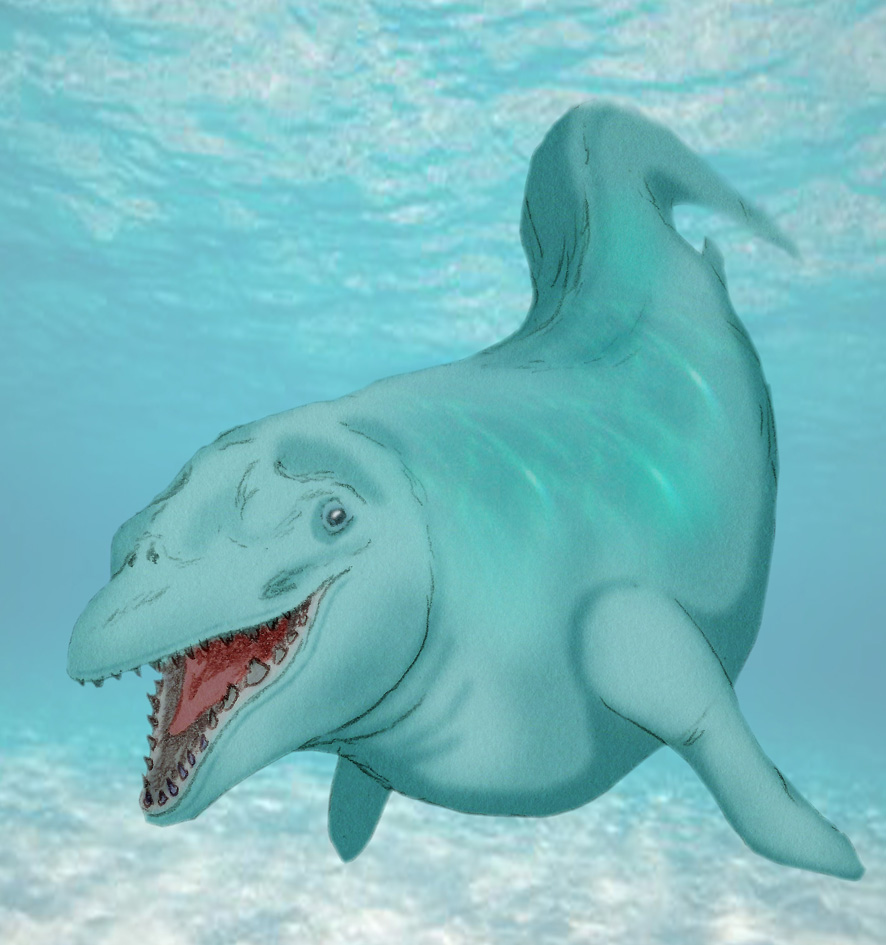
- Restoration

Scientific classification
- Kingdom: Animalia
- Phylum: Chordata
- Class: Mammalia
- Order: Artiodactyla
- Infraorder: Cetacea
- Family: †Basilosauridae
- Subfamily: †Dorudontinae
- Genus: †Masracetus; Gingerich 2007

Species
- M. markgrafi (type) Gingerich 2007

= Masracetus =

Masracetus Temporal range: 37.2–33.9 Ma

Genus of mammals

Masracetus (from Arabic Masr, "Egypt", and Greek ketos, "whale") is an extinct genus of basilosaurid ancient whale known from the Late Eocene (Priabonian, 37.2 to 33.9 million years ago) of Egypt.

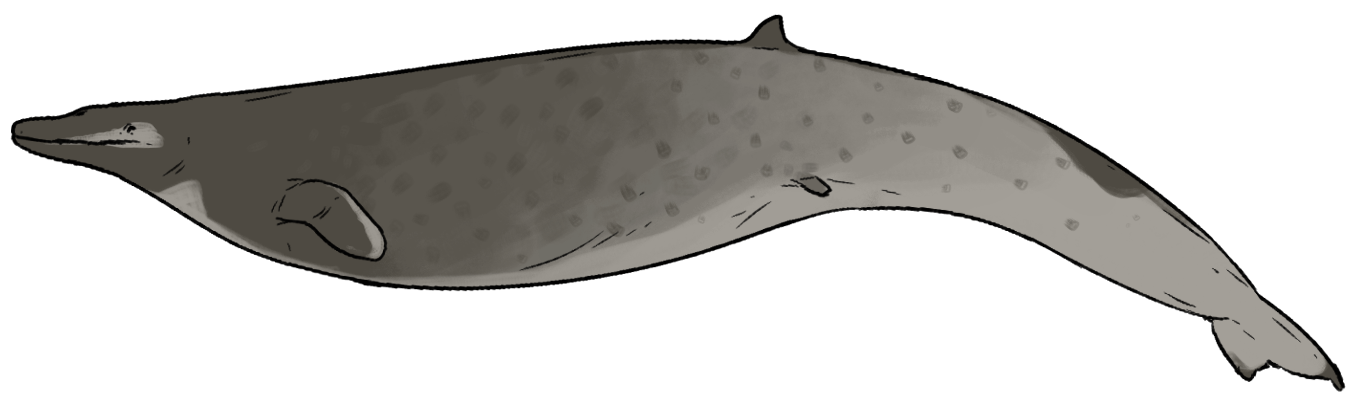
Life restoration

Masracetus was briefly described in an addendum by Gingerich 2007 and is known from just an assemblage of vertebrae and a poorly reconstructed skull from 1908. The lumbar vertebrae are large but relatively short (anteroposteriorly) compared to those of other archaeocetes; the diameter is almost the same as for Basilosaurus isis but the length is less than half of the latter. Masracetus is larger than Cynthiacetus, but it is suggested that the former might be synonymized as a junior synonym with the latter.

The species name honours Richard Markgraf, palaeontologist Ernst Stromer's fossil collector, who collected the type specimen in 1905.

Masracetus' type locality is the Birket Qarun Formation in Dimê (29.5°N 30.7°E, paleocoordinates 24.9°N 26.6°E) north of lake Birket Qarun, but specimens have also been found in the Qattara Depression and Fayum.
