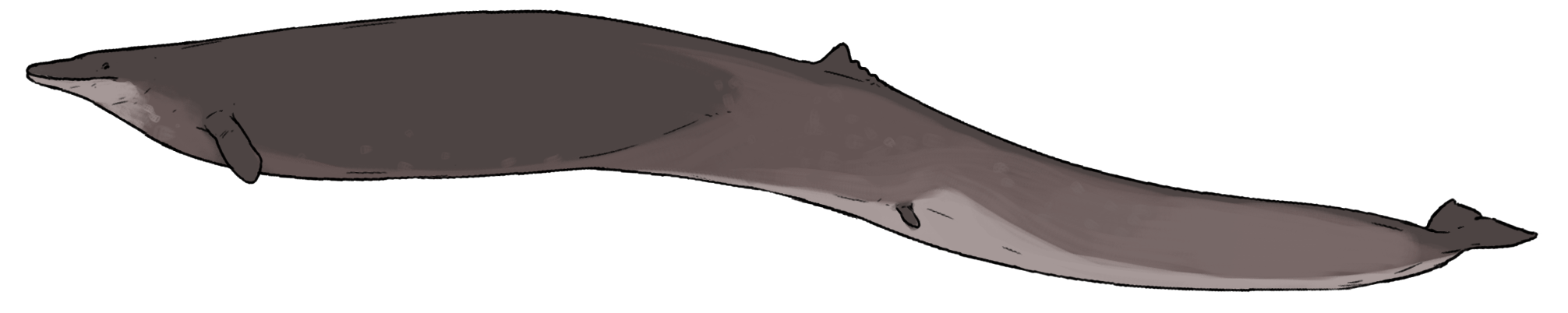

Scientific classification
- Kingdom: Animalia
- Phylum: Chordata
- Class: Mammalia
- Infraclass: Placentalia
- Order: Artiodactyla
- Infraorder: Cetacea
- Family: †Basilosauridae
- Genus: †Basiloterus; Gingerich et al., 1997
- Species: †B. hussaini

Binomial name
- †Basiloterus hussaini Gingerich et al., 1997

= Basiloterus =

Basiloterus Temporal range: Bartonian ~40.4–40 Ma

Extinct protocetid early whale

Basiloterus is an extinct genus of late-Eocene archaeocete whale from the Drazinda Formation in southwestern Punjab, Pakistan and possibly also the Barton Group (originally Barton Beds) of England. Known from two isolated lumbar vertebrae, the elongated nature of these elements has been taken as possible evidence that Basiloterus was a close relative of the better-known Basilosaurus. This was also the reasoning behind its name, which roughly translates to "another king". However, publications since then not only lead to some major changes of the internal relationships within Basilosauridae but have also called into question how diagnostic elongated vertebrae are for members of this group, as other early whales have developed similar anatomy independently. Though the identity of Basiloterus as a basilosaurid is generally maintained, its exact position within more recent interpretations of the family is unclear. Only a single species is assigned to this genus, Basiloterus hussaini.

== History and naming ==
The fossil remains of Basiloterus were discovered in 1996 in the green shales that compose the middle parts of the Drazinda Formation in Pakistan. The genus was described in 1997 by Gingerich et al. alongside the species Basilosaurus drazindai on the basis of two lumbar vertebrae thought to represent a single individual. Gingerich and colleagues tentatively refer a vertebral centrum from the Barton Group of England to this genus as well on the basis of its age, size and general morphology.

The scientific name derives from the Ancient Greek "basileus" and "heteros" or "oteros", in combination translating to "other king" or "another king". The name was explained as being chosen as a companion name to Basilosaurus, whose name translates to "king reptile". The species name of Basiloterus husseini honors Dr. S. Taseer Hussain, a researcher who warked at the Howard University in Washington, D.C. and sponsored the first expedition to the Drazinda Formation.

== Description ==
Basiloterus differs from species of Basilosaurus in that the centra of the lumbar vertebrae were less elongated relative to their height compared to those of Basilosaurus. The crosssections of the vertebrae are more circular than in Pachycetus, but the front and back surfaces are still not perfectly round. Instead, the anterior epiphyseal surface, the part of the centrum that faces the vertebra before it, is described as mildly saddle-shaped, whereas the surface that faces backwards is more oval and flattened. The actual epiphysis are, however, missing in both specimens. The preserved parts of the vertebrae measure 18.5 cm (7.3 in) in length, accounting for the missing epiphysis this means would suggest that the vertebrae measured up to 20 cm (7.9 in) long if complete. The vertebrae narrow towards the middle from all sides, giving them a dumbbell shape as described by Gol'din and Zvonok, which sets them apart from those of Basilotritus. The lower surface of the vertebrae is concave and does not feature a keel, instead displaying three vascular foramina that are located within the concavity.

The transverse processes, which project from the sides of the centrum, are described as being oriented anteroventrally. This downturned state is thought to allow for an increased arc of movement of the iliocostalis muscle. The transverse processes are less elongated than those of Basilotritus.

The laminae at the base of the neural spine is thin and leads into the spinous process while also enclosing the moderately large neural canal in junction with the pedicles. The pedicles connect to the laminae at an angle and are described as being situated closer to the front of the vertebra, something considered to be typical for basilosaurids by Gingerich. The metapophysis, which are robust pyramidal structures that project from the pedicles, are described as being oriented much more vertically than those of Basilosaurus. They extend beyond the front-most edge of the centrum, but do not flare out much. The spinous process extends to a height of 17.5 cm (6.9 in) above the vertebral centrum, all the while being directed at a 10-degree angle forward. The base of the neural spine is 12 cm (4.7 in) long from the front to the back but is only 1.3 cm (0.51 in) thick. The anterior to posterior length of the neural spine is another feature that differentiates Basiloterus from Basilotritus, as this element is less elongated. The tip of the spinous process does not expand, suggesting only weak ligaments and muscle attachments.

According to Gingerich and colleagues, Basiloterus was smaller than Basilosaurus, and Gol'din & Zvonok state that the vertebrae are of similar size to those of Basilotritus. The size of the vertebrae has also been compared to Pachycetus robustus, with Gingerich determining that those of Basiloterus were around 25% larger.

== Phylogeny ==
Gingerich and colleagues considered Basiloterus to be a close relative of Basilosaurus based on the size and shape of the lumbar vertebrae as well as the fact that the two genera were contemporary. Later, Mark D. Uhen argued that this first identification may not be as certain as initially believed. Although Uhen agrees that elongated vertebrae are a distinguishing feature of basilosaurines within the family Basilosauridae, he also points out that other groups evolved this trait independently. According to Uhen, this means that Basiloterus and Basilosaurus drazindai could also be protocetids similar to Eocetus, which also developed elongated vertebrae. While few papers examined or even acknowledge Basiloterus following the type description, those that do feature it continue to regard it as a basilosaurid.

The phylogenetic tree provided by Uhen in 2009's Encyclopedia of Marine Mammals suggests a paraphyletic Basilosauridae leading up to modern cetaceans, although some more recent studies have proposed monophyletic solutions for Basilosauridae as well. Despite his reservations towards the identity of Basiloterus as a basilosaurine, the tree still depicts it as the immediate sister taxon to Basilosaurus as proposed by Gingerich and colleagues.

- - †Pakicetidae
  - - †Ambulocetidae
    - - †Remingtonocetidae
      - - †Protocetidae
        - Basilosauridae
          - Basilosaurinae
            - †Cynthiacetus
            - - †Basiloterus
              - †Basilosaurus
          - Dorudontinae
            - - †Dorudon
              - †Ancalecetus
            - - †Zygorhiza
              - - †Saghacetus
                - - †Chrysocetus
                  - - Mysticeti
                    - Odontoceti

The elongation of the vertebrae as a convergent trait is again noted by Gol'din and Zvonok, who propose that it had been independently gained by Basiloterus, Basilotritus and Basilosaurus. They argue that this independent acquisition of elongated lumbars renders it an unreliable character to separate the subfamilies Basilosaurinae and Dorudontinae, further supported by the close relationship they recover between Basilosaurus and Dorudon. In their results, Dorudon is the closest relative of Basilosaurus in place of Basiloterus, which is not included in their results. Similar results also appear in later papers such as the description of the small-bodied basilosaurid Tutcetus, which also argues against the concept of a distinct Basilosaurinae and Dorudontinae and does not discuss Basiloterus. The description of Cynthiacetus peruvianus also fails to recover two distinct subfamilies and simply refers to Basiloterus as a basilosaurid of uncertain relation to the other taxa within the family.

== Paleobiology ==
Although not found in the same area, Basiloterus likely coexisted with Basilosaurus drazindai as they both come from the same green shales of the Drazinda Formation, which also yielded the remains of the giant softshell turtle Drazinderetes. The Drazinda Formation consists of shallow marine sediments.

== See also ==
- Evolution of cetaceans
