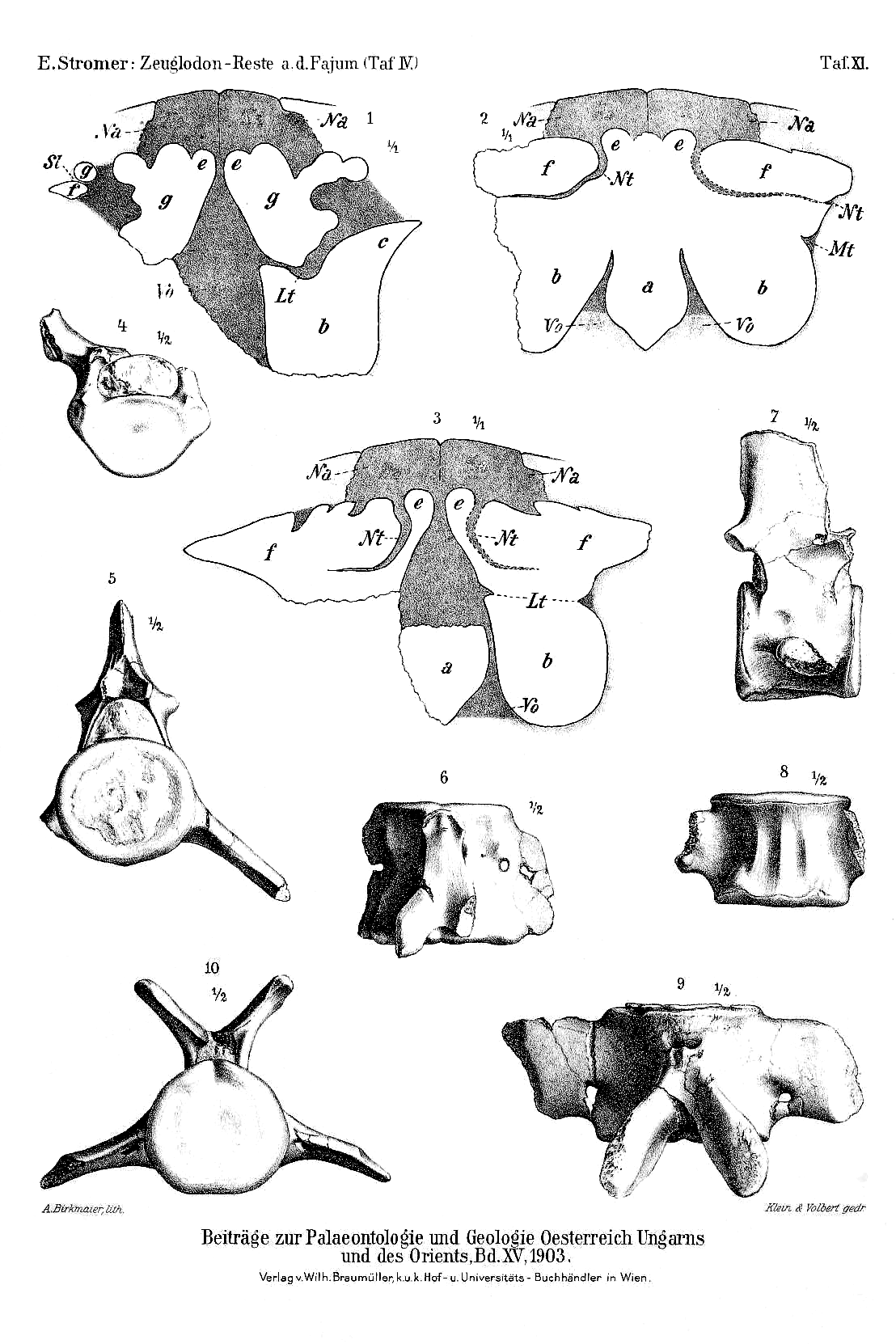
- Stromerius vertebrae

Scientific classification
- Domain: Eukaryota
- Kingdom: Animalia
- Phylum: Chordata
- Class: Mammalia
- Order: Artiodactyla
- Suborder: Whippomorpha
- Infraorder: Cetacea
- Family: †Basilosauridae
- Subfamily: †Dorudontinae
- Genus: †Stromerius; Gingerich 2007

Species
- S. nidensis (type) Gingerich 2007

= Stromerius =

Stromerius Temporal range: Late Eocene, 37.2–33.9 Ma

Genus of mammals

Stromerius is an extinct genus of basilosaurid early whale known from the Late Eocene (Priabonian, 37.2 to 33.9 million years ago) of Fayum, Egypt (29.6°N 30.6°E, paleocoordinates 24.9°N 26.5°E).

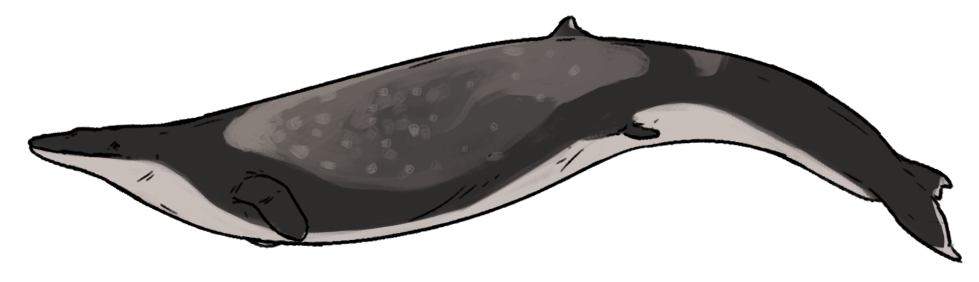
Life restoration

Stromerius is known from several well-preserved vertebrae. Distinguishing features for the genus include: long and forward-pointing metapophyses (bony processes) on the lumbar vertebrae; a relatively short lumbar spine with only twelve vertebrae of which four are interpreted as homologous to sacral vertebrae; one of the two thoracic vertebrae found has a dorsally-pointing neural spine interpreted as anticlinal (i.e. the spines of the other vertebrae are inclined towards this specific vertebra) which is a primitive retention in Stromerius not present in other basilosaurids. Stromerius is larger than the contemporary Saghacetus but smaller than the older Dorudon.

Gingerich 2007 made S. nidensis the type species of the subfamily "Stromeriinae", but only mentioned this proposed subfamily briefly in his abstract.

The genus is named for German palaeontologist Ernst Stromer von Reichenbach who made a ground-breaking work in the recovery of whale fossils in Egypt. The species' name comes from Latin nidus, "nest", after the Arabic name of the type locality Garet el Esh, "hill of the nest".

They are two specimens: Stromer 1903 described and illustrated BSPM 1902.XI.504-510, seven vertebrae, and Gingerich 2007 described UM 100140, 19 complete or partial vertebrae.
