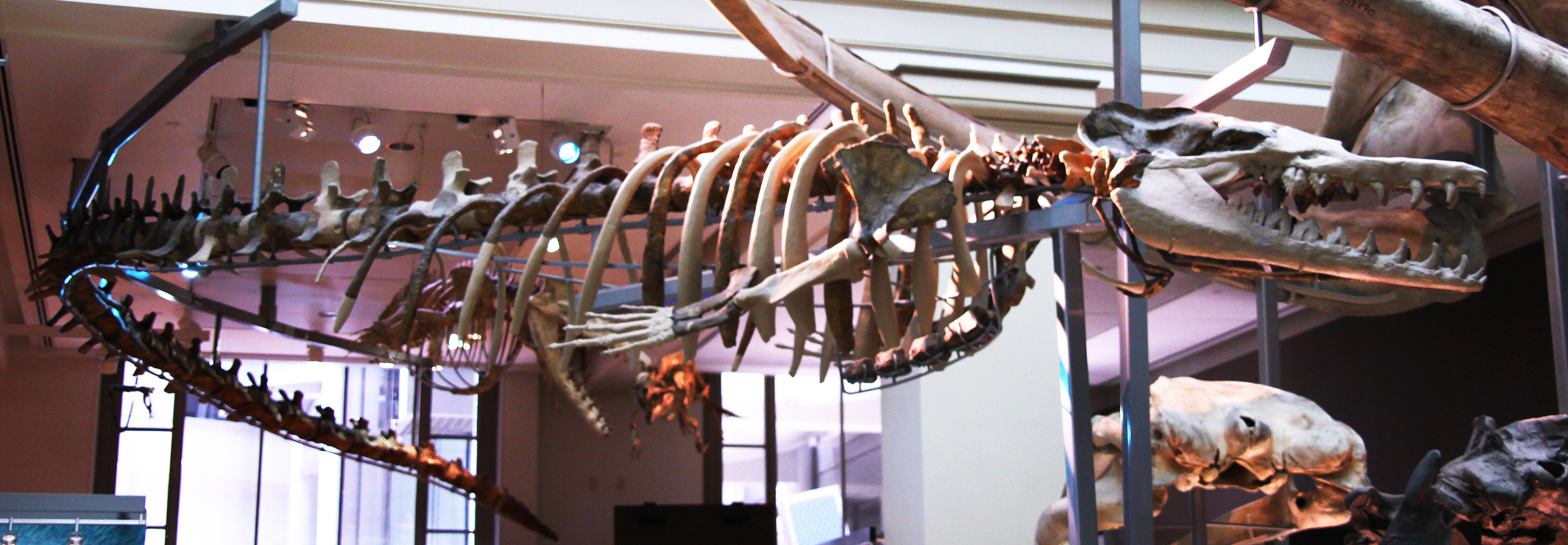
- B. cetoides skeleton, National Museum of Natural History, Washington, D.C.

Scientific classification
- Kingdom: Animalia
- Phylum: Chordata
- Class: Mammalia
- Order: Artiodactyla
- Infraorder: Cetacea
- Family: †Basilosauridae
- Subfamily: †Basilosaurinae
- Genus: †Basilosaurus; Harlan 1834

Type species
- †Basilosaurus cetoides Owen 1839

Species
- †B. cetoides Owen 1839; †B. isis Andrews 1904

Synonyms
- Zeuglodon Owen 1839; Hydrarchos? Koch 1845; Alabamornis Abel 1906

= Basilosaurus =

Basilosaurus Temporal range: Eocene (Bartonian to Priabonian), 41.3–33.9 Ma

Prehistoric cetacean genus from the Late Eocene epoch

Basilosaurus (meaning "king lizard") is a genus of large, predatory, prehistoric archaeocete whale from the late Eocene, approximately 41.3 to 33.9 million years ago (mya). First described in 1834, it was the first archaeocete and prehistoric whale known to science. Fossils attributed to the type species B. cetoides were discovered in the southeastern United States. The generic name, meaning "king lizard", was given due to the initial misconception about the fossil material as that of a giant reptile. The animal was later found to be an early marine mammal, prompting attempts at renaming the creature, which failed as the rules of zoological nomenclature dictate using the original name given. The second species named in 1904, B. isis, lived in the region currently known as the Mediterranean Sea, with fossils found in North Africa and Jordan.

Basilosaurus is thought to have been one of the largest animals of the Paleogene, with the type species B. cetoides measuring around 17–20 m (56–66 ft) long and weighing up to 15 metric tons (17 short tons). It was the top predator of its environment in the shallows of the inland sea, preying on sharks, large fish and other marine mammals. The smaller dolphin-like relative Dorudon seems to have been the predominant food source of Basilosaurus based on its stomach contents and the bite marks preserved in the skull of Dorudon.

Basilosaurus was at one point a wastebasket taxon before the genus slowly started being reevaluated, with many species of different Eocene cetacean being assigned to the genus in the past. However, most are invalid or have been reclassified under a new or different genus, leaving only two confirmed species. Basilosaurus may have been one of the first fully aquatic cetaceans, sometimes referred to as the Pelagiceti. Basilosaurus, unlike modern cetaceans, had various types of teeth–such as canines and molars–in its mouth (heterodonty), and it probably was able to chew its food, in contrast to modern cetaceans which swallow their food whole.

== Taxonomic history ==
=== Etymology ===
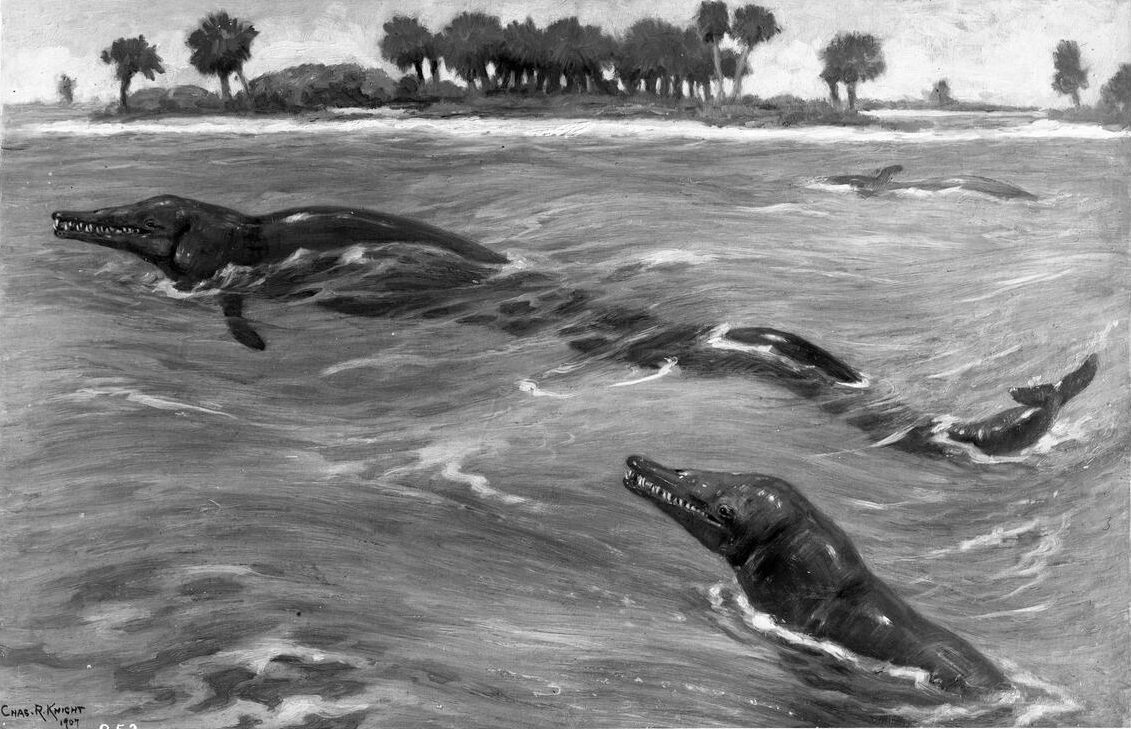
Outdated restoration of Basilosaurus by Charles R. Knight from 1907 showing a serpent-like body-plan

The two species of Basilosaurus are B. cetoides, whose remains were discovered in the United States, and B. isis, which was discovered in Egypt. B. cetoides is the type species for the genus. The holotype of B. cetoides was found in Ouachita Parish, Louisiana. The exact formation is said to be the Yazoo Clay/formation. Vertebrae were sent to the American Philosophical Society by a Judge Henry Bry of Ouachita Parish, Louisiana and Judge John Creagh of Clarke County, Alabama. Both fossils ended up in the hands of the anatomist Richard Harlan, who requested more examples from Creagh. The first bones were unearthed when rain caused a hillside full of sea shells to slide. The bones were lying in a curved line "measuring upwards of four hundred feet [120 m] in length, with intervals which were vacant." Many of these bones were used as andirons and destroyed; Bry saved the bones he could find, but was convinced more bones were still to be found on the location. Bry speculated that the bones must have belonged to a "sea monster" and supplied "a piece having the appearance of a tooth" to help determine which kind.

Harlan identified the tooth as a wedge-shaped shell and instead focused on "a vertebra of enormous dimensions" which he assumed belonged to the order "Enalio-Sauri of Conybeare", "found only in the sub-cretaceous series". He noted that some parts of the vertebra were similar to those of Plesiosaurus and skull was similar to Mosasaurus, but that they were completely different in proportions. Comparing his vertebra to those of large dinosaurs such as Megalosaurus and Iguanodon, Harlan concluded that his specimen was considerably larger (he estimated the animal "could not have been less than from eighty to one hundred feet [24 to 30 m] long") and therefore suggested the name Basilosaurus, meaning "king lizard".

Harlan brought his assembled specimens (including fragments of jaw and teeth, humerus, and rib fragments) to the UK where he presented them to anatomist Richard Owen. Owen concluded that the molar teeth were two-rooted, a dental morphology unknown in fishes and reptiles, and more complex and varied than in any known reptile, and therefore that the specimen must be a mammal. Owen correctly associated the teeth with cetaceans, but he thought it was an herbivorous animal, similar to sirenians. Consequently, Owen proposed renaming the find Zeuglodon cetoides ("whale-like yoke teeth" in reference to the double-rooted teeth) and Harlan agreed.

=== Wadi El Hitan ===
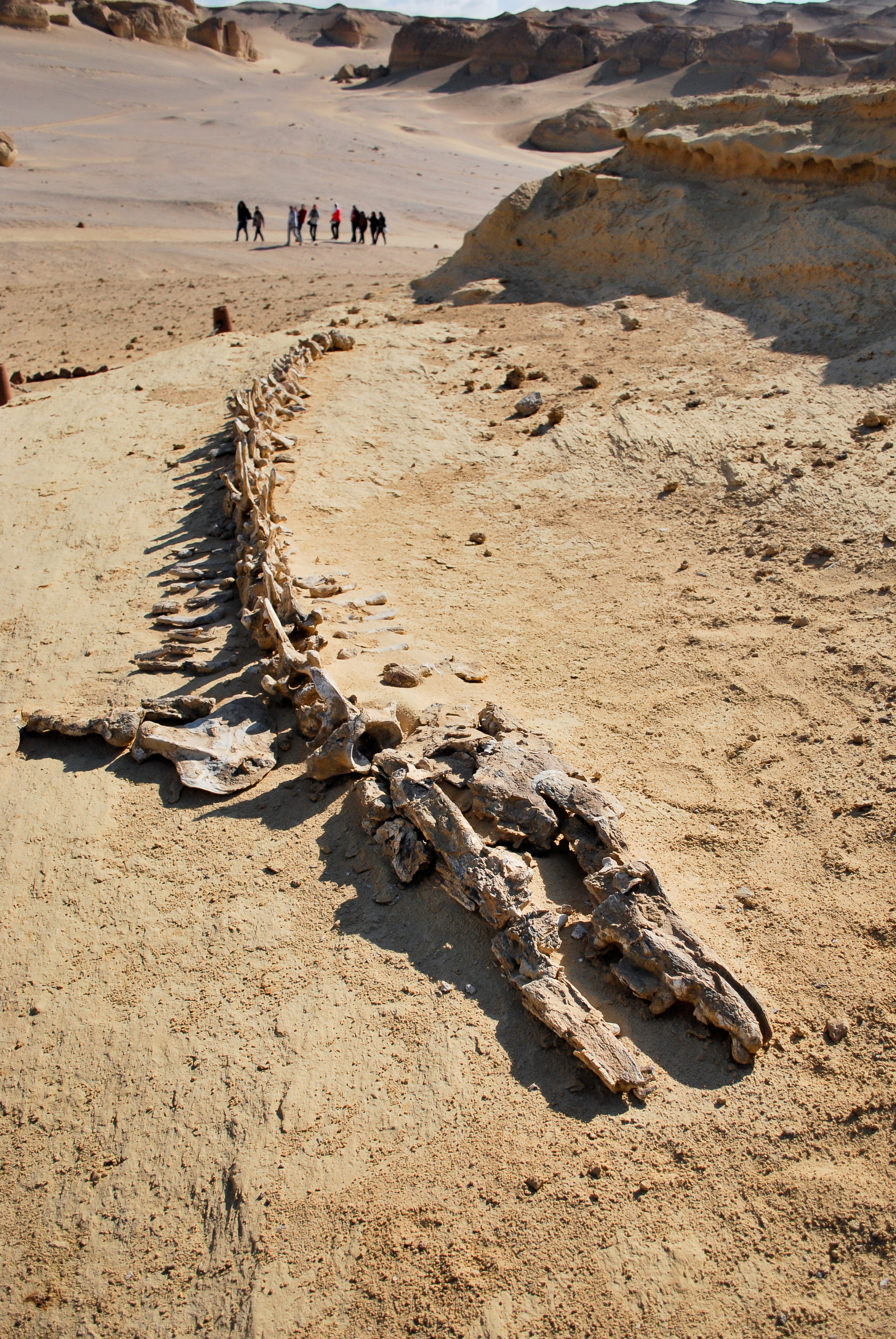
Skeleton of B. isis at Wadi El Hitan

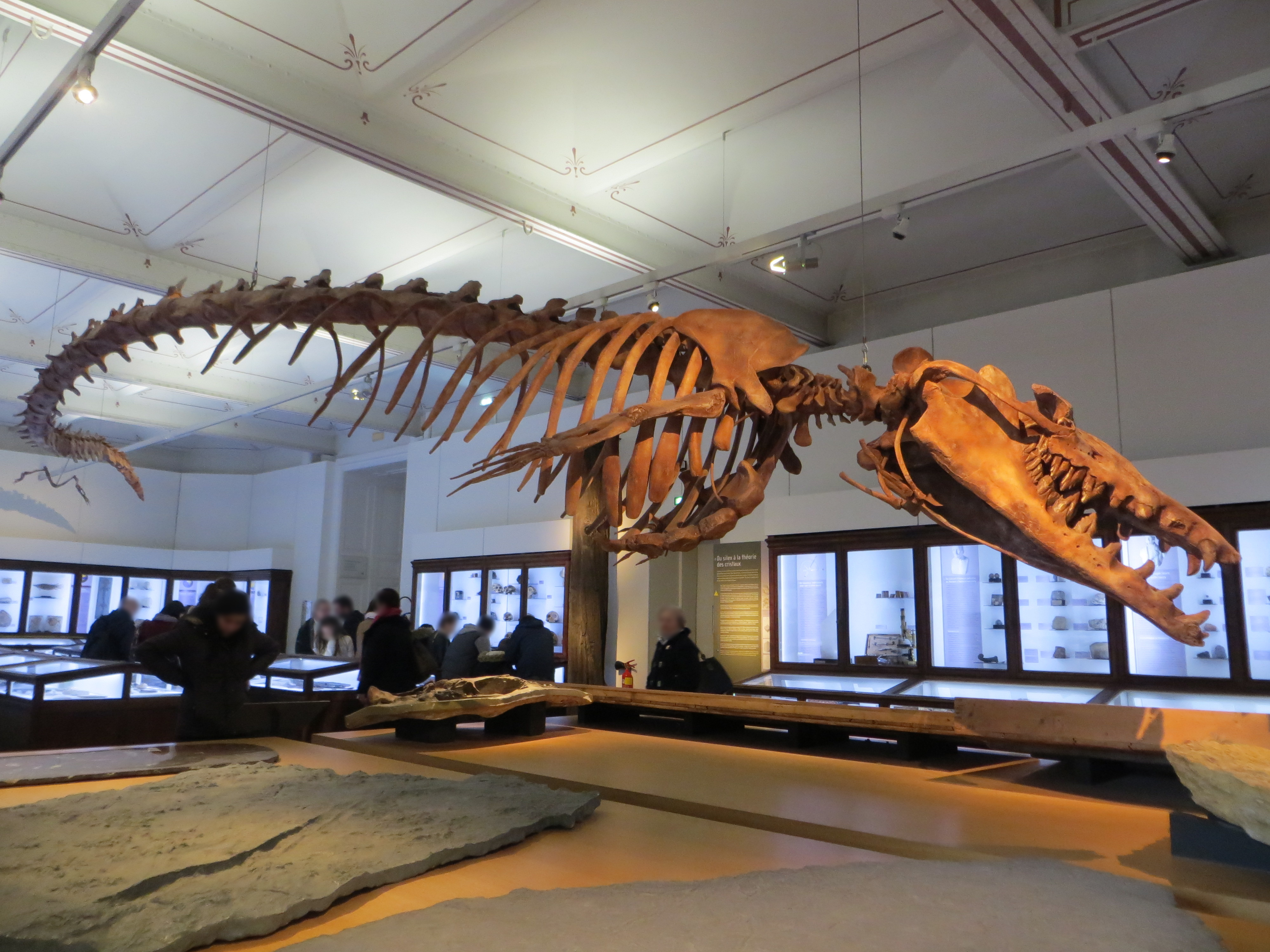
Basilosaurus isis fossil, Nantes History Museum in France

Wādī al-Ḥītān (Arabic: وادي الحيتان, lit. 'Valley of the Whales') is an Egyptian sandstone formation where many early-whale skeletons were discovered. German botanist Georg August Schweinfurth discovered the first archaeocete whale in Egypt (Zeuglodon osiris, now Saghacetus osiris) in 1879. He visited the Qasr el Sagha Formation in 1884 and 1886 and missed the now famous Wadi El Hitan by a few kilometers. German paleontologist Wilhelm Barnim Dames described the material, including the type specimen of Z. osiris, a well-preserved dentary.

Hugh Beadnell, head of the Geological Survey of Egypt 1896–1906, named and described Zeuglodon isis in Andrews 1904 based on a partial mandible and several vertebrae from Wadi El Hitan in Egypt. Andrews 1906 described a skull and some vertebrae of a smaller archaeocete and named it Prozeuglodon atrox, now known today as Dorudon atrox. Kellogg 1936 discovered deciduous teeth in this skull and it was then believed to be a juvenile [Pro]zeuglodon isis for decades before more complete fossils of mature Dorudon were discovered.

In the 1980s, Elwyn L. Simons and Philip D. Gingerich started to excavate at Qasr el-Sagha and Wadi El Hitan with the hope of finding material that could match archaeocete fossils from Pakistan. Since then, over 500 archaeocete skeletons have been found at these two locations, of which most are B. isis or D. atrox, several of the latter carrying bite marks assumed to be from the former. A 1990 paper described additional fossils including foot bones and speculated that the reduced hind limbs were used as copulatory guides. One thing that was noted, was that whale fossils were so common, that when a mason company looked at their newest table counter, they realized that they had created a cross section of a 40 million year old basilosaurid fossil. This find was another thing that caught the eye of Gingerich.

In 2015, a complete skeleton, the first-ever such find for Basilosaurus, was uncovered in Wadi El Hitan, preserved with the remains of its prey, including a Dorudon and several species of fish. The whale's skeleton also shows signs of scavenging by large sharks such as the otodontid Otodus sokolovi, though the study considered it possible that this shark was also part of the diet of Basilosaurus.

=== Wastebasket taxa ===
Many dubious species have been assigned to Basilosaurus in the past which have since been invalidated or were too incomplete to determine anything.

==== Nomina dubia ====
A nomen dubium is a scientific name that is of unknown or doubtful application. There are a few documented cases of this being applied to Basilosaurus in the past.

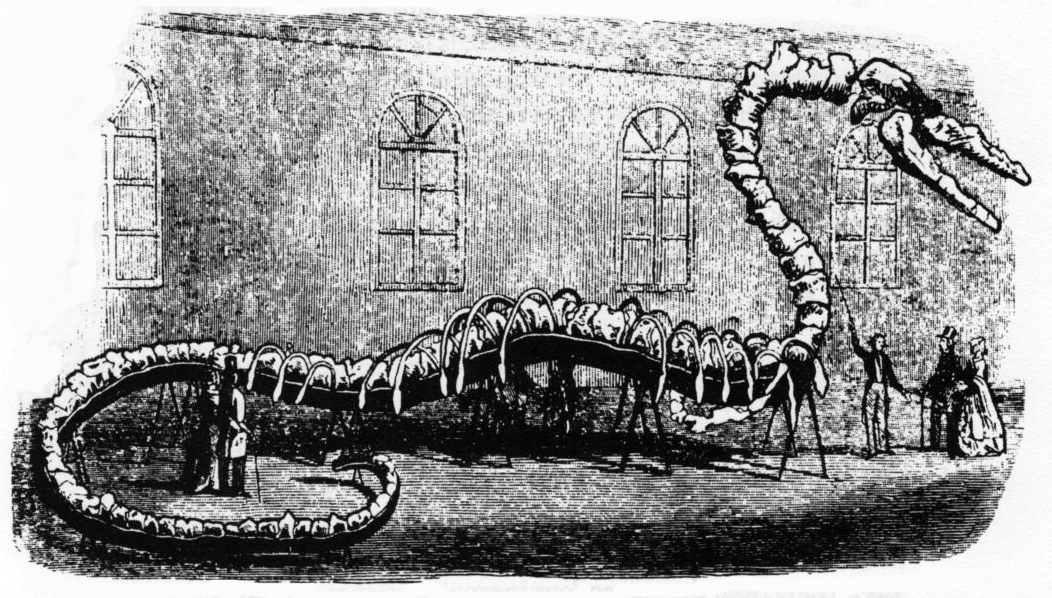
Albert Koch's "Hydrarchos" fossil skeleton from 1845, two Basilosaurus or Pontogeneus skeletons tied together which was presented as the bones of a 35-meter (114 ft) ancient sea monster. The skeleton was destroyed during the Great Chicago Fire in 1871.

- Zeuglodon vredense or vredensis was named in the 19th century based on a single, isolated tooth without any kind of accompanying description, and Kellogg 1936 therefore declared it a nomen nudum.
- Zeuglodon puschi[i] was a species that was said to come from Poland, it was named by Brandt 1873. Kellogg 1936 noted that the species is based on an incomplete vertebra of indeterminable position and, therefore, that the species is invalid.
- Zeuglodon brachyspondylus was described by Johannes Peter Müller based on some vertebrae from "Zeuglodon hydrarchus", better known as "Dr." Albert Koch's "Hydrarchos" (first called "H. sillimani", then "H. harlani"). Kellogg 1936, synonymized it with Pontogeneus priscus, which a 2005 study declared a nomen dubium.

==== Reassigned species ====
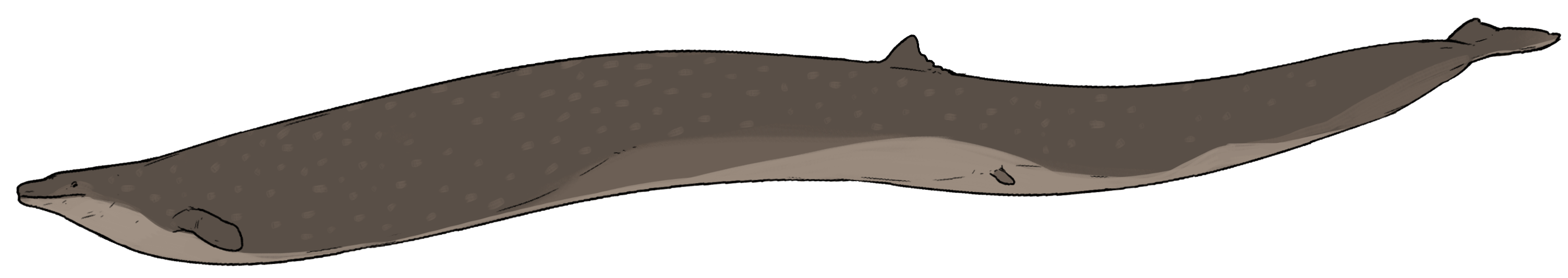
Restoration of B. cetoides

- Basilosaurus drazindai was named by a 1997 study based on a single lumbar vertebra. Originally, the species was thought to have lived in Pakistan and the UK. It was later declared a nomen dubium by Uhen (2013), but Gingerich and Zouhri (2015) reassigned it to the genus Eocetus. This species was at one point in time concluded to be the earliest record of the genus Basilosaurus, before its reclassification.
- Zeuglodon elliotsmithii, Z. sensitivius, and Z. zitteli were synonymized and grouped under the genus Saghacetus by a 1992 study.
- Zeuglodon paulsoni from Ukraine (then the Russian Empire) was named by Brandt 1873. It was synonymized with Platyosphys but is now considered nomen dubium. Gingerich and Zouhri (2015), however, maintain Platyosphys as valid.
- Basilosaurus caucasicus also known as Basilosaurus caucasicum or Zeuglodon caucasicum was a species described in the Russian Empire, it gets its name from the Caucasus of where it was found in the 1890s. The fossil was reassigned to the toothed whale Microzeuglodon caucasicum.
- Basilosaurus harwoodi was discovered in the Murray River near Wellington in South Australia. This species classification was controversial; T. S. Hall (1911) placed Basilosaurus harwoodi (or Zeuglodon harwoodi) in the genus Metasqualodon.
- In 1906, German naturalist Othenio Abel thought fossils from the Eocene of Alabama, previously described in 1900 as being a Basilosaurus hip bone by American zoologist Frederic Augustus Lucas, represented the shoulder of a large bird similar to Gastornis, and named it Alabamornis gigantea. Lucas later countered his conclusion in 1908 as he reassigned the fossil specimens to the original conclusion of a Basilosaurus hip bone.
- In 1876, Harry Seeley described a skull found in the Wanklyn's Barton Cliff in the United Kingdom as a new species of Zeuglodon, Z. wanklyni. This specimen, however, has since been lost and been referred to as Zygorhiza wanklyni by Kellogg 1936 or to as a nomen dubium. In 2022, Gingerich and colleagues suggested that the lost skull possibly belongs to Pachycetus. In 2026, Henk Jan van Vliet and colleagues redescribed the taxon as a new genus of dorudontine basilosaurid, Bartoncetus, on the basis of the proposed neotype (or possibly syntype) postcranial specimen that may or may not be from the same individual of the lost skull.

== Description ==
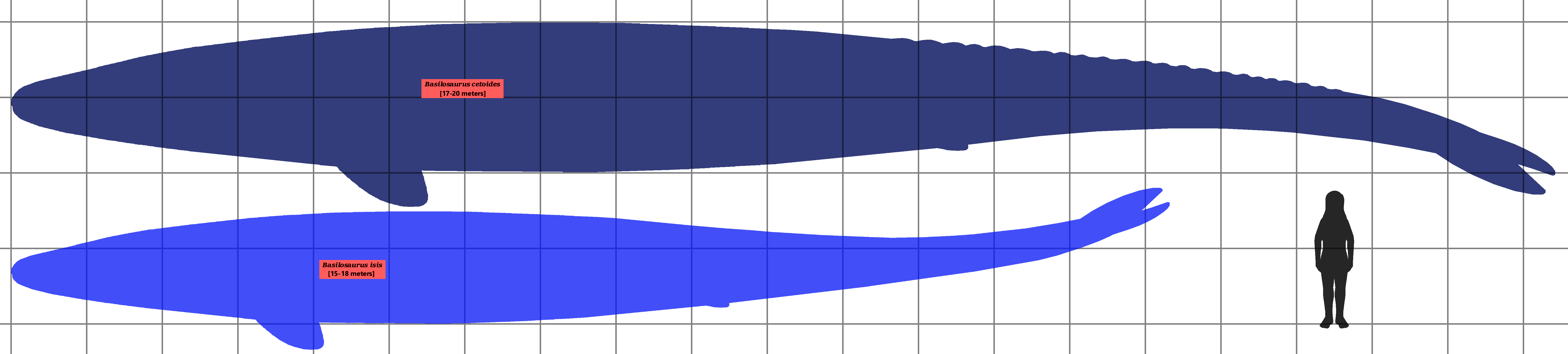
Size compared to a human

Basilosaurus is one of the largest animals known to exist between the K–Pg extinction event 66 million years ago (mya) and around 15 million years ago when modern cetaceans began to reach enormous sizes. B. cetoides measured 17–20 m (56–66 ft) long and B. isis measured 15–18 m (49–59 ft) long. A 1998 study estimated that B. cetoides weighed more than 5.8 metric tons (6.4 short tons) and B. isis weighed nearly 6.5 metric tons (7.2 short tons), while a 2025 study estimated that a 18.35 m (60.2 ft) long B. cetoides weighed 15 metric tons (17 short tons). Basilosaurus is distinguished from other genera of basilosaurids by its larger body size and its more elongated posterior thoracic, lumbar, and anterior caudal vertebrae. Basilosaurus does not have the vertically oriented metapophyses seen in its closest relative the basilosaurid known as Basiloterus. Basilosaurus is considered to be the largest of archeocete whales.

=== Cranium ===
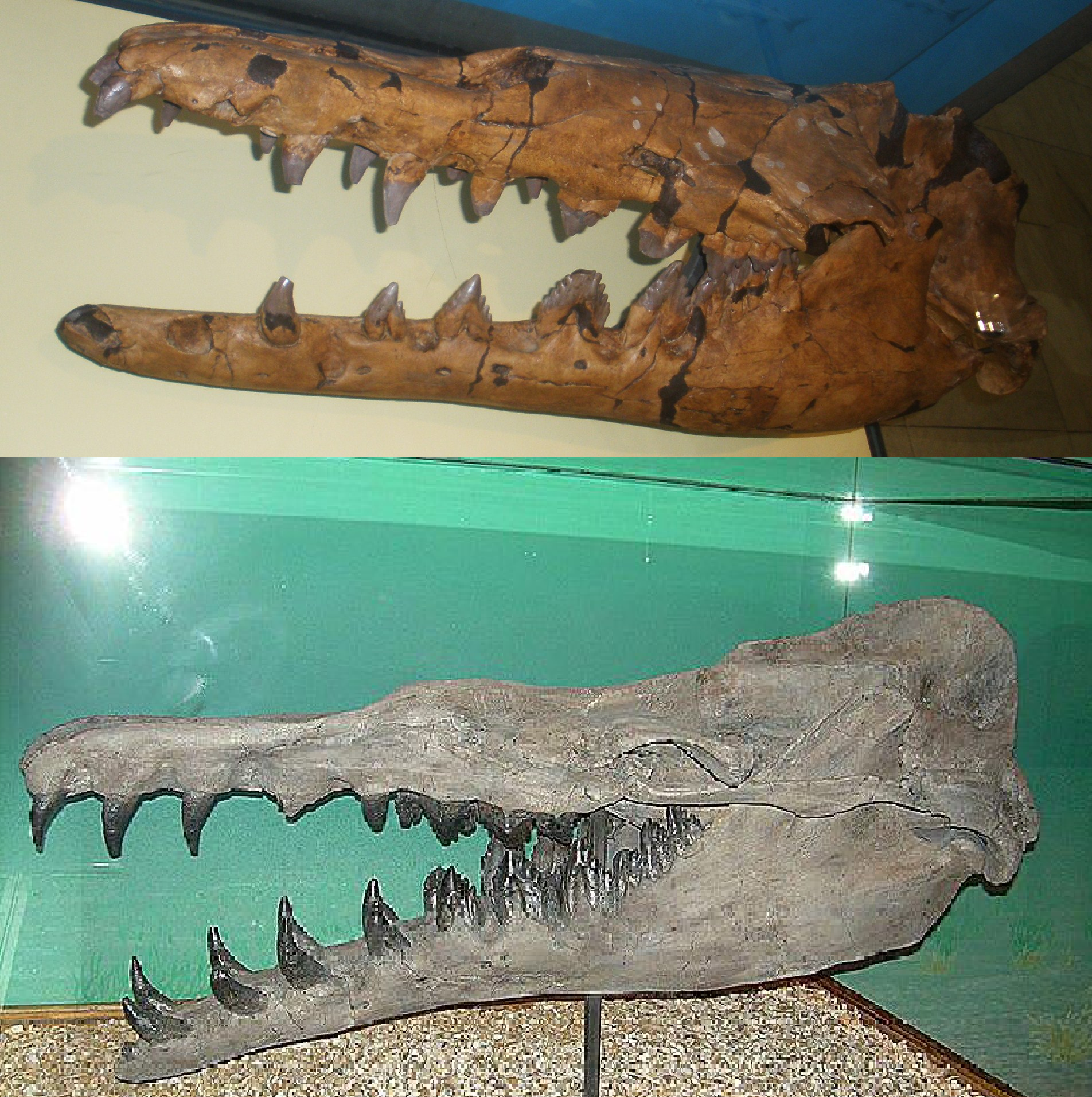
Comparison of the skulls of Basilosaurus isis (fossil at Naturmuseum Senckenberg, top) and B. cetoides (fossil from the North American Museum of Ancient Life, bottom)

The dental formula for B. isis is 3.1.4.23.1.4.3. The upper and lower molars and second to fourth premolars are double-rooted and high-crowned.

The head of Basilosaurus did not have room for a melon like modern toothed whales, and the brain was smaller in comparison, as well. They are not believed to have had the echolocation capabilities nor the social dynamics of extant cetaceans.

A 2011 study concluded that the skull of Basilosaurus is asymmetrical like in modern toothed whales, and not, as previously assumed, symmetrical like in baleen whales and artiodactyls (which are closely related to cetaceans). In modern toothed whales, this asymmetry is associated with high-frequency sound production and echolocation, neither of which is thought to have been present in Basilosaurus. This probably evolved to detect sound underwater, with a fatty sound-receiving pad in the mandible.

In the skull, the inner and middle ear are enclosed by a dense tympanic bulla. The synapomorphic cetacean air sinus system is partially present in basilosaurids, including the pterygoid, peribullary, maxillary, and frontal sinuses. The periotic bone, which surrounds the inner ear, is partially isolated. The mandibular canal is large and laterally flanked by a thin bony wall, the pan bone or acoustic fenestra. These features enabled basilosaurs to hear directionally in water.

The ear of basilosaurids is more derived than those in earlier archaeocetes, such as remingtonocetids and protocetids, in the acoustic isolation provided by the air-filled sinuses inserted between the ear and the skull. The basilosaurid ear did, however, have a large external auditory meatus, strongly reduced in modern cetaceans, but, though this was probably functional, it can have been of little use under water.

=== Hind limbs ===
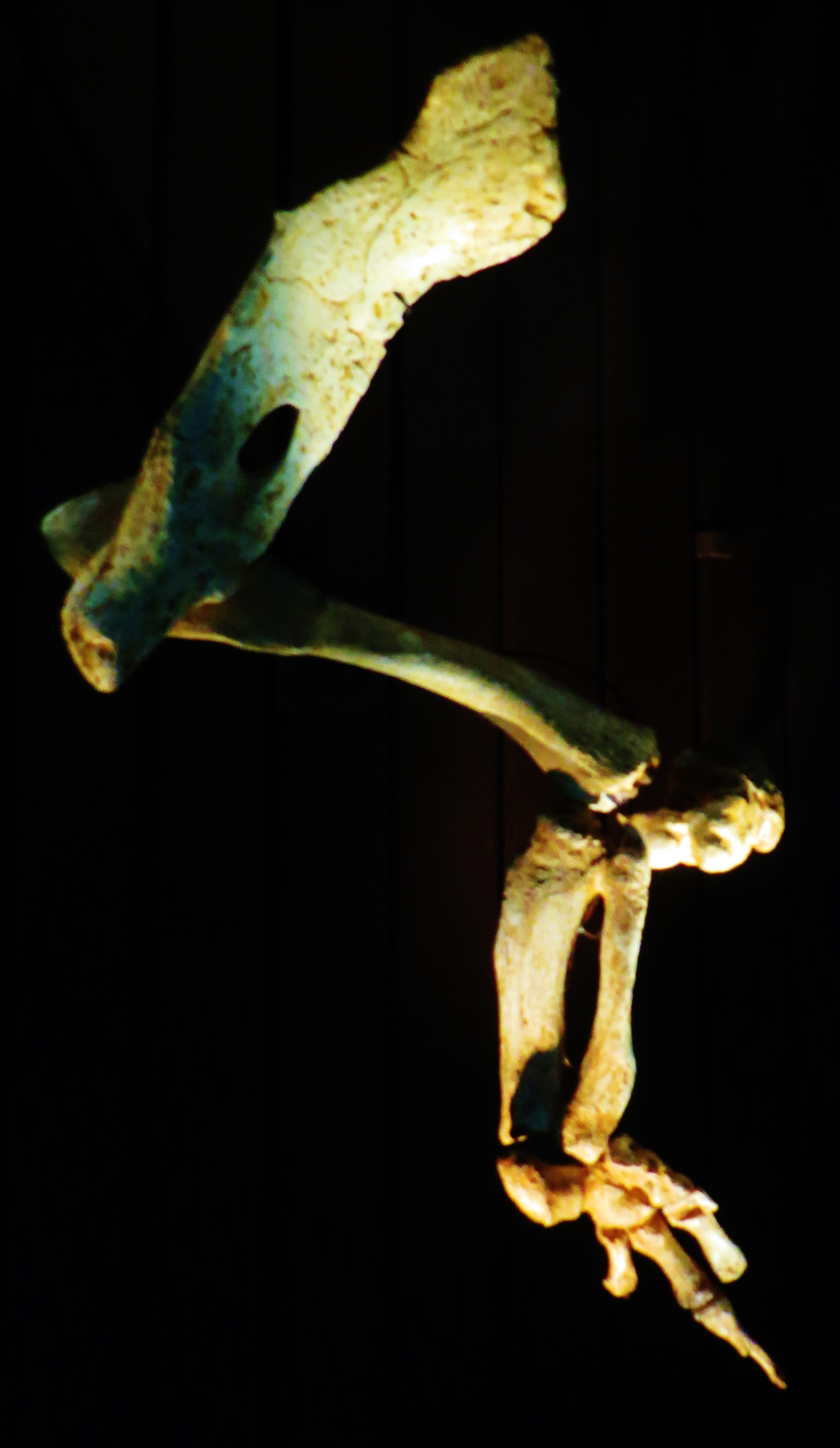
B. isis hind limb

A 16-meter (52 ft) individual of B. isis had 35-centimeter-long (14 in) hind limbs with fused tarsals and only three digits. The limited size of the limb and the absence of an articulation with the sacral vertebrae make a locomotory function unlikely. Analysis has shown that the reduced limbs could rapidly adduct between only two positions. Possible uses for the structure have been given, such as clasper-like body functions (compare to the function of pelvic spurs, the last vestiges of limbs in certain modern snakes). These limbs would have been used to guide the animals' long bodies during mating.

=== Spine and movement ===
A complete Basilosaurus skeleton was found in 2015, and several attempts have been made to reconstruct the vertebral column from partial skeletons. Kellogg 1936 estimated a total of 58 vertebrae, based on two partial and nonoverlapping skeletons of B. cetoides from Alabama. More complete fossils uncovered in Egypt in the 1990s allowed a more accurate estimation: the vertebral column of B. isis has been reconstructed from three overlapping skeletons to a total of 70 vertebrae with a vertebral formula interpreted as seven cervical, 18 thoracic, 20 lumbar and sacral, and 25 caudal vertebrae. The vertebral formula of B. cetoides can be assumed to be the same.

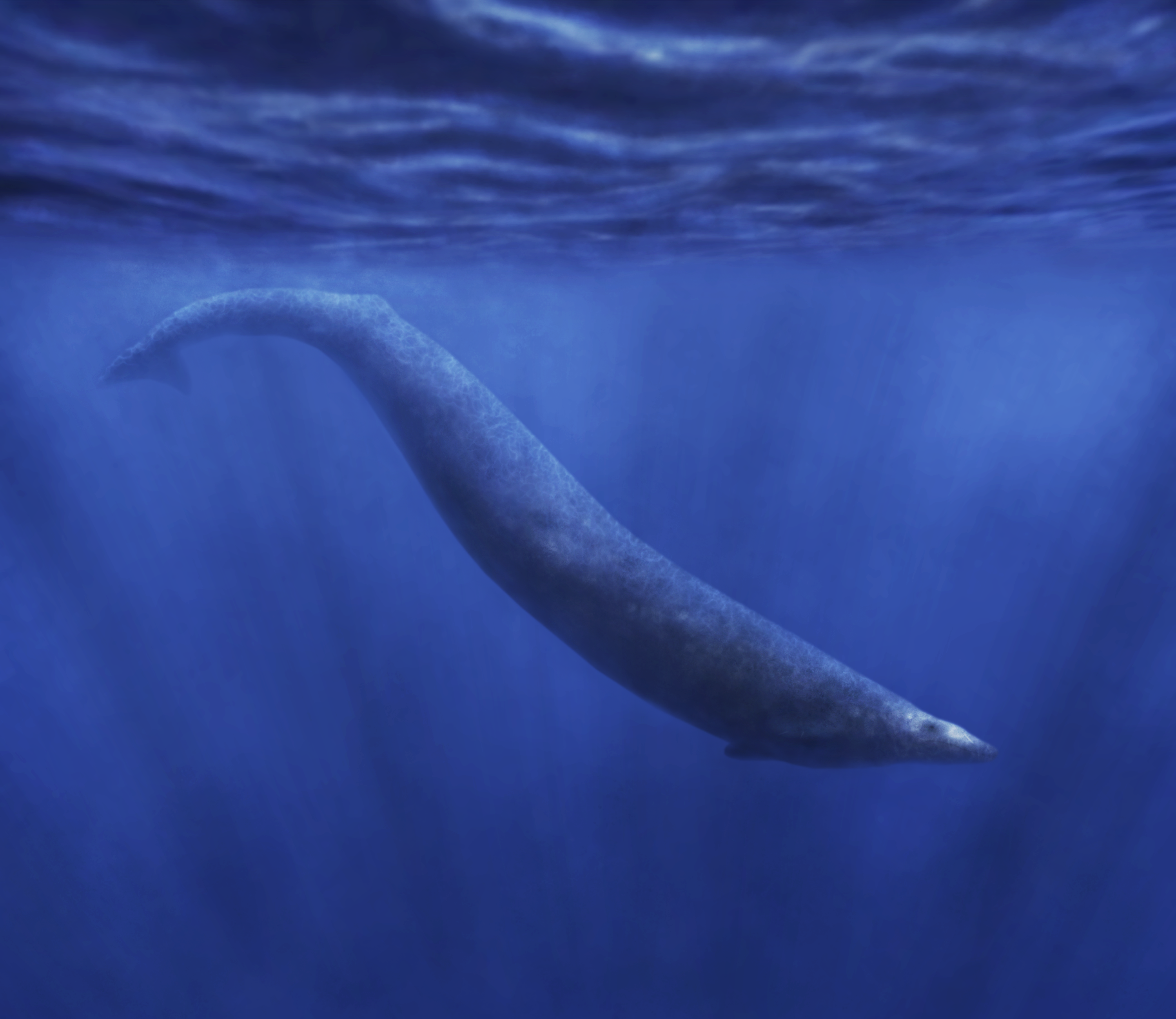
Restoration of Basilosaurus cetoides

Basilosaurus has an anguilliform (eel-like) body shape because of the elongation of the centra of the thoracic through anterior caudal vertebrae. In life, these vertebrae were filled with marrow, and because of the enlarged size, this made them buoyant. Basilosaurus probably swam predominantly in two dimensions at the sea surface, in contrast to the smaller Dorudon, which was likely a diving, three-dimensional swimmer. The skeletal anatomy of the tail suggests that a small fluke was probably present, which would have aided only vertical motion.

Similarly sized thoracic, lumbar, sacral, and caudal vertebrae imply that it moved in an anguilliform fashion, but predominantly in the vertical plane. Paleontologist Philip D. Gingerich theorized that Basilosaurus may also have moved in a very odd, horizontal anguilliform fashion to some degree, something completely unknown in modern cetaceans. The vertebrae appear to have been hollow, and likely also fluid-filled. This would imply that Basilosaurus typically functioned in only two dimensions at the ocean surface, compared with the three-dimensional habits of most other cetaceans. Judging from the relatively weak axial musculature and the thick bones in the limbs, Basilosaurus is not believed to have been capable of sustained swimming or deep diving, or terrestrial locomotion.

== Paleobiology ==
=== Feeding ===
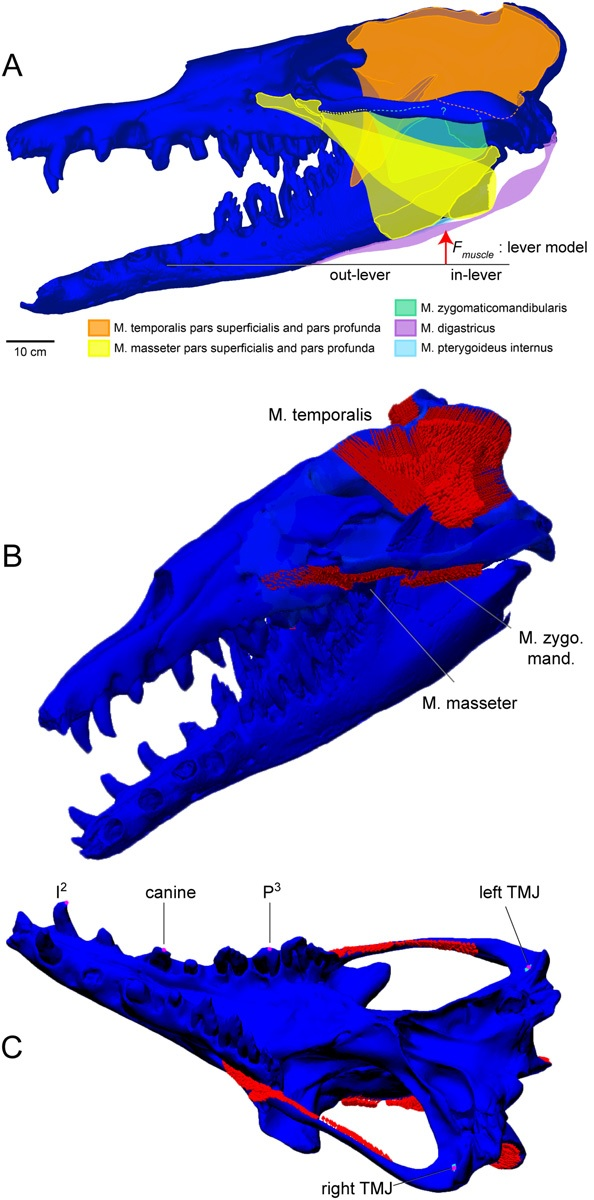
B. isis jaw muscles

The cheek teeth of Basilosaurus retain a complex morphology and functional occlusion. Heavy wear on the teeth reveals that food was first chewed then swallowed. Scientists were able to estimate the bite force of Basilosaurus isis by analyzing the scarred skull bones of another species of prehistoric whale, Dorudon, and concluded that it could exert a maximum bite force of at least 16,400 newtons (3,700 lbf) and could possibly exceed 20,000 newtons (4,500 lbf), roughly equivalent to the range between modern alligators and crocodiles.

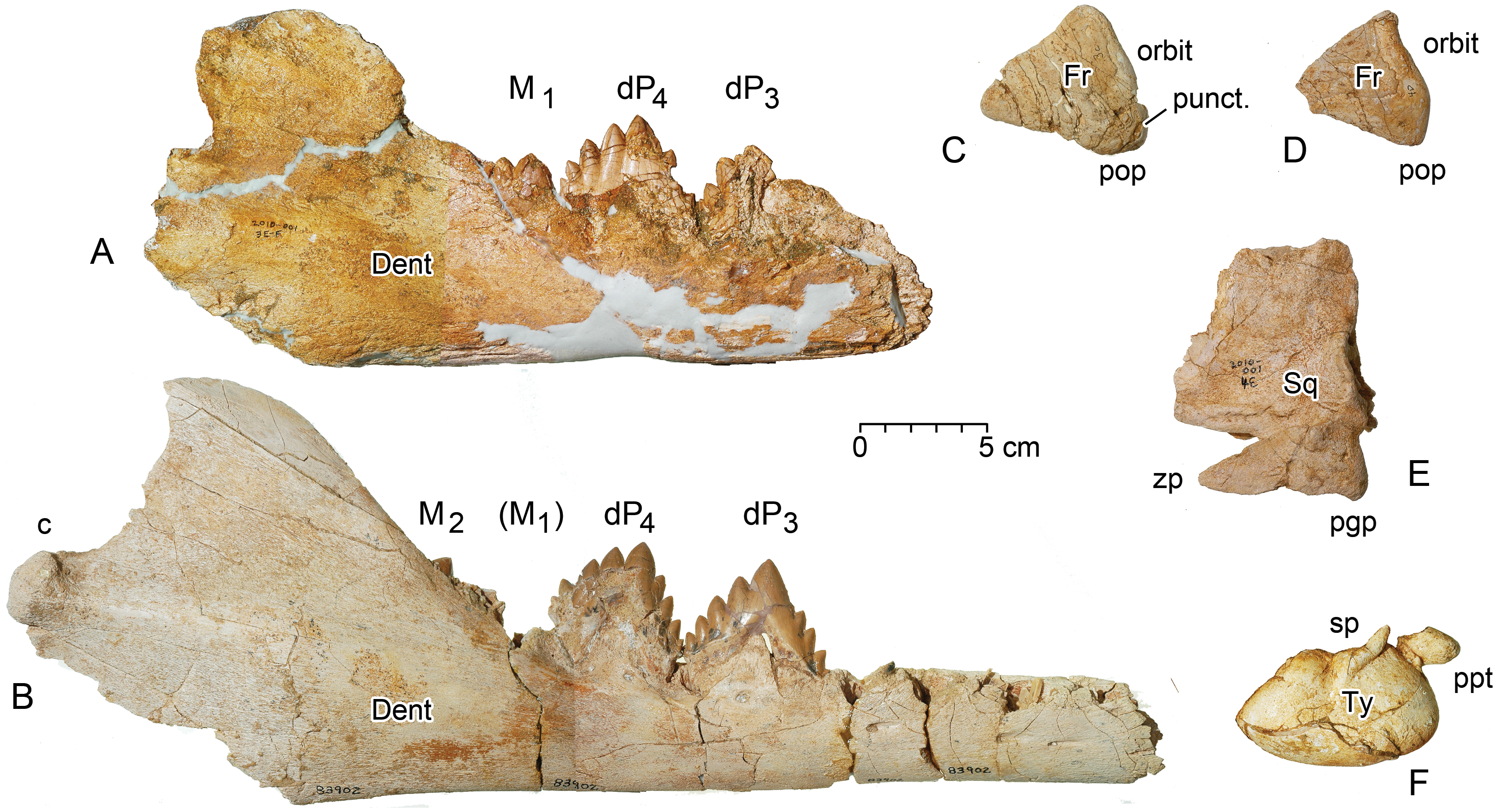
Remains of at least two juvenile Dorudon atrox found within the stomach of a Basilosaurus isis

Analyses of the stomach contents of B. cetoides has shown that this species fed exclusively on fish and large sharks, while bite marks on the skulls of juvenile Dorudon have been matched with the dentition of B. isis, suggesting a dietary difference between the two species, similar to that found in different populations of modern killer whales. It was probably an active predator rather than a scavenger. The discovery of juvenile Dorudon at Wadi Al Hitan bearing distinctive bite marks on their skulls indicates that B. isis would have aimed for the skulls of its victims to kill its prey, and then subsequently torn its meals apart, based on the disarticulated remains of the Dorudon skeletons. The finding further cements theories that B. isis was an apex predator that may have hunted newborn and juvenile Dorudon at Wadi Al Hitan when mothers of the latter came to give birth. The stomach contents of an elderly male B. isis not only includes Dorudon but the fish Pycnodus mokattamensis.

=== Paleoecology ===
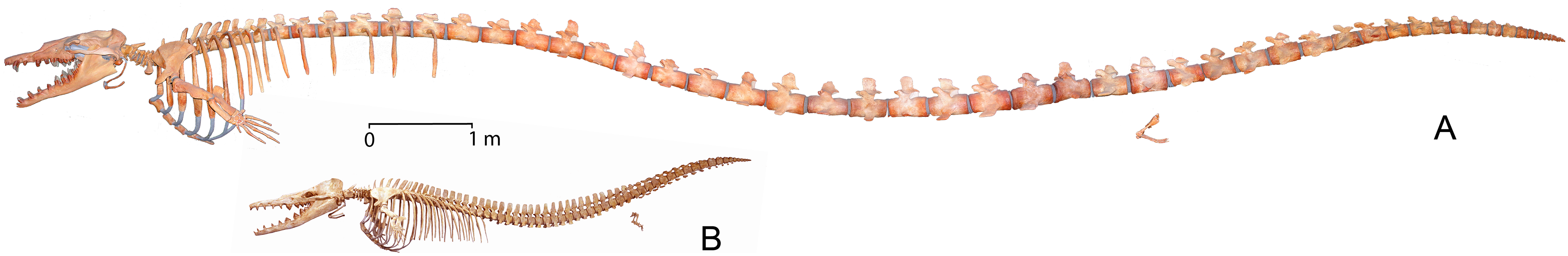
Basilosaurus isis (A) and Dorudon atrox (B) size comparison

Basilosaurus would have been the top predator of its environment. It lived in the warm tropical environment of the Eocene in areas abundant with sea grasses, such as Thalassodendron, Thalassia (also known as turtle grass) and Halodule. Based on the localities where its fossils are discovered, Basilosaurus would have preferred to live in the shallows, specifically in the middle to outer neritic zones of the inland sea. It would have coexisted with the dolphin-like Dorudon, the whales Cynthiacetus and Basiloterus, the primitive sirenian Protosiren, the early elephant Moeritherium, the sea turtle Puppigerus and many sharks, such as Galeocerdo alabamensis, Physogaleus, Otodus, Squatina prima, Striatolamia, Carcharocles sokolovi and Isurus praecursor.

== Extinction ==
Basilosaurus' fossil record seems to end at about 35–33.9 mya. Basilosaurus extinction coincides with the Eocene–Oligocene extinction event which happened 33.9 mya, which also resulted in the extinction of almost all other archaeocetes. The event has been attributed to volcanic activity, meteor impacts, or a sudden change in climate (such as the environment getting cooler), the latter of which might have caused changes in the ocean by disrupting oceanic circulation, thus limiting the numbers of prey for predators like Basilosaurus to feed on. Basilosaurus went extinct leaving no descendants, along with the rest of the Archaeocetes. After their extinction, the new currents and deep ocean upwelling created a new environment that favored the evolutionary diversification of modern cetaceans (Neocetes) such as early toothed and baleen whales, from more advanced Archaeocetes that evolved the traits associated with Neocetes.

== Classification ==
Below is the phylogenetic analysis on the placement of Basilosaurus. Two subfamilies exist in Basilosauridae: Basilosaurinae which includes Basilosaurus, and Dorudontinae. These groups have been declared invalid in the past. Dorudon remains were once thought to represent juvenile Basilosaurus.

- †Basilosaurinae
  - - - †Basilosaurus
      - †Basiloterus
      - †Eocetus
    - †Platyosphys
  - †Pachycetus

== In popular culture ==
The species B. cetoides is the state fossil of Alabama and Mississippi. During the early 19th century, B. cetoides fossils were so common (and sufficiently large) that they were regularly used as furniture in the American South.

In the field of cryptozoology, Basilosaurus has been proposed as a possible identity for various sea serpent sightings, specifically those described as having multiple humps or an elongated, serpentine shape. This connection is often drawn because Basilosaurus is believed to have moved its spine in an undulating, eel-like fashion rather than the vertical fluke movement of modern whales. However, paleontologists discount these theories, noting that there is no fossil evidence of the lineage surviving past the Eocene extinction event, roughly 34 million years ago.

Basilosaurus is featured in the BBC's Walking with... series in Walking with Beasts and Sea Monsters.

In the 1851 novel Moby-Dick by Herman Melville, Ishmael cites the Basilosaurus during his studies as a possible whale fossil.

== See also ==
- Evolution of cetaceans
- List of cetaceans
  - Livyatan melvillei – occupied a similar ecological niche
