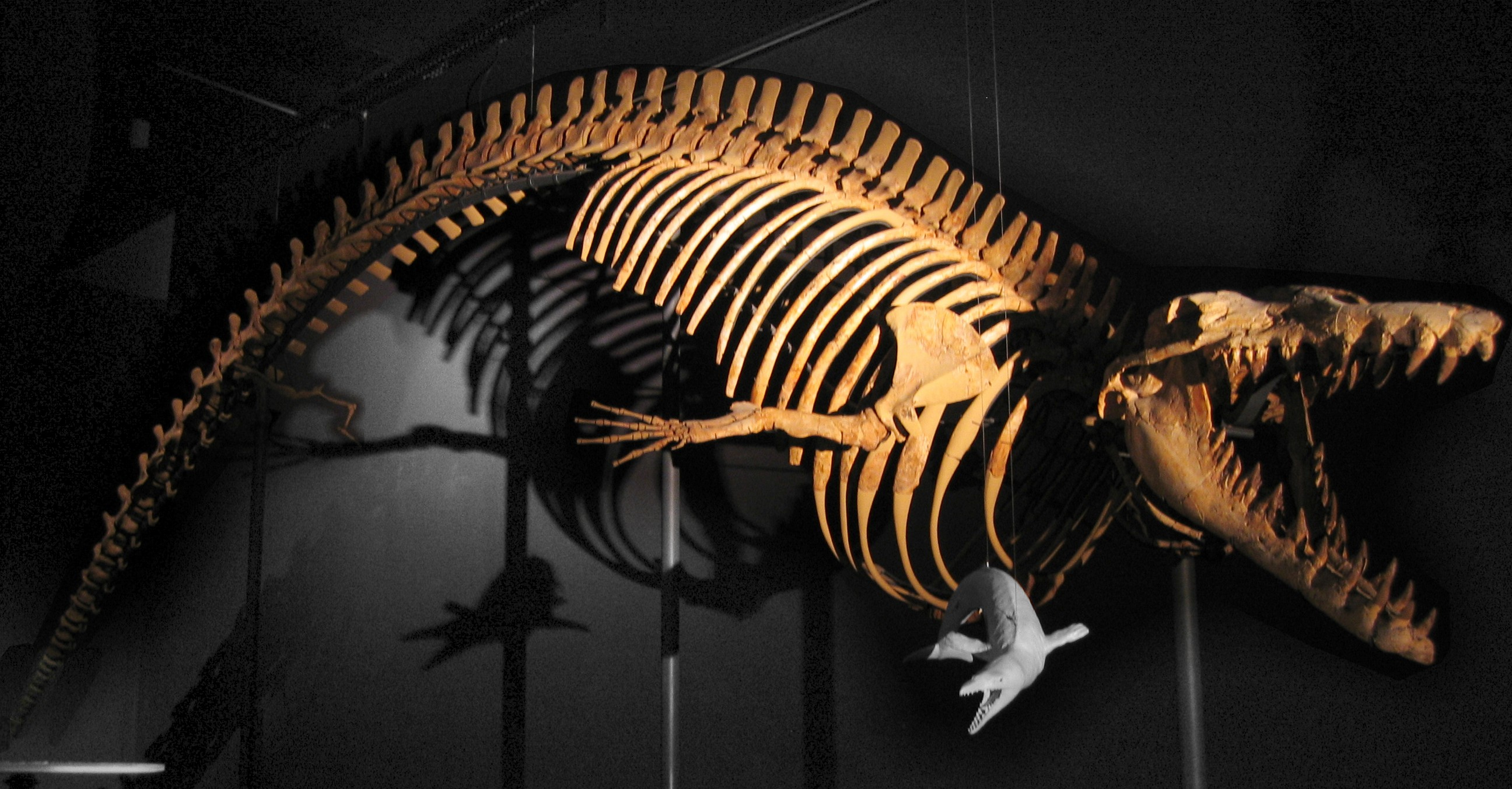
- Cynthiacetus skeleton

Scientific classification
- Kingdom: Animalia
- Phylum: Chordata
- Class: Mammalia
- Order: Artiodactyla
- Infraorder: Cetacea
- Family: †Basilosauridae
- Subfamily: †Dorudontinae; Miller, 1923

Genera
- See text

= Dorudontinae =

Dorudontinae Temporal range: 43.3–33.9 Ma

Subfamily of mammals

Dorudontinae are a group of extinct cetaceans that are related to Basilosaurus.

== Classification ==
- Subfamily Dorudontinae
  - Genus Ancalecetus
    - Ancalecetus simonsi
  - Genus Bartoncetus
    - Bartoncetus wanklyni
  - Genus Chrysocetus
    - Chrysocetus fouadassii
    - Chrysocetus healyorum
  - Genus Cynthiacetus
    - Cynthiacetus maxwelli
    - Cynthiacetus peruvianus
  - Genus Dorudon
    - Dorudon atrox
    - Dorudon serratus
  - Genus Masracetus
    - Masracetus markgrafi
  - Genus Ocucajea
    - Ocucajea picklingi
  - Genus Saghacetus
    - Saghacetus osiris
  - Genus Stromerius
    - Stromerius nidensis
  - Genus Zygorhiza
    - Zygorhiza kochii
