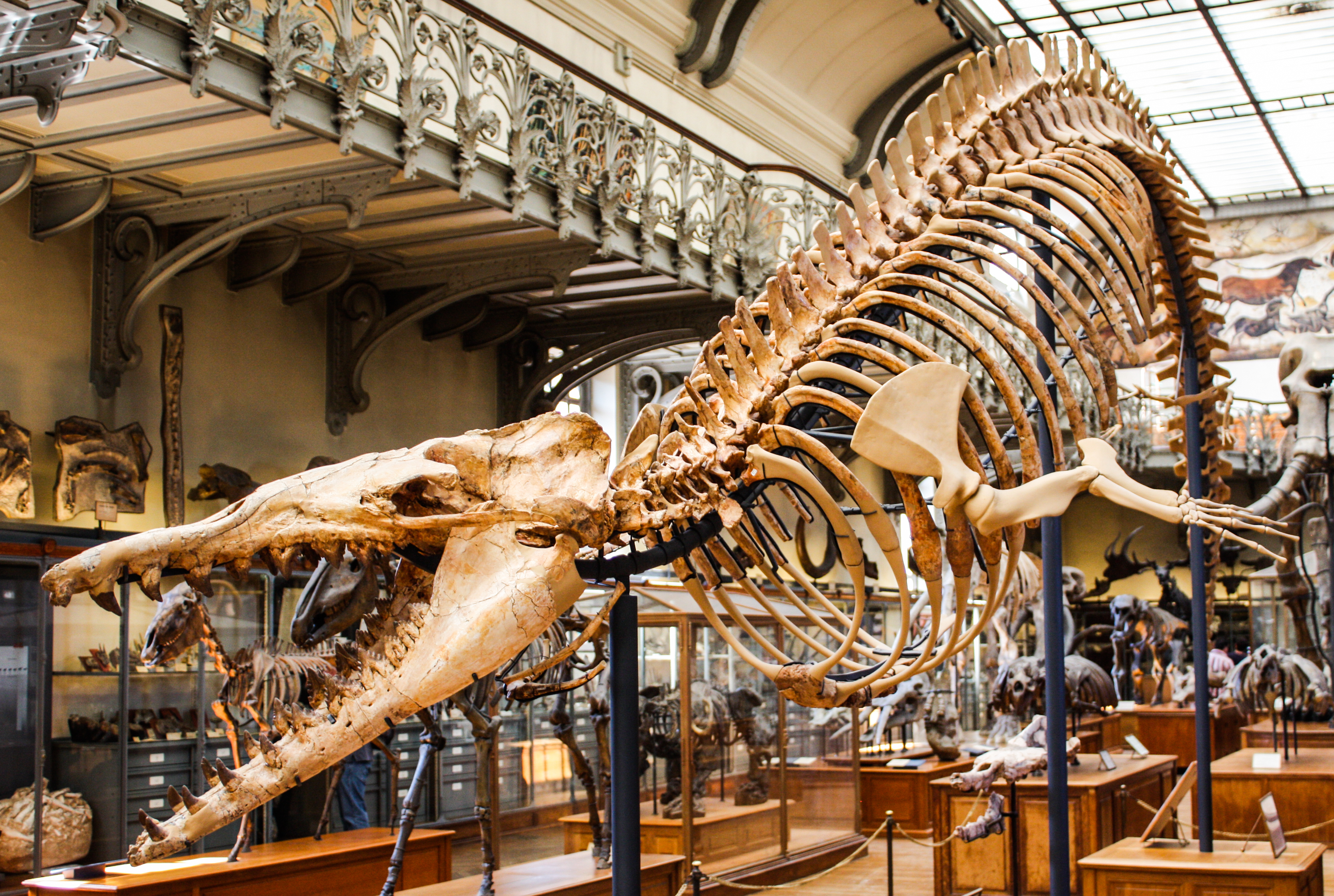
- Skeleton at the MNHN, Paris

Scientific classification
- Kingdom: Animalia
- Phylum: Chordata
- Class: Mammalia
- Infraclass: Placentalia
- Order: Artiodactyla
- Infraorder: Cetacea
- Family: †Basilosauridae
- Subfamily: †Dorudontinae
- Genus: †Cynthiacetus; Uhen 2005

Species
- †C. maxwelli (type) Uhen 2005; †C. peruvianus Martínez-Cáceres & de Muizon 2011

= Cynthiacetus =

Cynthiacetus Temporal range: Late Eocene ~40.4–33.9 Ma

Extinct genus of whales

Cynthiacetus is an extinct genus of basilosaurid early whale that lived during the Late Eocene (Bartonian-Priabonian, 40.4 to 33.9 million years ago.) Specimens have been found in the southeastern United States and Peru (Otuma Formation).

== Discovery and naming ==
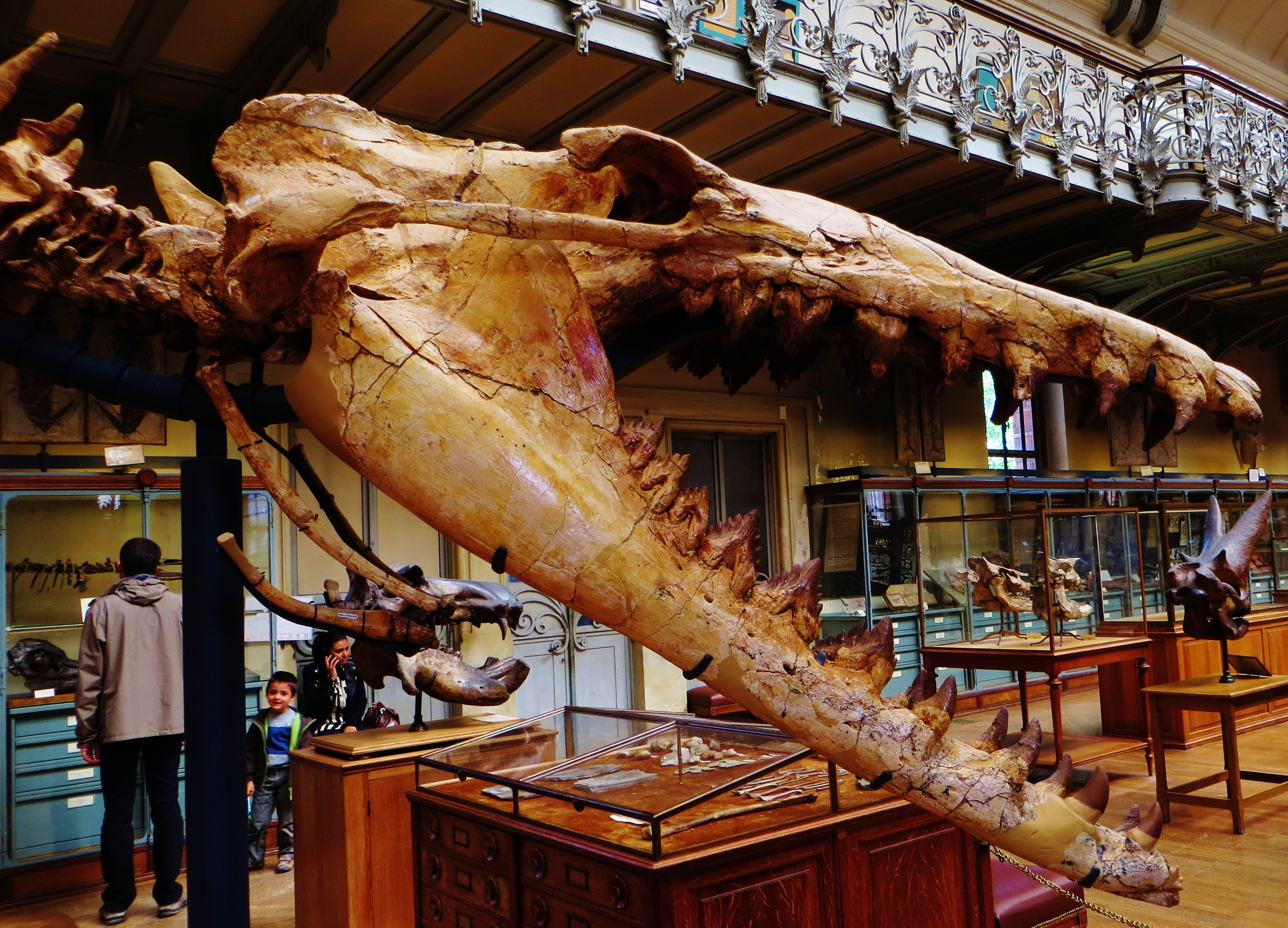
Skull of C. peruvianus at the MNHN, Paris

Cynthiacetus was named after the town of Cynthia, Mississippi, close to where the type specimen for the species C. maxwelli was discovered.

== Description ==
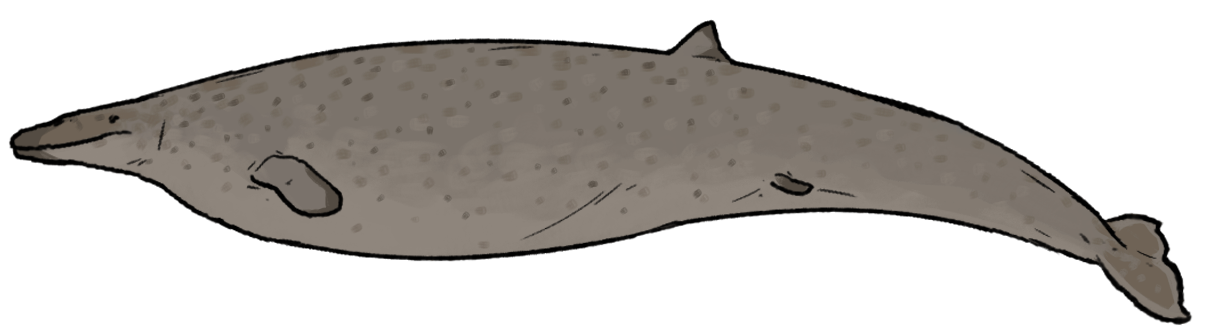
Life restoration

The skull of C. maxwelli was similar in size and morphology to that of Basilosaurus cetoides, but Cynthiacetus lacked the elongated vertebrae of Basilosaurus. Uhen 2005 erected the genus to avoid the nomen dubium Pontogeneus (which was based on poorly described and now vanished specimens). Cynthiacetus was smaller than Masracetus.

The South American species C. peruvianus, the first archaeocete to be described on that continent, mainly differs from C. maxwelli in the number of cuspids in the lower premolars, but it also has the greatest numbers of thoracic vertebrae (20). The type specimen of C. peruvianus belonged to an adult individual measuring around 9 m (30 ft) long and weighing up to 4 metric tons (4.4 short tons).
