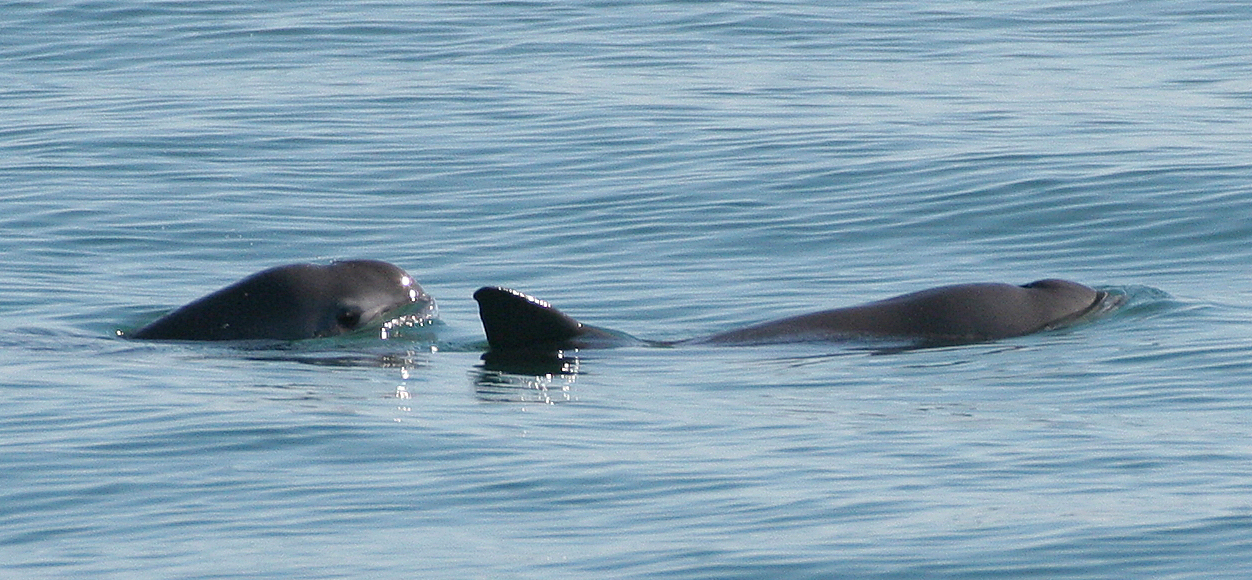
- A pair of vaquitas
- Size compared to an average human

Conservation status
- Critically Endangered (IUCN 3.1)
- CITES Appendix I

Scientific classification
- Kingdom: Animalia
- Phylum: Chordata
- Class: Mammalia
- Order: Artiodactyla
- Infraorder: Cetacea
- Family: Phocoenidae
- Genus: Phocoena
- Species: P. sinus

Binomial name
- Phocoena sinus Norris & McFarland, 1958
- IUCN range of the Vaquita Extant (resident)
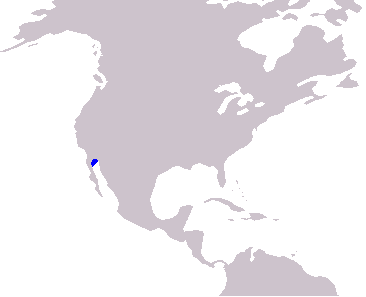

= Vaquita =

Vaquita Temporal range: Holocene

Endangered species of porpoise

The vaquita (/vəˈkiːtə/ və-KEE-tə; Phocoena sinus) is a species of porpoise endemic to the northern end of the Gulf of California in Baja California, Mexico. Reaching a maximum body length of 150 cm (4.9 ft) (females) or 140 cm (4.6 ft) (males), it is the smallest of all living cetaceans. The species is currently on the brink of extinction, and is listed as Critically Endangered by the IUCN Red List; the steep decline in abundance is primarily due to bycatch in gillnets from the illegal totoaba fishery.

== Taxonomy ==
The vaquita was defined as a species by two zoologists, Kenneth S. Norris and William N. McFarland, in 1958 after studying the morphology of skull specimens found on the beach. It was not until nearly thirty years later, in 1985, that fresh specimens allowed scientists to describe their external appearance fully.

The genus Phocoena comprises four species of porpoise, most of which inhabit coastal waters (the spectacled porpoise is more oceanic). The vaquita is most closely related to Burmeister's porpoise (Phocoena spinipinnis) and less so to the spectacled porpoise (Phocoena dioptrica), two species limited to the Southern Hemisphere. Their ancestors are thought to have moved north across the equator more than 2.5 million years ago during a period of cooling in the Pleistocene. Genome sequencing from an individual captured in 2017 indicates that the ancestral vaquitas had already gone through a major population bottleneck in the past, which may explain why the few remaining individuals are still healthy despite the very low population size.

"Vaquita" is Spanish for "little cow".

== Description ==
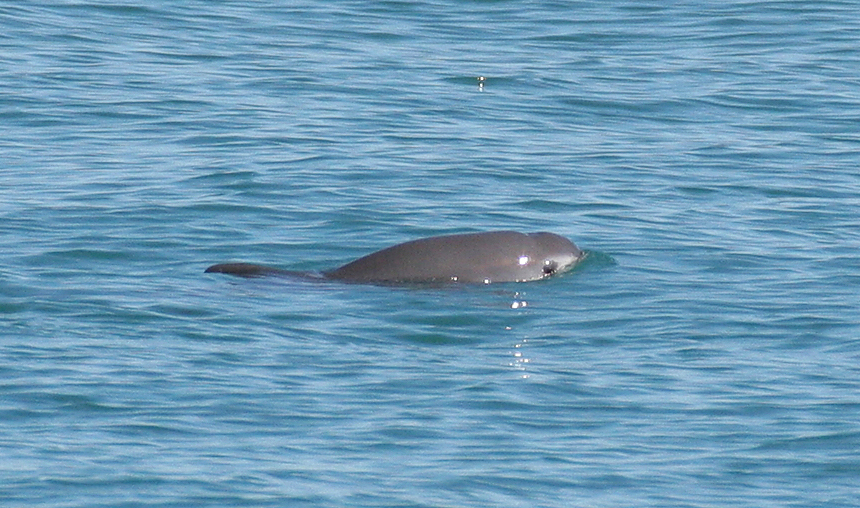
Characteristic dark eye rings

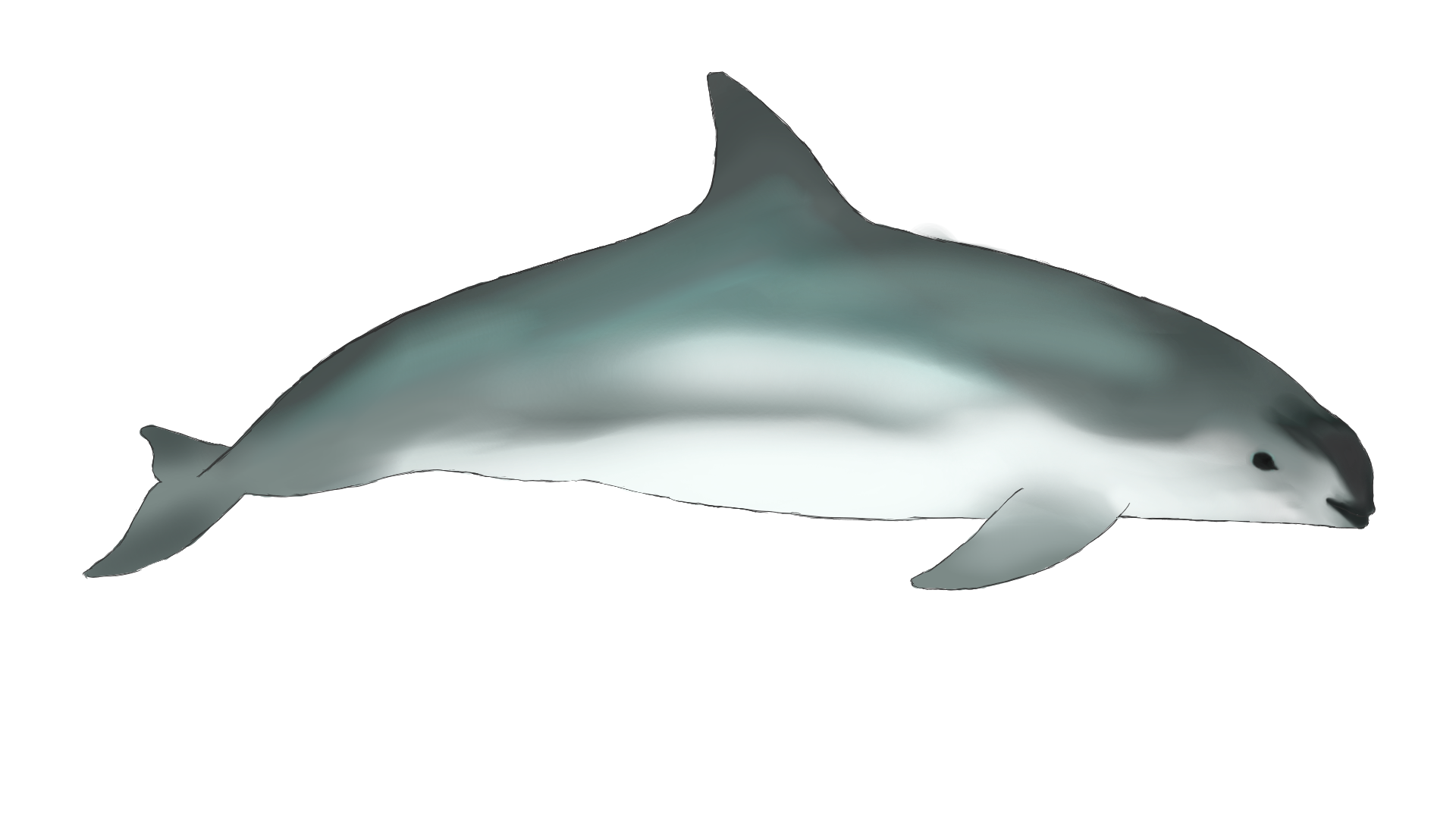
Illustration of a vaquita

The smallest living species of cetacean, the vaquita can be easily distinguished from any other species in its range. It has a small body with an unusually tall triangular dorsal fin, a rounded head, and no distinguished beak. The coloration is mostly grey with a darker back and a white ventral field. Prominent black patches surround its lips and eyes. Sexual dimorphism is apparent in body size, with mature females being longer than males and having larger heads and wider flippers. Females reach a maximum size of about 150 cm (4.9 ft), while males reach about 140 cm (4.6 ft). Dorsal fin height is greater in males than in females. They are also known to weigh around 27 kg (60 lb) to 68 kg (150 lb). This makes them one of the smallest species in the porpoise family.

== Distribution and habitat ==
Vaquita habitat is restricted to a small portion of the upper Gulf of California (also called the Sea of Cortez), making this the smallest range of any cetacean species. They live in shallow, turbid waters of less than 150 m (490 ft) depth.

== Behaviour and ecology ==
=== Diet ===
Vaquitas are generalists, foraging on a variety of demersal fish species, crustaceans, and squids, though benthic fish such as grunts and croakers make up most of the diet.

=== Social behavior ===
Vaquitas are generally seen alone or in pairs, often with a calf, but have been observed in small groups of up to 10 individuals.

Little is known about the life history of this species. Life expectancy is estimated at 20 years and age of sexual maturity is somewhere between 3 and 6 years of age. While an initial analysis of stranded vaquitas estimated a two-year calving interval, recent sightings data suggest that vaquitas can reproduce annually. It is thought that vaquitas have a polygynous mating system in which males compete for females. This competition is evidenced by the presence of sexual dimorphism (females are larger than males), small group sizes, and large testes (accounting for nearly 3% of body mass).

=== Reproduction ===
Vaquitas reach sexual maturity from three to six years old. Vaquitas have synchronous reproduction, suggesting that calving span is greater than a year. Their pregnancies last from 10 to 11 months, and vaquita calves are nursed by their mothers for 6–8 months until becoming independent. Vaquitas give birth about every other year to a single calf, usually between the months of February and April. Because of their low reproduction rates, long gestation periods and larger species size, vaquitas are considered a K-selected species. K-selected species are more vulnerable to extinction as they cannot repopulate at the rate of r-selected species. Vaquitas are on the brink of extinction because their numbers are few and they cannot replenish their population fast enough to exceed the number of vaquitas dying off.

== Threats ==
Given their proximity to the coast, vaquitas are exposed to habitat alteration and pollution from runoff. Pesticides present in the water as a result of runoff from agriculture are a threat as they can be ingested by the vaquitas, causing harm and even death. Exposure to toxic compounds has also had a deleterious effect on vaquitas. Bycatch, which is the incidental catch of non-target species in fishing gear, is not only the largest threat to the survival of the vaquita, but to all marine mammals around the world. A series of simulations in a 2022 study indicate that the species has a chance to survive and recover if all bycatch is halted, despite the presence of other threats. However, the biggest threat still towards vaquita are fisheries. Northern fishing fleets have had an indirect positive impact mainly on marine mammals, because fishing on predators like sharks reduces its predatory negative impact on those groups. Although the predation of sharks towards vaquita do result in a decline in population and is seen as an alternate threat, northern fishing fleets also negatively impact this small marine mammal because the negative influence of incidental catch is greater than the positive influence of predation reduction by shark fisheries.

Populations that experience a sudden decline in numbers are often more vulnerable to other threats in the future due to a bottleneck of genetic diversity within the reduced population. The reduced gene pool lowers the rate of adaptation and increases the rate of inbreeding, potentially leading to inbreeding depression. This phenomenon is attributed to the anthropogenic Allee effect, specifically on the end where small population size leads to low species fitness because of a lack of genetic diversity and the potential for inbreeding. Because of their small population size, vaquitas are experiencing a negative Allee effect, attributing to even smaller population growth rates, driving them further into extinction. However, a 2022 study on the genetic diversity of the vaquita suggests that the marine mammal's historically small population ensures it is unlikely to greatly suffer from inbreeding depression.

Attempts to start a population in captivity have proved to be more threatening to the population than helpful. A November 2017 effort ended up traumatizing and killing one female vaquita, as well as subjecting a juvenile to unnecessary stress. Still, creating a captive population could be used as a last resort to save the species and to further educate on vaquitas.

=== Fisheries bycatch ===
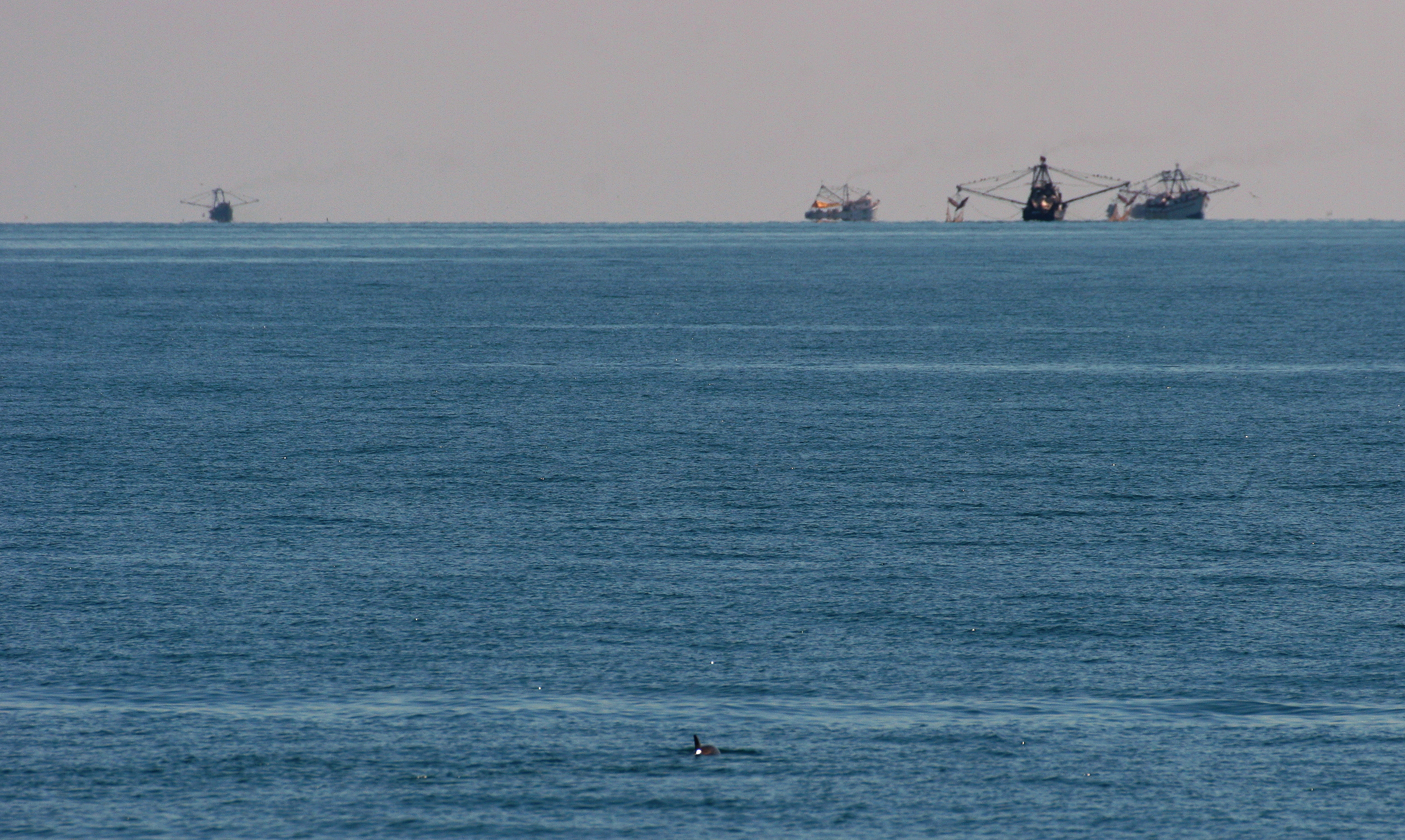
A vaquita swims in the foreground with fishing boats in the distance

Anthropogenic effects of a rise in commercial fishing such as accidental bycatch, illegal fishing, and entanglement have been linked to the cause of their decline. Shrimp fishing and gillnets create entanglement issues for the vaquita. Aspects of illegal fishing including open access fisheries and absent fisheries management have correlated towards poaching of the main prey source of the vaquita.

The drastic decline in vaquita abundance is the result of fisheries bycatch in commercial and illegal gillnets, including fisheries targeting the now-vulnerable Totoaba, shrimp, and other available fish species. Despite government regulations, including a partial gillnet ban in 2015 and establishment of a permanent gillnet exclusion zone in 2017, illegal totoaba fishing remains prevalent in vaquita habitat, and as a result the population has continued to decline. Fewer than 19 vaquitas remained in the wild in 2018. Large-mesh gillnets used in illegal fishing for totoaba caused an increase in the rate of loss of vaquitas after 2011.

In 2021, the Mexican government eliminated a "no tolerance" zone in the Upper Gulf of California and opened it up to fishing.

In 2022 the navy began to place concrete blocks with rebar hooks into what is considered the primary area for vaquita, which was designated as a zero tolerance area (ZTA) for fishing in 2020. These are known to destroy gillnets (which can cost tens of thousands of dollars) in shallower waters. Their deployment had an immediate effect on the number of fishing boats in the area. Citing reports of echolocation outside of the ZTA, the navy expanded the area in which these blocks were placed starting in November 2023 with plans to continue placing new blocks until the end of June 2024. There are some concerns that the hooks will create ghost nets, and the navy and Sea Shepherd have removed nets trapped on hooks after being caught.

=== Colorado River Delta ===
The condition of the Colorado River Delta has been altered due to extensive damming upstream; some research teams have suggested that the ecosystem destruction that resulted may affect the vaquita population to some degree. Various authorities have disagreed with the notion that the drying of the delta is a major factor for vaquita conservation; research teams have even declared these claims to be "fake science", or accused that the suggestions are politically motivated, and that Mexican researchers and government entities try to downplay the impact of net entanglement for the vaquita.

== Conservation ==
=== Population status ===
Because the vaquita was only fully described in the late 1980s, historical abundance is unknown. Since 1983, all confirmed specimens, records, and sightings of P. sinus were evaluated. There were 45 records of P. sinus that were collected by skeletal remains, photographs, and sightings in 1983. The first comprehensive vaquita survey throughout their range took place in 1997 and estimated a population of 567 individuals. By 2007 abundance was estimated to have dropped to 150. Population abundance as of 2018 was estimated at less than 19 individuals. Given the continued rate of bycatch and low reproductive output from a small population, it is estimated that there are fewer than 10 vaquitas alive as of February 2022. In 2023, it is still estimated that there are as few as 10 in the wild. A 2024 survey observed a minimum of 6 to 8 individuals (with a maximum of 9 to 11), the lowest ever counted, but this number may just be a result of the small survey area instead of an actual population decline, as vaquitas freely move in and out of the survey region. Monitoring in 2025 identified 7-10 unique individuals and the birth of new calves.

=== Conservation status ===
The vaquita is listed as critically endangered on the IUCN Red List, which is only one level above being completely extinct in the wild. It is considered the most endangered marine mammal in the world. The vaquita has been listed as critically endangered by the IUCN Red List of Threatened Species since 1996. The vaquita is at risk of extinction due to its small population size.

In 2019, the UNESCO World Heritage Site where the last vaquita are located was classified as a World Heritage Site in Danger.

The vaquita is also protected under the Endangered Species Act of 1973, the Mexican Official Standard NOM-059 (Norma Oficial Mexicana), and Appendix I of the Convention on International Trade in Endangered Species of Wild Fauna and Flora (CITES).

For a small population such as the vaquita to recover after a severe decline in population size is very difficult. This conservation status is strongly influenced in part of the species reproductive biology. The large number of unknowns surrounding the key reproductive parameters of the vaquita makes understanding its potential for recovery even harder.

=== Conservation efforts ===
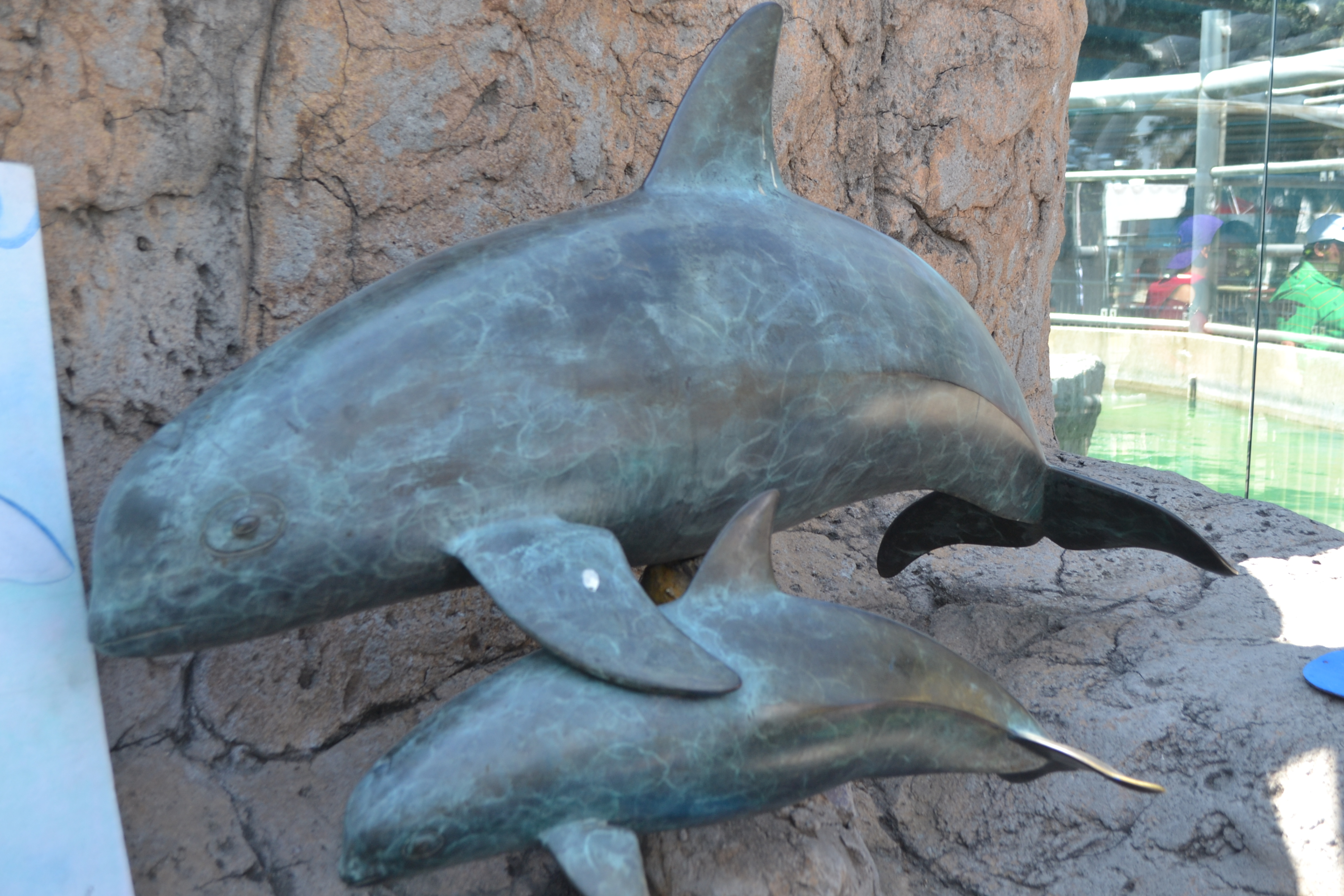
A statue of vaquitas in Mexico to promote their conservation

The vaquita is found only in the upper Gulf of California, Mexico area. Anthropogenic effects of a rise in commercial fishing such as accidental by-catch, illegal fishing, and entanglement have been linked to the cause of their decline. Shrimp fishing and gillnets create entanglement issues for the vaquita. Aspects of illegal fishing including open access fisheries and absent fisheries management have correlated towards poaching of the main prey source of the vaquita. The swim bladders of the Totoaba macdonaldi are being sold on the black market by cartels for profit.

The Mexican government, international committees, scientists, and conservation groups have recommended and implemented plans to help reduce the rate of bycatch, enforce gillnet bans, and promote population recovery.

Protection efforts throughout Mexico have taken place in order to preserve the population. In 2017, the Government of Mexico established it as a felony to remove an endangered species. Alongside this, the Government of Mexico also made a public agreement to prohibit gillnet use. Efforts are proactive in incentive applications to fisheries in a system of trade-offs that benefit fishermen and the vaquita.

Mexico launched a program in 2008 called PACE-VAQUITA in an effort to enforce the gillnet ban in the Biosphere Reserve, allow fishermen to swap their gillnets for vaquita-safe fishing gear, and provide economic support to fishermen for surrendering fishing permits and pursuing alternative livelihoods. Despite the progress made with legal fishermen, hundreds of poachers continued to fish in the exclusion zone. Poaching continues as the swim bladders of totoaba can sell for anywhere from $20,000 to upwards of $80,000, and they are often referred to as the "cocaine of the sea." A black market for totoaba swim bladders has developed fairly recently in China (including Hong Kong). In 2017, poachers received up to US$20,000 for a kilogram of totoaba swim bladders, with some making as much as $116,000 in one day.

The swim bladders of the Totoaba macdonaldi are being sold on the black market by cartel for profit. With continued illegal totoaba fishing, which is largely motivated by sales to the Chinese market where it is used in traditional medicine, and uncontrolled bycatch of vaquitas, the International Committee for the Recovery of the Vaquita (CIRVA) recommended that some vaquitas be removed from the high-density fishing area and be relocated to protected sea pens. This effort, called VaquitaCPR, captured two vaquitas in 2017; one was later released and the other died shortly after capture after both suffered from shock.

Local and international conservation groups, including Museo de Ballena and Sea Shepherd Conservation Society, are working with the Mexican Navy to detect fishing in the Refuge Area and remove illegal gillnets. In March 2020, the U.S. National Marine Fisheries Service (NMFS) announced a ban on imported Mexican shrimp and other seafood caught in vaquita habitat in the northern Gulf of California.

In response to the dire circumstances facing the vaquita as by-catch of the illegal totoaba trade, in 2017 Earth League International (ELI) commenced an investigation and intelligence gathering operation called Operation Fake Gold, during which the entire illicit totoaba maw (swim bladder) international supply chain, from Mexico to China, has been mapped and researched. Thanks to the confidential data that ELI shared with the Mexican authorities, in November 2020, a series of important arrests were made in Mexico.

To date, efforts have been unsuccessful in solving the complex socioeconomic and environmental issues that affect vaquita conservation and the greater Gulf of California ecosystem. Necessary action includes habitat protection, resource management, education, fisheries enforcement, alternative livelihoods for fishermen, and raising awareness of the vaquita and associated issues.

Jaramillo-Legorreta, et al. stated in 2007 that captive breeding programs were not a viable option for saving the species from extinction.

The Secretariat of Environment and Natural Resources (SEMARNAT) announced on February 27, 2021, that it may reduce the protected area for the vaquita in the Sea of Cortés as there are only ten of the porpoises left and it may never recuperate its historical range.

Beginning in July 2022, the Mexican government placed 193 concrete blocks in the Gulf of California no-tolerance zone, intended to allow the detection of nets by acoustic sonar and prevent further entrapment of vaquitas.

Creating protected areas is always an option for conservationists, but because the vaquita's range is so small, there would be no use in trying to establish habitat corridors. One option for conservationists could be trying to create buffer zones near the coast in which pesticides harmful to vaquitas are restricted or even unavailable in order to enhance the protection value of the vaquita's range.

In May 2023, a wildlife survey expedition discovered that the population had stabilized since it had last been recorded in 2021.

In October 2024, Colossal Biosciences announced their non-profit foundation dedicated to conservation of extant species, with one of their first projects being the vaquita. Colossal plans to biobank genetic material to revive the species if it were to become extinct, and to use acoustic sensors and drones to monitor vaquitas in collaboration with CONANP.

Roughly 80% of shrimp caught in the northern end of the Gulf of California, which has a high aquatic mammal bycatch rate, is consumed in the United States. As such, U.S. consumers of this shrimp are likely contributing to the vaquita extinction crisis. The Marine Mammal Protection Act of 1972, which forbids foreign fishers from exporting seafood with high levels of marine mammal bycatch, may allow for better efforts to preserve endangered vaquitas.

In 2024, the Mexican government announced a new agreement with Sea Shepherd aimed at increasing protection for the species.

== See also ==
- Baiji - Another critically endangered/functionally extinct cetacean in modern times
- Holocene extinction - Ongoing mass-extinction event consisting of manmade extinctions

== Sources ==
- Alberts, Elizabeth Claire (16 July 2021). "'Mismanaged to death': Mexico opens up sole vaquita habitat to fishing". Mongabay Environmental News.
- Aragón-Noriega, E. A.; Rodríguez-Quiroz, G.; Cisneros-Mata, M.A.; Ortega-Rubio, A. (13 October 2010). "Managing a protected marine area for the conservation of critically endangered vaquita (Phocoena sinus Norris, 1958) in the Upper Gulf of California". International Journal of Sustainable Development & World Ecology. 17 (5): 410–416. Bibcode:2010IJSDW..17..410A. doi:10.1080/13504509.2010.500823. S2CID 154832691 – via Taylor & Francis.
- "Mexico may reduce protection area for endangered porpoise". news.yahoo.com. The Associated Press. 27 February 2021.
- Brownell, Robert L. (October 1986). "Distribution of the Vaquita, Phocoena Sinus, in Mexican Waters". Marine Mammal Science. 2 (4): 299–305. Bibcode:1986MMamS...2..299B. doi:10.1111/j.1748-7692.1986.tb00137.x.
- Brownell, Robert L.; Findley, Lloyd T.; Vidal, Omar; Robles, Alejandro; et al. (1987). "External Morphology and Pigmentation of the Vaquita, Phocoena Sinus (cetacea: Mammalia)". Marine Mammal Science. 3 (1): 22–30. Bibcode:1987MMamS...3...22B. doi:10.1111/j.1748-7692.1987.tb00149.x. ISSN 1748-7692.
- Canon, Gabrielle (12 February 2022). "The tiny vaquita porpoise now numbers less than 10. Can they be saved?". The Guardian.
- Casanueva, Agustín B. Ávila (11 July 2020). "Secuenciar el genoma de la vaquita marina es la esperanza para su conservación". TecReview (in Mexican Spanish). Archived from the original on 15 August 2020.
- CIRVA (February 2019). "Report of the Eleventh meeting of the Comité Internacional para la Recuperación de la Vaquita (CIRVA)" (PDF). iucn-csg.org. Archived from the original (PDF) on 12 May 2019. "...analysis indicated that only about 10 vaquitas remained alive in 2018 (with a 95% chance of the true value being between 6 and 22)."
- CITES (23 February 2023). "Appendices I, II and III" (PDF). CITES. p. 14.
- Courchamp, Franck; Angulo, Elena; Rivalan, Philippe; Hall, Richard J.; Signoret, Laetitia; Bull, Leigh; Meinard, Yves (28 November 2006). "Rarity Value and Species Extinction: The Anthropogenic Allee Effect". PLOS Biology. 4 (12) e415. doi:10.1371/journal.pbio.0040415. ISSN 1545-7885. PMC 1661683. PMID 17132047.
- Delgado, Grace Peña (2012). Making the Chinese Mexican: Global Migration, Localism, and Exclusion in the U.S-Mexico Borderlands. Stanford University Press. ISBN 978-0-8047-7814-5.
- Díaz-Uribe, J. Gabriel; Arreguín-Sánchez, Francisco; Lercari-Bernier, Diego; Cruz-Escalona, Víctor H.; et al. (April 2012). "An integrated ecosystem trophic model for the North and Central Gulf of California: An alternative view for endemic species conservation". Ecological Modelling. 230: 73–91. Bibcode:2012EcMod.230...73D. doi:10.1016/j.ecolmodel.2012.01.009. ISSN 0304-3800.
- Dunch, Victoria (1 August 2019). "Saving the vaquita one bite at a time: The missing role of the shrimp consumer in vaquita conservation". Marine Pollution Bulletin. 145: 583–586. Bibcode:2019MarPB.145..583D. doi:10.1016/j.marpolbul.2019.06.043. ISSN 0025-326X. PMID 31590827. S2CID 198269466.
- "Phocoena sinus" – via fossilworks – Gateway to the Paleobiology Database.
- Hohn, A. A.; Read, A. J.; Fernandez, S.; Vidal, O.; Findley, L. T. (June 1996). "Life history of the vaquita, Phocoena sinus (Phocoenidae, Cetacea)". Journal of Zoology. 239 (2): 235–251. doi:10.1111/j.1469-7998.1996.tb05450.x. ISSN 0952-8369.
- Jaramillo-Legorreta, Armando M.; Cardenas-Hinojosa, Gustavo; Nieto-Garcia, Edwyna; Rojas-Bracho, Lorenzo; et al. (2019). "Decline towards extinction of Mexico's vaquita porpoise (Phocoena sinus)". Royal Society Open Science. 6 (7) 190598. Bibcode:2019RSOS....690598J. doi:10.1098/rsos.190598. PMC 6689580. PMID 31417757.
- Jaramillo-Legorreta, Armando; Rojas-Bracho, Lorenzo; Brownell, Robert L.; Read, Andrew J.; et al. (15 November 2007). "Saving the Vaquita: Immediate Action, Not More Data". Conservation Biology. 21 (6): 071117012342001––. Bibcode:2007ConBi..21.1653J. doi:10.1111/j.1523-1739.2007.00825.x. ISSN 0888-8892. PMID 18173491. S2CID 7034303.
- Jaramillo-Legorreta, Armando M.; Rojas-Bracho, Lorenzo; Gerrodette, Tim (1999). "A New Abundance Estimate for Vaquitas: First Step for Recovery". Marine Mammal Science. 15 (4): 957–973. Bibcode:1999MMamS..15..957J. doi:10.1111/j.1748-7692.1999.tb00872.x. ISSN 1748-7692.
- Lam, Su Shiung; Chew, Kit Wayne; Show, Pau Loke; Ma, Nyuk Ling; et al. (November 2020). "Environmental management of two of the world's most endangered marine and terrestrial predators: Vaquita and cheetah". Environmental Research. 190 109966. Bibcode:2020ER....19009966L. doi:10.1016/j.envres.2020.109966. ISSN 0013-9351. PMID 32829186. S2CID 221282339.
- Linares, Albinson (21 April 2023). "Mexico takes aim against marine animals' trafficking but criminal networks persist". NBC News.
- Marine Mammal Commission (2023). "The Economics of Marine Mammals". Marine Mammal Commission.
- McNamee, Gregory (11 April 2011). "Saying Adios to the Vaquita". Encyclopedia Britannica - Saving Earth.
- Morin, Phillip A.; Archer, Frederick I.; Avila, Catherine D.; Balacco, Jennifer R.; et al. (May 2021) [First published: 22 October 2020]. "Reference genome and demographic history of the most endangered marine mammal, the vaquita". Molecular Ecology Resources. 21 (4): 1008–1020. Bibcode:2021MolER..21.1008M. doi:10.1111/1755-0998.13284. ISSN 1755-098X. PMC 8247363. PMID 33089966.
- Morzaria-Luna, Hem Nalini; Ainsworth, Cameron H.; Kaplan, Isaac C.; Levin, Phillip S.; Fulton, Elizabeth A. (15 August 2012). Stergiou, Konstantinos I. (ed.). "Exploring Trade-Offs between Fisheries and Conservation of the Vaquita Porpoise (Phocoena sinus) Using an Atlantis Ecosystem Model". PLOS ONE. 7 (8) e42917. Bibcode:2012PLoSO...742917M. doi:10.1371/journal.pone.0042917. ISSN 1932-6203. PMC 3419746. PMID 22916180.
- Natural Resource Defense Council (4 March 2020). "U.S. Government Expands Mexican Seafood Ban to Save Vaquita Porpoise". NRDC.org.
- NOAA (30 January 2023). "Vaquita". NOAA Fisheries Species Directory.
- Norris, Kenneth S.; McFarland, William N. (20 February 1958). "A New Harbor Porpoise of the Genus Phocoena from the Gulf of California". Journal of Mammalogy. 39 (1): 22–39. Bibcode:1958JMamm..39...22N. doi:10.2307/1376606. ISSN 0022-2372. JSTOR 1376606.
- Pennisi, Elizabeth (November 2017). "Update: After death of captured vaquita, conservationists call off rescue effort".
- Pimm, Stuart L. (2023). "Conservation - ecology". Encyclopedia Britannica. Which species are most vulnerable to extinction.
- Rafferty, John P. (2023a). "K-selected species". Encyclopedia Britannica.
- Rafferty, John (2023b). "The Plight of the Vaquita". Encyclopedia Britannica - Saving Earth.
- Robinson, Jacqueline A.; Kyriazis, Christopher C.; Nigenda-Morales, Sergio F.; Beichman, Annabel C.; Rojas-Bracho, Lorenzo; Robertson, Kelly M.; Fontaine, Michael C.; Wayne, Robert K.; Lohmueller, Kirk E.; Taylor, Barbara L.; Morin, Phillip A. (6 May 2022). "The critically endangered vaquita is not doomed to extinction by inbreeding depression". Science. 376 (6593): 635–639. Bibcode:2022Sci...376..635R. doi:10.1126/science.abm1742. ISSN 0036-8075. PMC 9881057. PMID 35511971. S2CID 248542094.
- Rojas-Bracho, L; Gulland, FMD; Smith, CR; Taylor, B; et al. (11 January 2019). "A field effort to capture critically endangered vaquitas Phocoena sinus for protection from entanglement in illegal gillnets". Endangered Species Research. 38: 11–27. Bibcode:2019ESRes..38...11R. doi:10.3354/esr00931. ISSN 1863-5407.
- Rojas-Bracho, Lorenzo; Reeves, Randall R. (3 July 2013). "Vaquitas and gillnets: Mexico's ultimate cetacean conservation challenge" (PDF). Endangered Species Research. 21 (1): 77–87. Bibcode:2013ESRes..21...77R. doi:10.3354/esr00501. ISSN 1863-5407.
- Rojas-Bracho, Lorenzo; Reeves, Randall R.; Jaramillo-Legorreta, Armando (2006). "Conservation of the vaquita Phocoena sinus". Mammal Review. 36 (3): 179–216. Bibcode:2006MamRv..36..179R. doi:10.1111/j.1365-2907.2006.00088.x. ISSN 1365-2907.
- Rojas-Bracho, Lorenzo; Taylor, Barbara (1 August 2021). "Vaquita". iucn-csg.org. IUCN – SSC Cetacean Specialist Group.
- Rojas-Bracho, L.; Taylor, B.L.; Jaramillo-Legorreta, A. (2022). "Phocoena sinus". IUCN Red List of Threatened Species. 2022 e.T17028A214541137. doi:10.2305/IUCN.UK.2022-1.RLTS.T17028A214541137.en.
- Sanjurjo-Rivera, Enrique; Mesnick, Sarah L.; Ávila-Forcada, Sara; Poindexter, Oriana; Lent, Rebecca; Felbab-Brown, Vanda; Cisneros-Montemayor, Andrés M.; Squires, Dale; Sumaila, U. Rashid; Munro, Gordon; Ortiz-Rodriguez, Rafael; Rodriguez, Ramses; Sainz, Jade F. (2021). "An Economic Perspective on Policies to Save the Vaquita: Conservation Actions, Wildlife Trafficking, and the Structure of Incentives". Frontiers in Marine Science. 8 644022. Bibcode:2021FrMaS...844022S. doi:10.3389/fmars.2021.644022. ISSN 2296-7745.
- Setiawati, Ety; Rahayu, Hanum Mukti; Setiadi, Anandita Eka (2017). "Pengembangan Media Pembelajaran Modul Pada Materi Animalia Kelas X Sman 1 Pontianak". Jurnal Bioeducation (in Indonesian). 4 (1). doi:10.29406/522. ISSN 2527-6522.
- Taylor, Barbara L.; Wells, Randall S.; Olson, Paula A.; Brownell, Robert L.; et al. (2019). "Likely annual calving in the vaquita, Phocoena sinus: A new hope?". Marine Mammal Science. 35 (4): 1603–1612. Bibcode:2019MMamS..35.1603T. doi:10.1111/mms.12595. ISSN 1748-7692. S2CID 91403217.
- Torre, Jorge; Vidal, Omar; Brownell, Robert L. (October 2014). "Sexual dimorphism and developmental patterns in the external morphology of the vaquita, Phocoena sinus". Marine Mammal Science. 30 (4): 1285–1296. Bibcode:2014MMamS..30.1285T. doi:10.1111/mms.12106.
- VaquitaCPR (2019). "Rescue Efforts". VaquitaCPR.org.
- World Wildlife Fund. "Vaquita | Species | WWF".
- "The last eight vaquitas in the Gulf of California are to be saved". The Yucatan Times. 9 October 2022.
