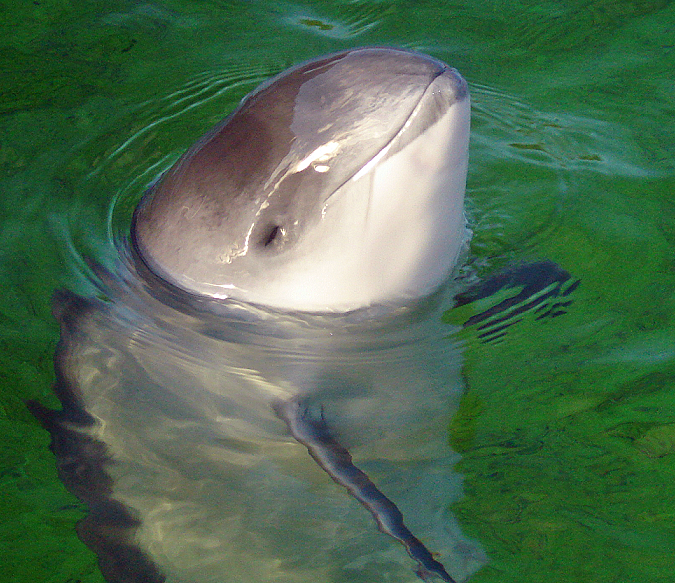
- A harbour porpoise (Phocoena phocoena)

Scientific classification
- Kingdom: Animalia
- Phylum: Chordata
- Class: Mammalia
- Order: Artiodactyla
- Infraorder: Cetacea
- Family: Phocoenidae
- Genus: Phocoena; Cuvier, 1816

Type species
- Delphinus phocoena Linnaeus, 1758

Species
- Phocoena dioptrica Phocoena phocoena Phocoena sinus Phocoena spinipinnis
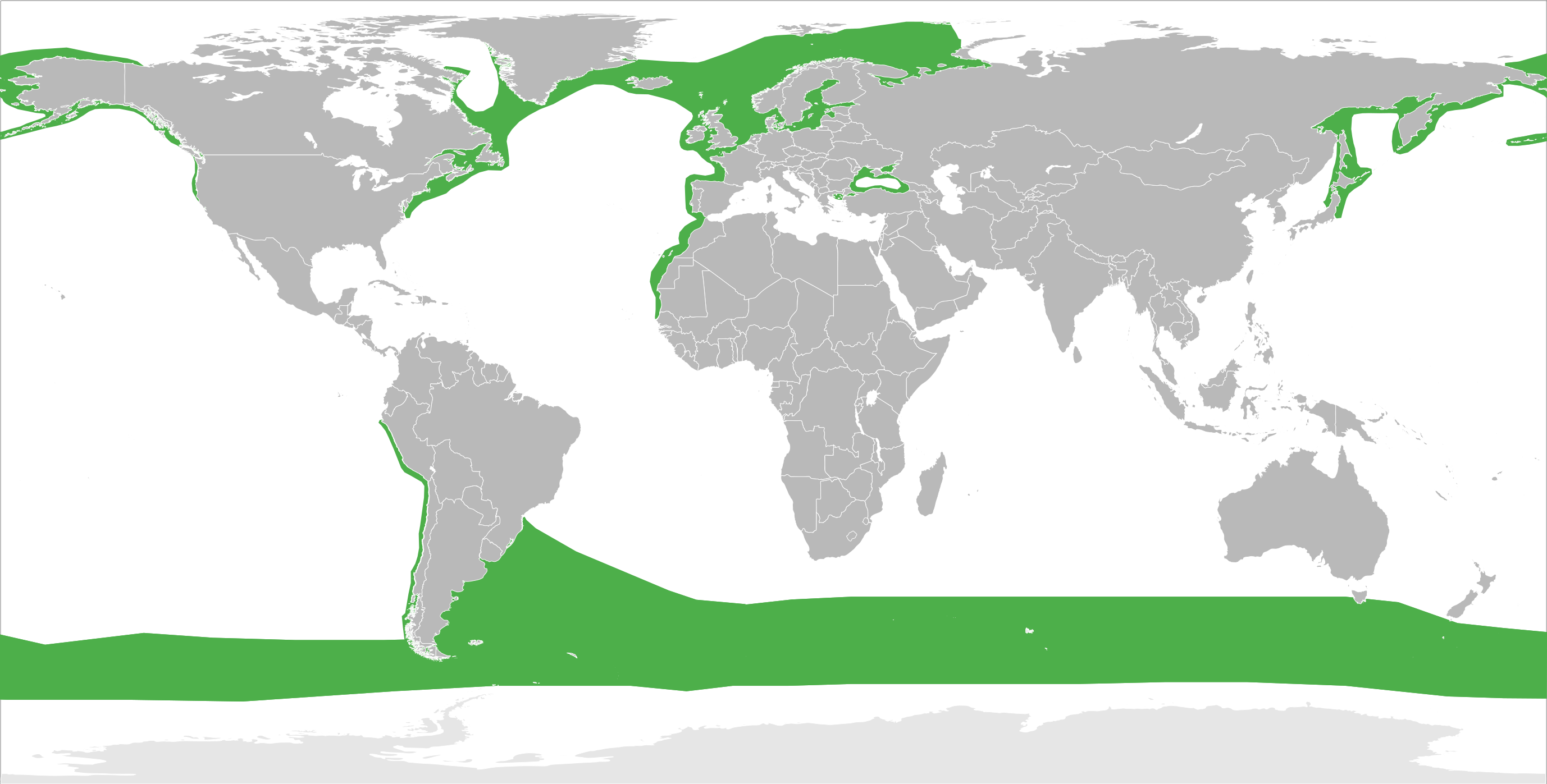
- Phocoenidae distribution

= Phocoena =

Phocoena Temporal range: Miocene-recent

Genus of mammals

Phocoena is a genus of porpoises with four extant species.

Image	Scientific name	Common name	Distribution
	Phocoena dioptrica	Spectacled porpoise	circumpolar in cool sub-Antarctic and low Antarctic waters
	Phocoena phocoena	Harbour porpoise	cooler coastal waters of the North Atlantic, North Pacific and the Black Sea
	Phocoena sinus	Vaquita	northern area of the Gulf of California, or Sea of Cortez
	Phocoena spinipinnis	Burmeister's porpoise	coast of South America
