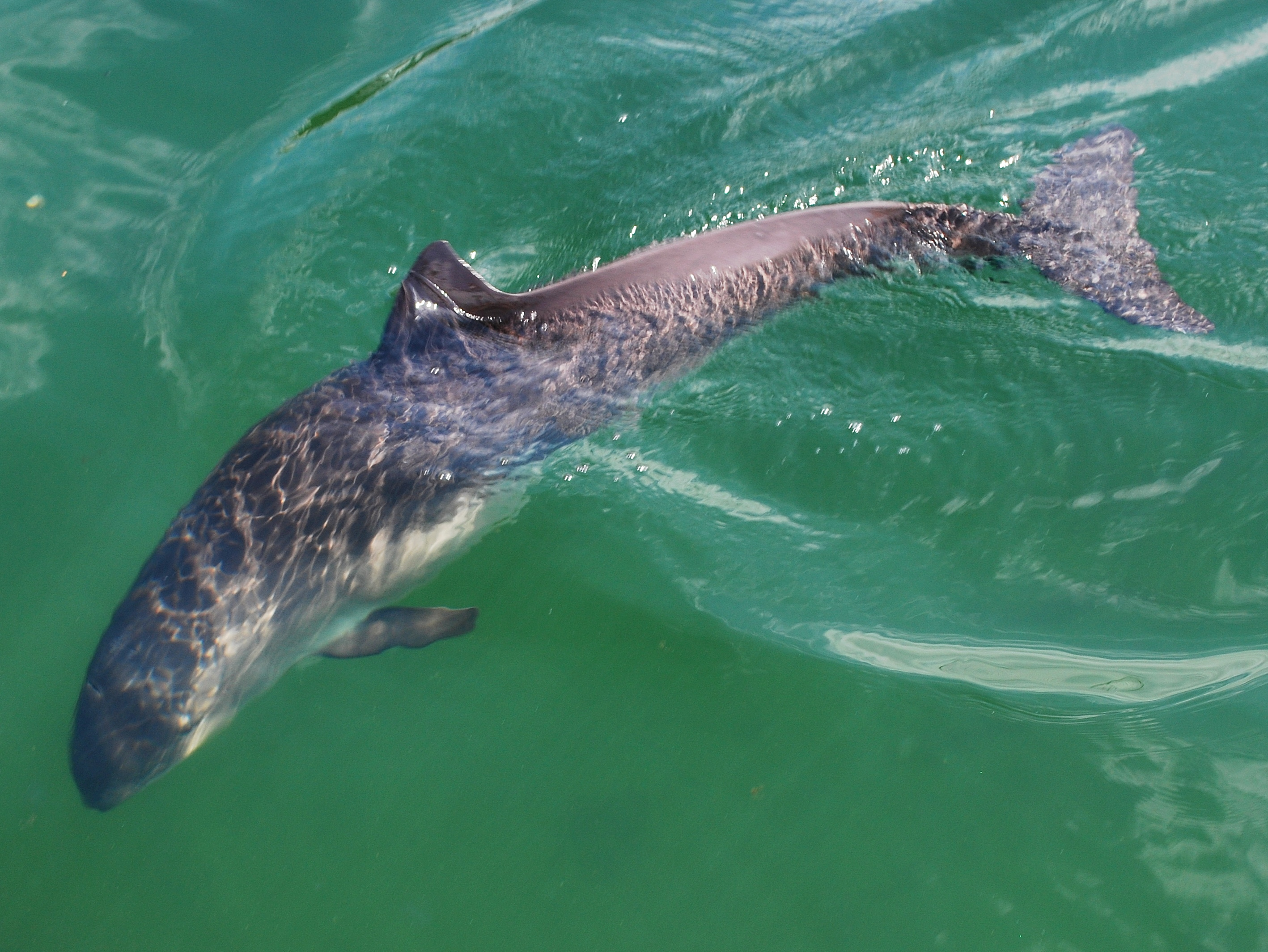
- The harbor porpoise (Phocoena phocoena)

Scientific classification
- Kingdom: Animalia
- Phylum: Chordata
- Class: Mammalia
- Order: Artiodactyla
- Infraorder: Cetacea
- Superfamily: Delphinoidea
- Family: Phocoenidae; Gray, 1825

Type genus
- Phocoena Cuvier, 1816

Genera
- See text
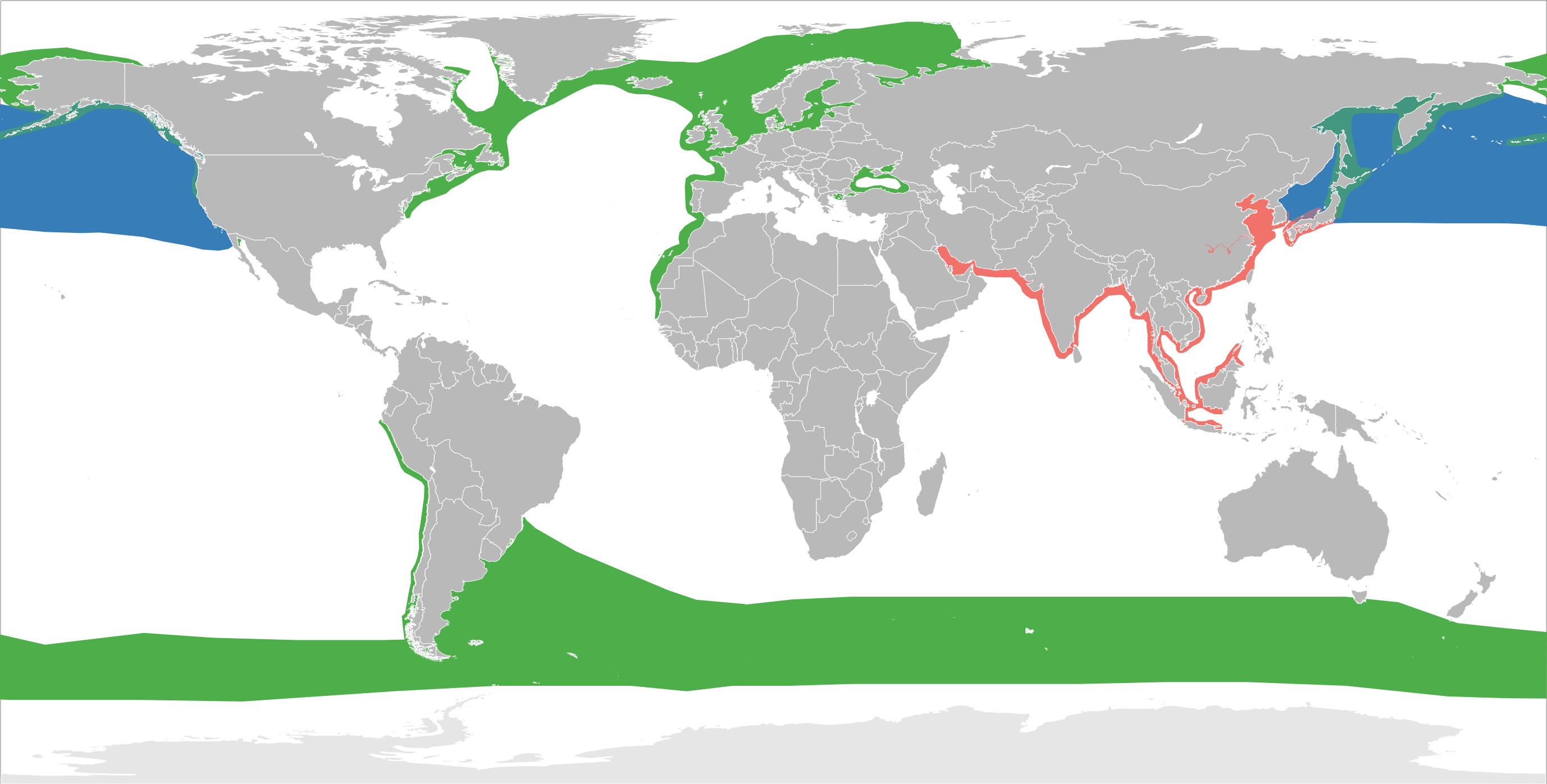
- Phocoenidae distribution Phocoena in green, Neophocaena in red, Phocoenoides in blue

= Porpoise =

Porpoise Temporal range: 15.970–0 Ma Miocene to Recent

Small cetacean of the family Phocoenidae

Porpoises (/ˈpɔːrpəsɪz/) are small dolphin-like cetaceans classified under the family Phocoenidae. Although similar in appearance to dolphins, they are more closely related to narwhals and belugas. There are eight extant species of porpoise, all among the smallest of the toothed whales. Porpoises are distinguished from dolphins by their flattened, spade-shaped teeth distinct from the conical teeth of dolphins, and lack of a pronounced beak, although some dolphins (e.g. Hector's dolphin) also lack a pronounced beak. Porpoises, and other cetaceans, belong to the clade Cetartiodactyla with even-toed ungulates.

Porpoises range in size from the vaquita, at 1.4 metres (4 feet 7 inches) in length and 54 kilograms (119 pounds) in weight, to the Dall's porpoise, at 2.3 m (7 ft 7 in) and 220 kg (490 lb). Several species exhibit sexual dimorphism in that the females are larger than males. They have streamlined bodies and two limbs that are modified into flippers. Porpoises use echolocation as their primary sensory system. Some species are well adapted for diving to great depths. Like all cetaceans, they have a layer of fat, or blubber, under the skin to keep them warm in cold water.

Porpoises are abundant and found in a multitude of environments, including rivers (finless porpoise), coastal and shelf waters (harbour porpoise, vaquita) and open ocean (Dall's porpoise and spectacled porpoise), covering all water temperatures from tropical (Sea of Cortez, vaquita) to polar (Greenland, harbour porpoise). Porpoises feed largely on fish and squid, much like the rest of the odontocetes. Little is known about reproductive behaviour. Females may have one calf every year under favourable conditions. Calves are typically born in the spring and summer months and remain dependent on the female until the following spring. Porpoises produce ultrasonic clicks, which are used for both navigation (echolocation) and social communication. In contrast to many dolphin species, porpoises do not form large social groups.

Porpoises were, and still are, hunted by some countries by means of drive hunting. Larger threats to porpoises include extensive bycatch in gill nets, competition for food from fisheries, and marine pollution, in particular heavy metals and organochlorides. The vaquita is nearly extinct due to bycatch in gill nets, with a predicted population of fewer than a dozen individuals. Since the extinction of the baiji, the vaquita is considered the most endangered cetacean. Some species of porpoises have been and are kept in captivity and trained for research, education and public display.

== Taxonomy and evolution ==
Porpoises, along with whales and dolphins, are descendants of land-living ungulates (hoofed animals) that first entered the oceans around 50 million years ago (Mya). During the Miocene (23 to 5 Mya), mammals were fairly modern, meaning they seldom changed physiologically from the time. The cetaceans diversified, and fossil evidence suggests porpoises and dolphins diverged from their last common ancestor around 15 Mya. The oldest fossils are known from the shallow seas around the North Pacific, with animals spreading to the European coasts and Southern Hemisphere only much later, during the Pliocene.

- ORDER Artiodactyla
  - Infraorder Cetacea
    - Parvorder Odontoceti toothed whales
      - Superfamily Delphinoidea
        - Family Phocoenidae – porpoises
          - Genus †Australitha
            - A. intermedia
          - Genus †Haborophocoena
            - H. toyoshimai
          - Genus †Lomacetus
            - L. ginsburgi
          - Genus Neophocaena
            - N. phocaeniodes – Indo-Pacific finless porpoise
            - N. sunameri – East Asian finless porpoise
            - N. asiaeorientalis – Yangtze finless porpoise
          - Genus †Numataphocoena
            - N. yamashitai
          - Genus Phocoena
            - P. phocoena – harbour porpoise
            - P. sinus – vaquita
            - P. dioptrica – spectacled porpoise
            - P. spinipinnis – Burmeister's porpoise
          - Genus Phocoenoides
            - P. dalli – Dall's porpoise
          - Genus †Semirostrum
            - S. ceruttii
          - Genus †Septemtriocetus
            - S. bosselaersii
          - Genus †Piscolithax
            - P. aenigmaticus
            - P. longirostris
            - P. boreios
            - P. tedfordi

Phylogenetic analyses indicate Neophocaena as a basal group to the genus Phocoena but that the latter is paraphyletic, as Dall's porpoise and harbour porpoise consistently appear as sister species. A close relationship between the two latter species is further supported by documented hybrids between male harbour porpoises and female Dall's porpoises.

== Biology ==
=== Anatomy ===
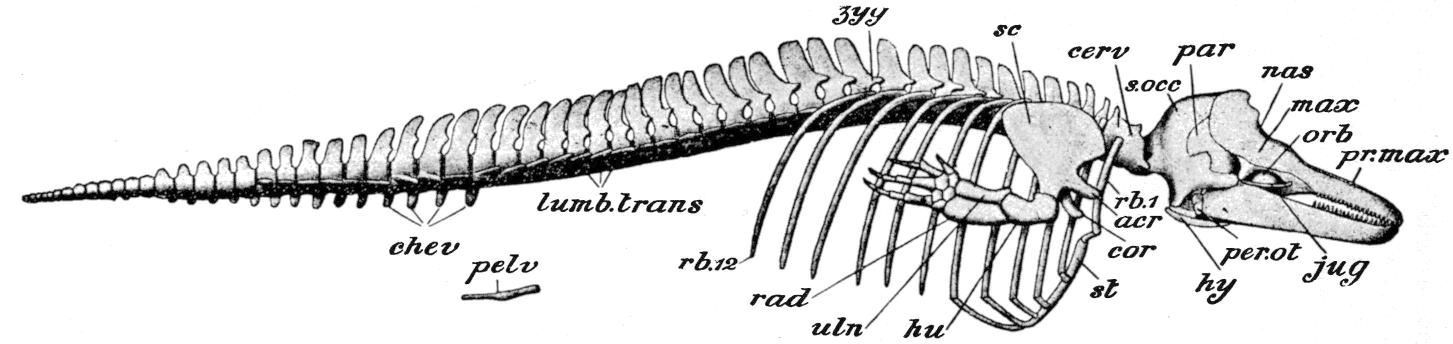
Harbour porpoise skeleton

Porpoises have a bulbous head, no external ear flaps, a non-flexible neck, a torpedo shaped body, limbs modified into flippers, and a tail fin. Their skull has small eye orbits, small, blunt snouts, and eyes placed on the sides of the head. Porpoises range in size from the 1.4 m (4 ft 7 in) and 54 kg (119 lb) vaquita to the 2.3 m (7 ft 7 in) and 220 kg (490 lb) Dall's porpoise. Overall, they tend to be dwarfed by other cetaceans. Almost all species have female-biased sexual dimorphism, with the females being larger than the males, although those physical differences are generally small; one exception is Dall's porpoise.

Odontocetes possess teeth with cementum cells overlying dentine cells. Unlike human teeth, which are composed mostly of enamel on the portion of the tooth outside of the gum, whale teeth have cementum outside the gum. Porpoises have a three-chambered stomach, including a fore-stomach and fundic and pyloric chambers. Porpoises, like other odontocetes, possess only one blowhole. Breathing involves expelling stale air from the blowhole, forming an upward, steamy spout, followed by inhaling fresh air into the lungs. All porpoises have a thick layer of blubber. This blubber can help with insulation from the harsh underwater climate, protection to some extent as predators would have a hard time getting through a thick layer of fat, and energy for leaner times. Calves are born with only a thin layer of blubber, but rapidly gain a thick layer from the milk, which has a very high fat content.

=== Locomotion ===
Porpoises have two flippers on the front and a tail fin. Their flippers contain four digits. Although porpoises do not possess fully developed hind limbs, they possess discrete rudimentary appendages, which may contain feet and digits. Porpoises are fast swimmers in comparison to seals, which typically cruise at 9–28 km/h (5–15 kn). The fusing of the neck vertebrae, while increasing stability when swimming at high speeds, decreases flexibility, making it impossible for them to turn their head. When swimming, they move their tail fin and lower body up and down, propelling themselves through vertical movement, while their flippers are mainly used for steering. Flipper movement is continuous. Some species log out of the water, which may allow them to travel faster, and sometimes they porpoise out of the water, meaning jump out of the water. Their skeletal anatomy allows them to be fast swimmers. They have a very well defined and triangular dorsal fin with the exception of finless porpoises, allowing them to steer better in the water. Unlike their dolphin counterparts, they are adapted for coastal shores, bays, and estuaries.

=== Senses ===
Biosonar by cetaceans

The porpoise ear has specific adaptations to the marine environment. In humans, the middle ear works as an impedance equaliser between the outside air's low impedance and the cochlear fluid's high impedance. In whales, and other marine mammals, there is no great difference between the outer and inner environments. Instead of sound passing through the outer ear to the middle ear, porpoises receive sound through the throat, from which it passes through a low-impedance fat-filled cavity to the inner ear. The porpoise ear is acoustically isolated from the skull by air-filled sinus pockets, which allow for greater directional hearing underwater. Odontocetes send out high frequency clicks from an organ known as a melon. This melon consists of fat, and the skull of any such creature containing a melon will have a large depression. The large bulge on top of the porpoises head is caused by the melon.

The porpoise eye is relatively small for its size, yet they do retain a good degree of eyesight. As well as this, the eyes of a porpoise are placed on the sides of its head, so their vision consists of two fields, rather than a binocular view like humans have. When porpoises surface, their lens and cornea correct the nearsightedness that results from the refraction of light; their eyes contain both rod and cone cells, meaning they can see in both dim and bright light. Porpoises do, however, lack short wavelength sensitive visual pigments in their cone cells indicating a more limited capacity for colour vision than most mammals. Most porpoises have slightly flattened eyeballs, enlarged pupils (which shrink as they surface to prevent damage), slightly flattened corneas and a tapetum lucidum; these adaptations allow for large amounts of light to pass through the eye and, therefore, they are able to form a very clear image of the surrounding area.

The olfactory lobes are absent in porpoises, suggesting that they have no sense of smell.

Porpoises are not thought to have a good sense of taste, as their taste buds are atrophied or missing altogether. However, some have preferences between different kinds of fish, indicating some sort of attachment to taste.

=== Sleep ===
Unlike most animals, porpoises are conscious breathers. All mammals sleep, but porpoises cannot afford to become unconscious for long because they may drown. While knowledge of sleep in wild cetaceans is limited, porpoises in captivity have been recorded to sleep with one side of their brain at a time, so that they may swim, breathe consciously, and avoid both predators and social contact during their period of rest.

== Behaviour ==
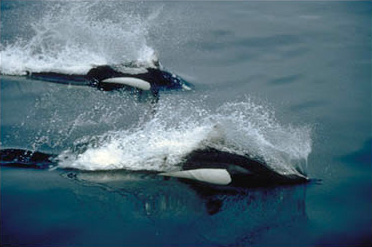
"Rooster tail" spray around swimming Dall's porpoises

=== Life cycle ===
Porpoises are fully aquatic creatures. Females deliver a single calf after a gestation period lasting about a year. Calving takes place entirely under water, with the foetus positioned for tail-first delivery to help prevent drowning. Females have mammary glands, but the shape of a newborn calf's mouth does not allow it to obtain a seal around the nipple—instead of the calf sucking milk, the mother squirts milk into the calf's mouth. This milk contains high amounts of fat, which aids in the development of blubber; it contains so much fat that it has the consistency of toothpaste. The calves are weaned at about 11 months of age. Males play no part in rearing calves. The calf is dependent for one to two years, and maturity occurs after seven to ten years, all varying between species. This mode of reproduction produces few offspring, but increases the probability of each one surviving.

=== Diet ===
Porpoises eat a wide variety of creatures. The stomach contents of harbour porpoises suggests that they mainly feed on benthic fish, and sometimes pelagic fish. They may also eat benthic invertebrates. In rare cases, algae, such as Ulva lactuca, is consumed. Atlantic porpoises are thought to follow the seasonal migration of bait fish, like herring, and their diet varies between seasons. The stomach contents of Dall's porpoises reveal that they mainly feed on cephalopods and bait fish, like capelin and sardines. Their stomachs also contained some deep-sea benthic organisms.

The finless porpoise is known to also follow seasonal migrations. It is known that populations in the mouth of the Indus River migrate to the sea from April through October to feed on the annual spawning of prawns. In Japan, sightings of small pods of them herding sand lance onto shore are common year-round.

Little is known about the diets of other species of porpoises. A dissection of three Burmeister's porpoises shows that they consume shrimp and euphausiids (krill). A dissection of a beached Vaquita showed remains of squid and grunts. Nothing is known about the diet of the spectacled porpoise.

== Interactions with humans ==
=== Research history ===
The tube in the head, through which this kind fish takes its breath and spitting water, located in front of the brain and ends outwardly in a simple hole, but inside it is divided by a downward bony septum, as if it were two nostrils; but underneath it opens up again in the mouth in a void.

— John Ray, 1671, the earliest description of cetacean airways

In Aristotle's time, the 4th century BCE, porpoises were regarded as fish due to their superficial similarity. Aristotle, however, could already see many physiological and anatomical similarities with the terrestrial vertebrates, such as blood (circulation), lungs, uterus and fin anatomy. His detailed descriptions were assimilated by the Romans, but mixed with a more accurate knowledge of the dolphins, as mentioned by Pliny the Elder in his "Natural history". In the art of this and subsequent periods, porpoises are portrayed with a long snout (typical of dolphins) and a high-arched head. The harbour porpoise was one of the most accessible species for early cetologists, because it could be seen very close to land, inhabiting shallow coastal areas of Europe. Much of the findings that apply to all cetaceans were first discovered in porpoises. One of the first anatomical descriptions of the airways of the whales on the basis of a harbor porpoise dates from 1671 by John Ray. It nevertheless referred to the porpoise as a fish, most likely not in the modern-day sense, where it refers to a zoological group, but the older reference as simply a creature of the sea (cf. for example star-fish, cuttle-fish, jelly-fish and whale-fish).

=== In captivity ===
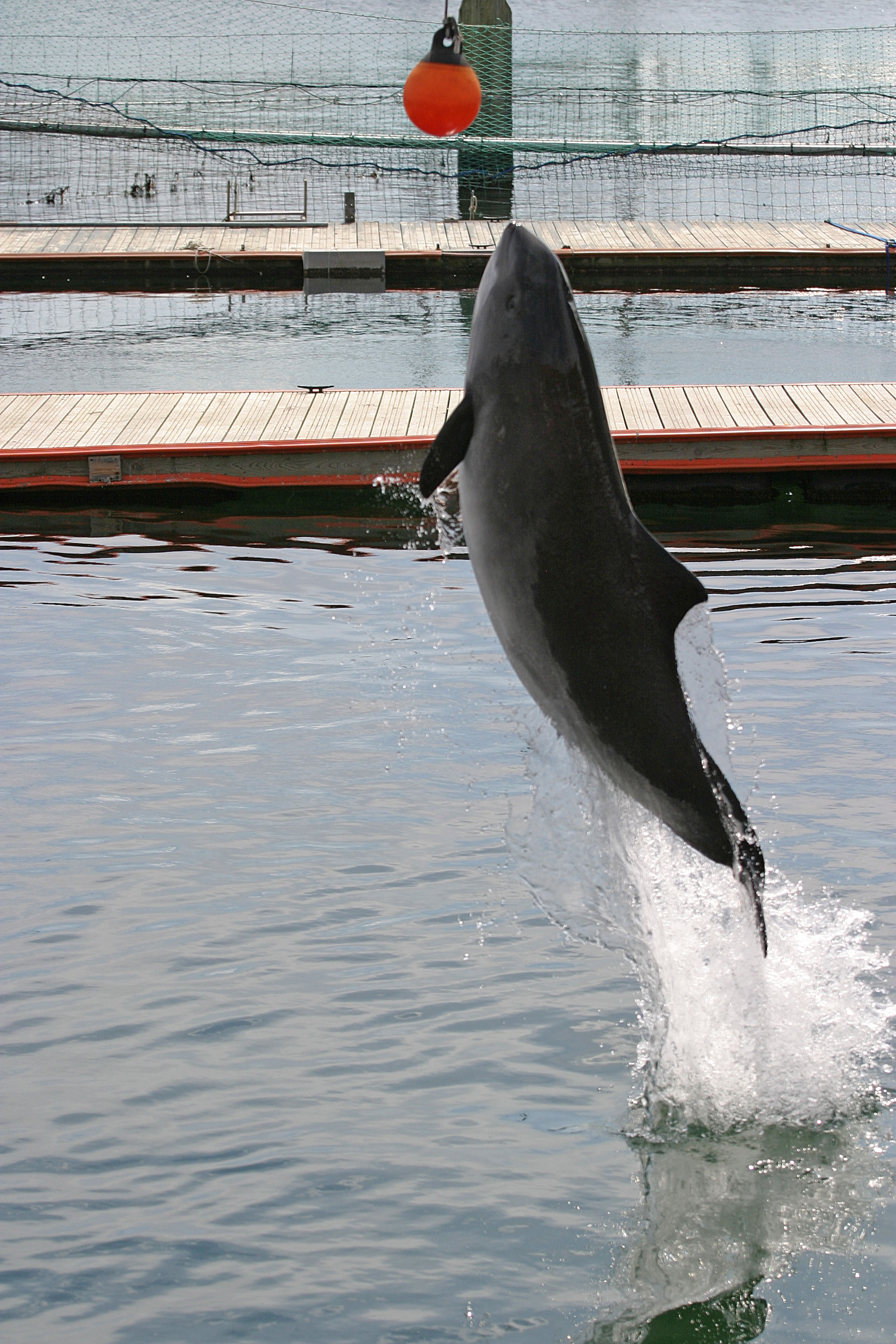
Harbour porpoise in captivity

Harbour porpoises have historically been kept in captivity, under the assumption that they would fare better than their dolphin counterparts due to their smaller size and shallow-water habitats. Up until the 1980s, they were consistently short-lived. Harbour porpoises have a very long captive history, with poorly documented attempts as early as the 15th century, and better documented starting in the 1860s and 1870s in London Zoo, the now-closed Brighton Aquarium & Dolphinarium, and a zoo in Germany. At least 150 harbour porpoises have been kept worldwide, but only about 20 were actively caught for captivity. The captive history is best documented from Denmark where about 100 harbour porpoises have been kept, most in the 1960s and 1970s. All but two were incidental catches in fishing nets or strandings. Nearly half of these died within a month of diseases caught before they were captured or from damage sustained during capture. Up until 1984, none lived for more than 14 months. Attempts to rehabilitate seven rescued individuals in 1986 only resulted in three that could be released 6 months later. Very few have been brought into captivity later, but they have lived considerably longer. In recent decades, the only place keeping the species in Denmark is the Fjord & Bælt Centre, where three rescues have been kept, along with their offspring. Among the three rescues, one (father of world's first harbour porpoise born in captivity) lived for 20 years in captivity, another for 15 years, while the third (mother of first born in captivity) is the world's oldest known harbour porpoise, being 31 years old in 2026. The typical age reached in the wild is 14 years or less. Very few harbour porpoises have been born in captivity. Historically, harbour porpoises were often kept singly and those who were together often were not mature or of the same sex. Disregarding one born more than 100 years ago that was the result of a pregnant female being brought into captivity, the world's first full captive breeding was in 2007 in the Fjord & Bælt Centre, followed by another in 2009 in the Dolfinarium Harderwijk, the Netherlands. In addition to the few kept in Europe, harbour porpoise were displayed at the Vancouver Aquarium (Canada) until recently. This was a female that had beached herself onto Horseshoe Bay in 2008 and a male that had done the same in 2011. They died in 2017 and 2016 respectively.

Finless porpoises have commonly been kept in Japan, as well as China and Indonesia. As of 1984, ninety-four in total had been in captivity in Japan, eleven in China, and at least two in Indonesia. As of 1986, three establishments in Japan had bred them, and there had been five recorded births. Three calves died moments after their birth, but two survived for several years. This breeding success, combined with the results with harbour porpoise in Denmark and the Netherlands, proved that porpoises can be successfully bred in captivity, and this could open up new conservation options. The reopened Miyajima Public Aquarium (Japan) houses three finless porpoises. As part of an attempt of saving the narrow-ridged (or Yangtze) finless porpoise, several are kept in the Baiji Dolphinarium in China. After having been kept in captivity for 9 years, the first breeding happened in 2005.

Small numbers of Dall's porpoises have been kept in captivity in both the United States and Japan, with the most recent being in the 1980s. The first recorded instance of a Dall's taken for an aquarium was in 1956 captured off Catalina Island in southern California. Dall's porpoises consistently failed to thrive in captivity. These animals often repeatedly ran into the walls of their enclosures, refused food, and exhibited skin sloughing. Almost all Dall's porpoises introduced to aquaria died shortly after, typically within days. Only two have lived for more than 60 days: a male reached 15 months at Marineland of the Pacific and another 21 months at a United States Navy facility.

As part of last-ditch effort of saving the extremely rare vaquita (the tiny remaining population is rapidly declining because of bycatch in gillnets), there have been attempts of transferring some to captivity. The first and only caught for captivity were two females in 2017. Both became distressed and were rapidly released, but one of them died in the process. Soon after the project was abandoned.

Only a single Burmeister's porpoise and a single spectacled porpoise have been kept in captivity. Both were stranded individuals that only survived a few days after their rescue.

=== Threats ===
==== Hunting ====
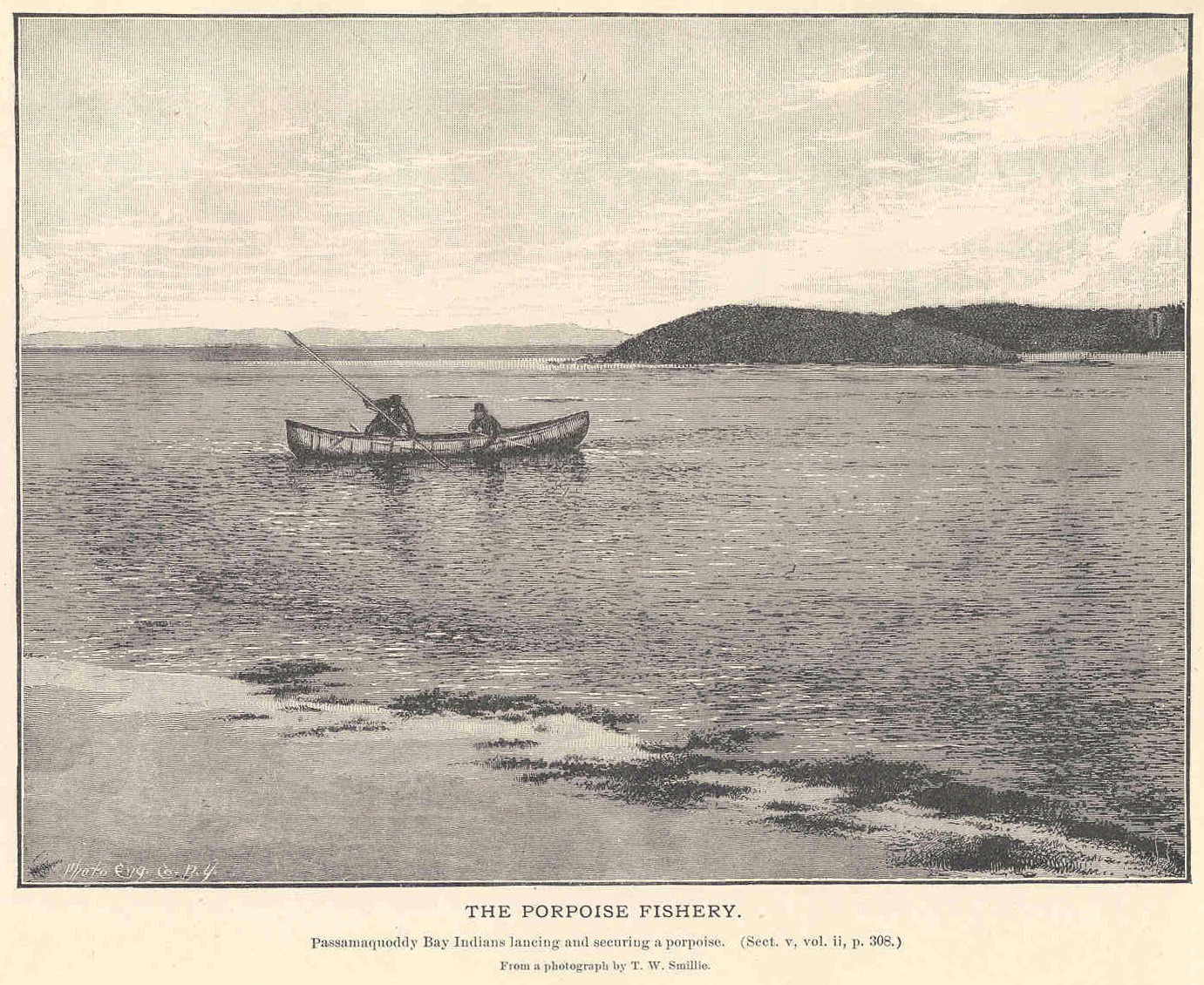
Traditional catch of harbour porpoise by lancing in Bay of Fundy

Porpoises and other smaller cetaceans have traditionally been hunted in many areas, at least in Asia, Europe and North America, for their meat and blubber. A dominant hunting technique is drive hunting, where a pod of animals is driven together with boats and usually into a bay or onto a beach. Their escape is prevented by closing off the route to the ocean with other boats or nets. This type of fishery for harbour porpoises is best documented from the Little Belt in the Danish Straits, where hunting was regulated by a guild for 400 years, until it was no longer profitable by the end of the 19th century (the guild was liquified in 1898). However, the hunt was resumed briefly during World War I and World War II due to fuel shortage. The Inuit in the Arctic hunt harbour porpoises by shooting and drive hunt for Dall's porpoise still takes place in Japan. The number of individuals taken each year is in the thousands, although a quota of around 17,000 per year is in effect today making it the largest direct hunt of any cetacean species in the world and the sustainability of the hunt has been questioned.

==== Fishing ====
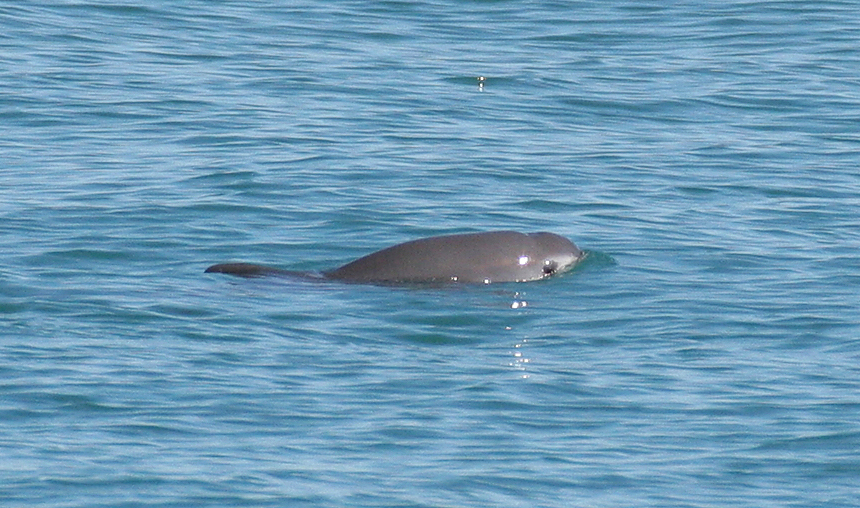
A vaquita swimming in the Gulf of California.

Porpoises are highly affected by bycatch. Many porpoises, mainly the vaquita, are subject to great mortality due to gillnetting. Although it is the world's most endangered marine cetacean, the vaquita continues to be caught in small-mesh gillnet fisheries throughout much of its range. Incidental mortality caused by the fleet of El Golfo de Santa Clara was estimated to be at around 39 vaquitas per year, which is over 17% of the population size. Harbour porpoises also suffer drowning by gillnetting, but on a less threatening scale due to their high population; their mortality rate per year increases a mere 5% due to this.

The fishing market, historically has always had a porpoise bycatch. Today, the Marine Mammal Protection Act of 1972 has enforced the use of safer fishing equipment to reduce bycatch.

==== Environmental hazards ====
Porpoises are very sensitive to anthropogenic disturbances, and are keystone species, which can indicate the overall health of the marine environment. Populations of harbor porpoises in the North and Baltic Seas are under increasing pressure from anthropogenic causes such as offshore construction, ship traffic, fishing, and military exercises. Increasing pollution is a serious problem for marine mammals. Heavy metals and plastic waste are not biodegradable, and sometimes cetaceans consume these hazardous materials, mistaking them for food items. As a result, the animals are more susceptible to diseases and have fewer offspring. Harbour porpoises from the English Channel were found to have accumulated heavy metals.

The military and geologists employ strong sonar and produce an increases in noise in the oceans. Marine mammals that make use of biosonar for orientation and communication are not only hindered by the extra noise, but may race to the surface in panic. This may lead to a bubbling out of blood gases, and the animal then dies because the blood vessels become blocked, so-called decompression sickness. This effect, of course, only occurs in porpoises that dive to great depths, such as Dall's porpoise.

Additionally, civilian vessels produce sonar waves to measure the depth of the body of water in which they are. Similar to the navy, some boats produce waves that attract porpoises, while others may repel them. The problem with the waves that attract is that the animal may be injured or even killed by being hit by the vessel or its propeller.

=== Conservation ===
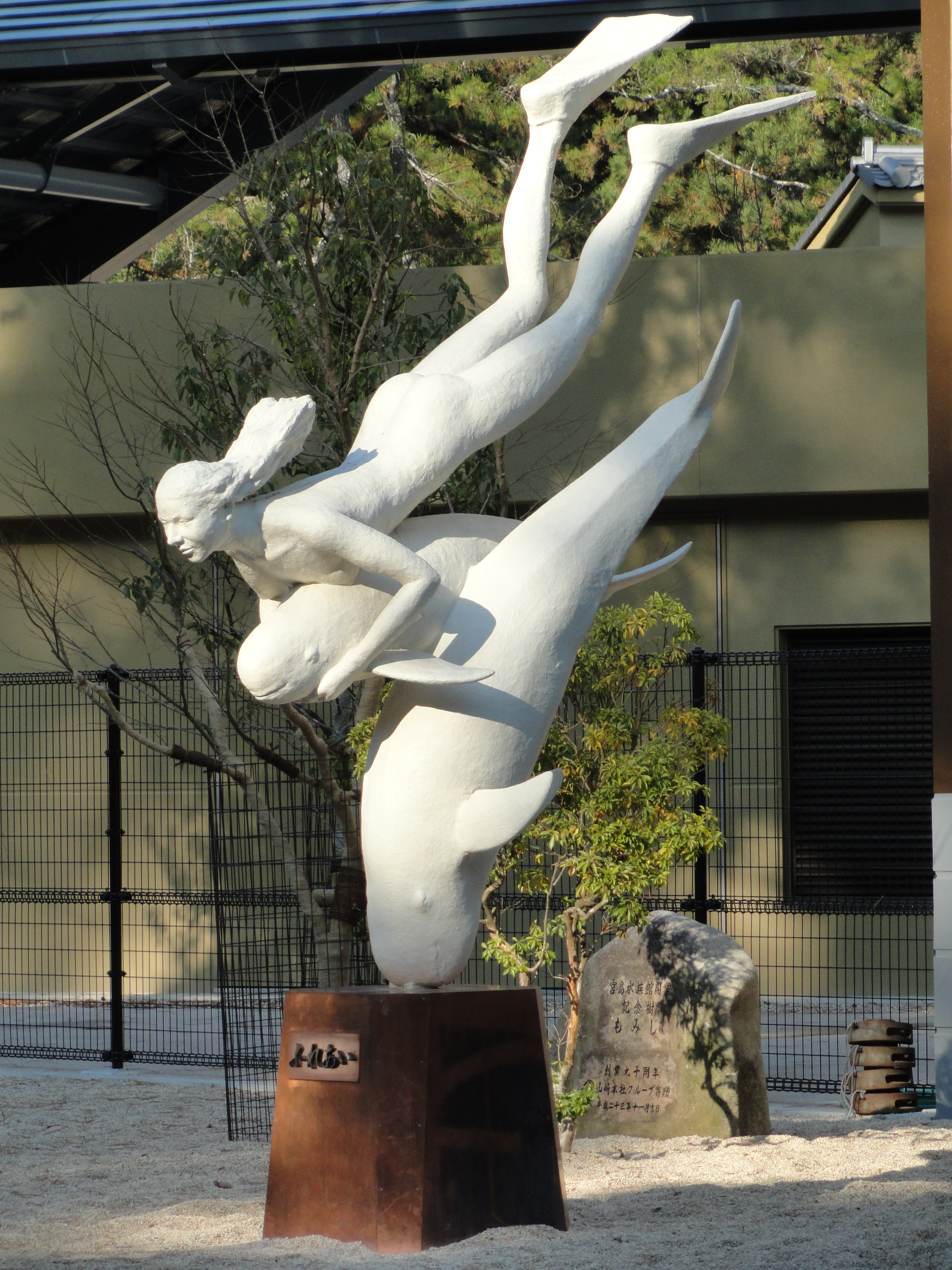
A porpoise sculpture at the Miyajima Public Aquarium, Japan.

The harbour porpoise, spectacled porpoise, Burmeister's porpoise, and Dall's porpoise are all listed on Appendix II of the Convention on the Conservation of Migratory Species of Wild Animals (CMS). In addition, the Harbour porpoise is covered by the Agreement on the Conservation of Small Cetaceans of the Baltic, North East Atlantic, Irish and North Seas (ASCOBANS), the Agreement on the Conservation of Cetaceans in the Black Sea, Mediterranean Sea and Contiguous Atlantic Area (ACCOBAMS) and the Memorandum of Understanding Concerning the Conservation of the Manatee and Small Cetaceans of Western Africa and Macaronesia. Their conservation statuses are either at least concern or data deficient.

As of 2014, only 505 Yangtze finless porpoises remained in the main section of the Yangtze, with an alarming population density in Ezhou and Zhenjiang. While many threatened species decline rate slows after their classification, population decline rates of the porpoise are actually accelerating. While population decline tracked from 1994 to 2008 has been pegged at a rate of 6.06% annually, from 2006 to 2012, the porpoise population decreased by more than half. Finless porpoise population decrease of 69.8% in just a 22-year span from 1976 to 2000. 5.3%. A majority of factors of this population decline are being driven by the massive growth in Chinese industry since 1990 which caused increased shipping and pollution and ultimately environmental degradation. Some of these can be seen in damming of the river as well as illegal fishing activity. To protect the species, China's Ministry of Agriculture classified the species as being National First Grade Key Protected Wild Animal, the strictest classification by law, meaning it is illegal to bring harm to a porpoise. Protective measures in the Tian-e-Zhou Oxbow Nature Reserve has increased its population of porpoises from five to forty in 25 years. The Chinese Academy of Sciences' Wuhan Institute of Hydrobiology has been working with the World Wildlife Fund to ensure the future for this subspecies, and have placed five porpoises in another well-protected area, the He-wang-miao oxbow. Five protected natural reserves have been established in areas of the highest population density and mortality rates with measures being taken to ban patrolling and harmful fishing gear in those areas. There have also been efforts to study porpoise biology to help specialize conservation through captivation breeding. The Baiji Dolphinarium, was established in 1992 at the Institute of Hydrobiology of the Chinese Academy of Sciences in Wuhan which allowing the study of behavioral and biological factors affecting the finless porpoise, specifically breeding biology like seasonal changes in reproductive hormones and breeding behavior.

Because vaquitas are indigenous to the Gulf of California, Mexico is leading conservation efforts with the creation of the International Committee for the Recovery of the Vaquita (CIRVA), which has tried to prevent the accidental deaths of vaquitas by outlawing the use of fishing nets within the vaquita's habitat. CIRVA has worked together with the CITES, the Endangered Species Act, and the Marine Mammal Protection Act (MMPA) to nurse the vaquita population back to a point at which they can sustain themselves. CIRVA concluded in 2000 that between 39 and 84 individuals are killed each year by such gillnets. To try to prevent extinction, the Mexican government has created a nature reserve covering the upper part of the Gulf of California and the Colorado River delta. They have also placed a temporary ban on fishing, with compensation to those affected, that may pose a threat to the vaquita.

== See also ==
- List of individual cetaceans
