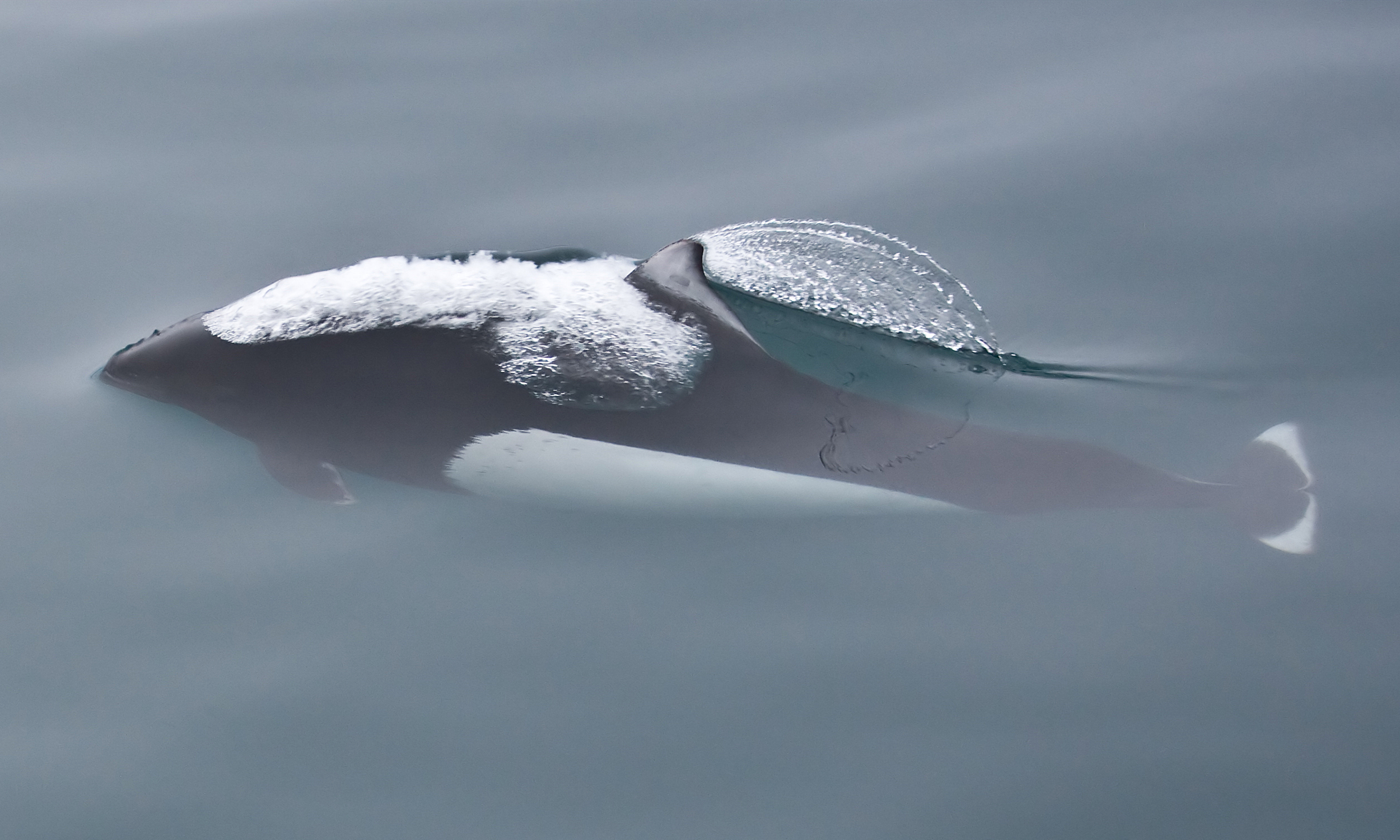
- P. d. dalli
- Size compared to an average human

Conservation status
- Least Concern (IUCN 3.1)
- CITES Appendix II

Scientific classification
- Kingdom: Animalia
- Phylum: Chordata
- Class: Mammalia
- Order: Artiodactyla
- Infraorder: Cetacea
- Family: Phocoenidae
- Genus: Phocoenoides (Andrews, 1911)
- Species: P. dalli

Binomial name
- Phocoenoides dalli (True, 1885)
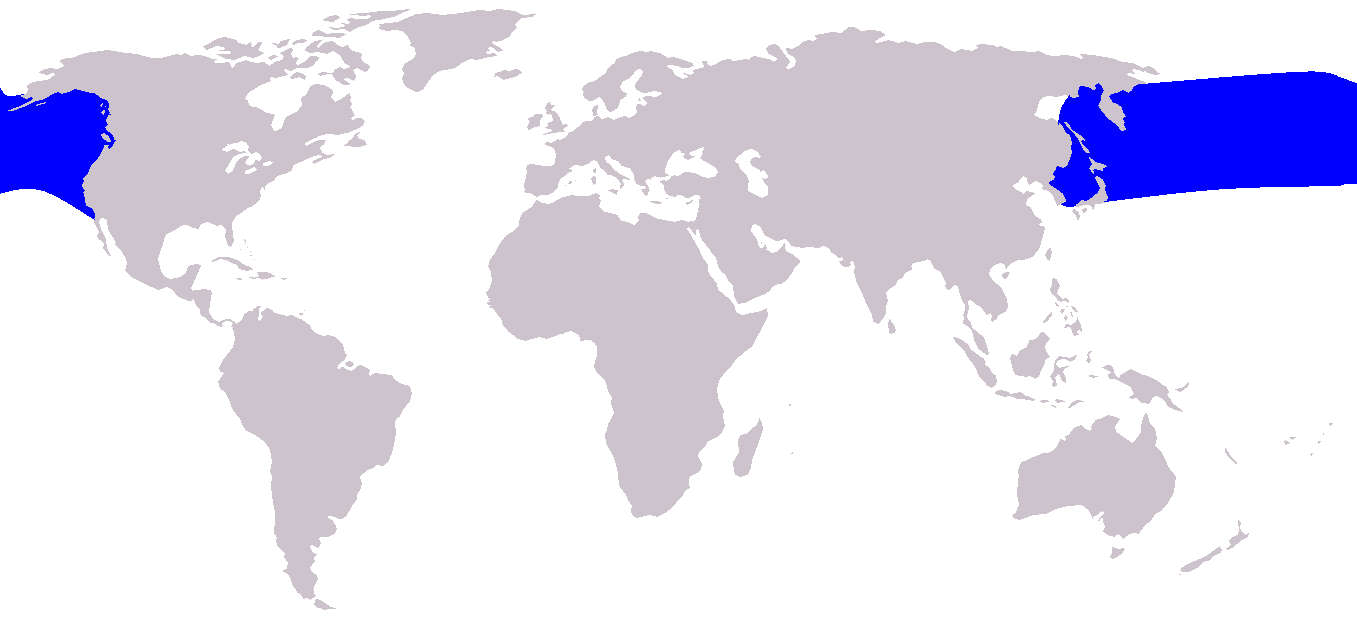
- Dall's porpoise range

= Dall's porpoise =

Species of porpoise endemic to the North Pacific

Dall's porpoise (Phocoenoides dalli) is a species of porpoise endemic to the North Pacific. It is the largest of porpoises and the only member of the genus Phocoenoides. The species is named after American naturalist W. H. Dall.

== Taxonomy ==
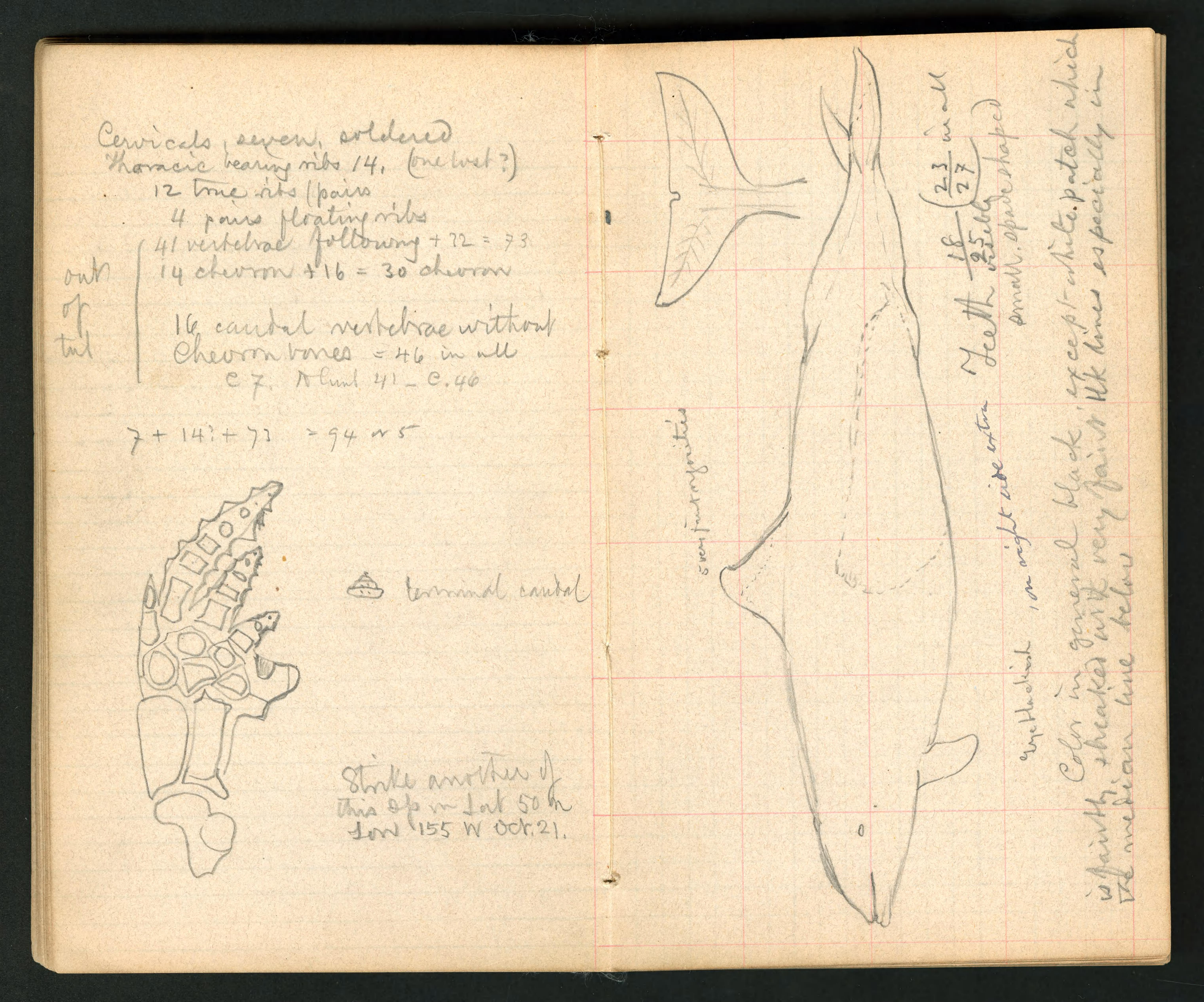
William H. Dall's 1873 field notes on Phocoenoides, from the Smithsonian's Field Books collection

Dall's porpoise is the only member of the genus Phocoenoides. The dalli and truei types were initially described as separate species in 1911, but later studies determined that the available evidence only supported the existence of one species.

=== Subspecies ===
Two colormorphs have been identified: the dalli type and truei type. The truei type, found only in the western Pacific, has a white belly patch that extends farther forward across the body than that of the dalli type.

Currently, these two color morphs are recognized as distinct subspecies, Dall's porpoise (Phocoenoides dalli dalli) and True's porpoise (Phocoenoides dalli truei).

== Distribution and habitat ==
Dall's porpoises are limited to the North Pacific: in the east from California to the Bering Sea and Okhotsk Sea, and in the west down to the Sea of Japan. They have been sighted as far south as Scammon's Lagoon in Baja California when water temperature was unseasonably cold.

Dall's porpoises generally prefer cold waters less than 18 °C (64 °F). Although mostly an offshore species, they do occur in deeper coastal waters, near submarine canyons or in fjords.

== Description ==
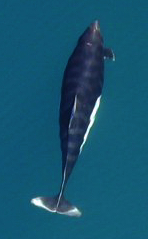
P. d. dalli dorsal view

Dall's porpoises can be easily distinguished from other porpoises and cetacean species within their range. They have a wide, robust body, a comparatively tiny head, and no distinguished beak. Their flippers are positioned at the front of the body and a triangular dorsal fin sits mid-body. Patterns of coloration are highly variable, but Dall's porpoises are mostly black, have white to grey patches on the flank and belly, and frosting on the dorsal fin and trailing edge of the fluke.

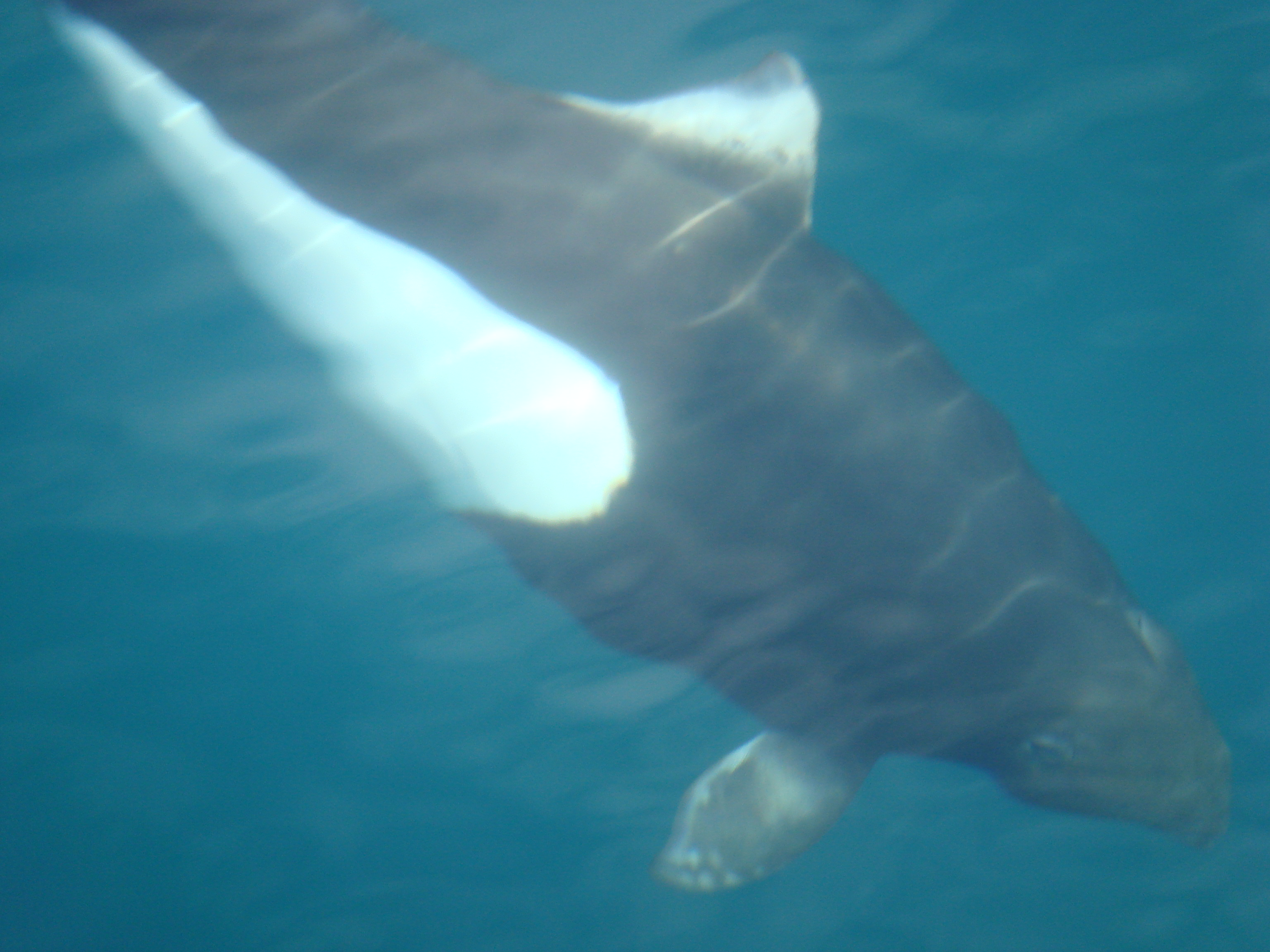
P. d. dalli in the Shelikof Strait, Alaska

They are the largest living porpoise species, growing up to 2.3 metres (7 ft 7 in) in length and weighing 130–220 kilograms (290–490 lb). Sexual dimorphism is apparent in body size and shape, with mature males being larger, developing a deeper caudal peduncle, and having a dorsal fin that is significantly angled forward in comparison to a female's. Dall's porpoise calves have a greyish coloration with no frosting on flippers and flukes. Calves measure about 100 cm at birth. Growth rates are similar at first, but at about two years old males begin to grow faster than females. Externally, maturity is measured by length which is usually attained at 3–5 years. Sizes vary between populations, but on average females reach a maximum size of 210 cm and males grow to about 220 cm, except in the southern Okhotsk Sea where males can grow as long as 239 cm.

== Behavior ==
=== Foraging ===
Dall's porpoises are opportunistic, hunting a variety of surface and mid-water species. Common prey are mesopelagic fish, such as myctophids, and gonatid squid. Stomach content analyses have also found cases of crustacean consumption, including krill and shrimp, but this is abnormal and likely not an important part of their diet. A previous study revealed that tagged Dall's porpoises spent most of their time within 10 m of the surface, but have been recorded diving to depths of up to 94 m.

=== Social ===
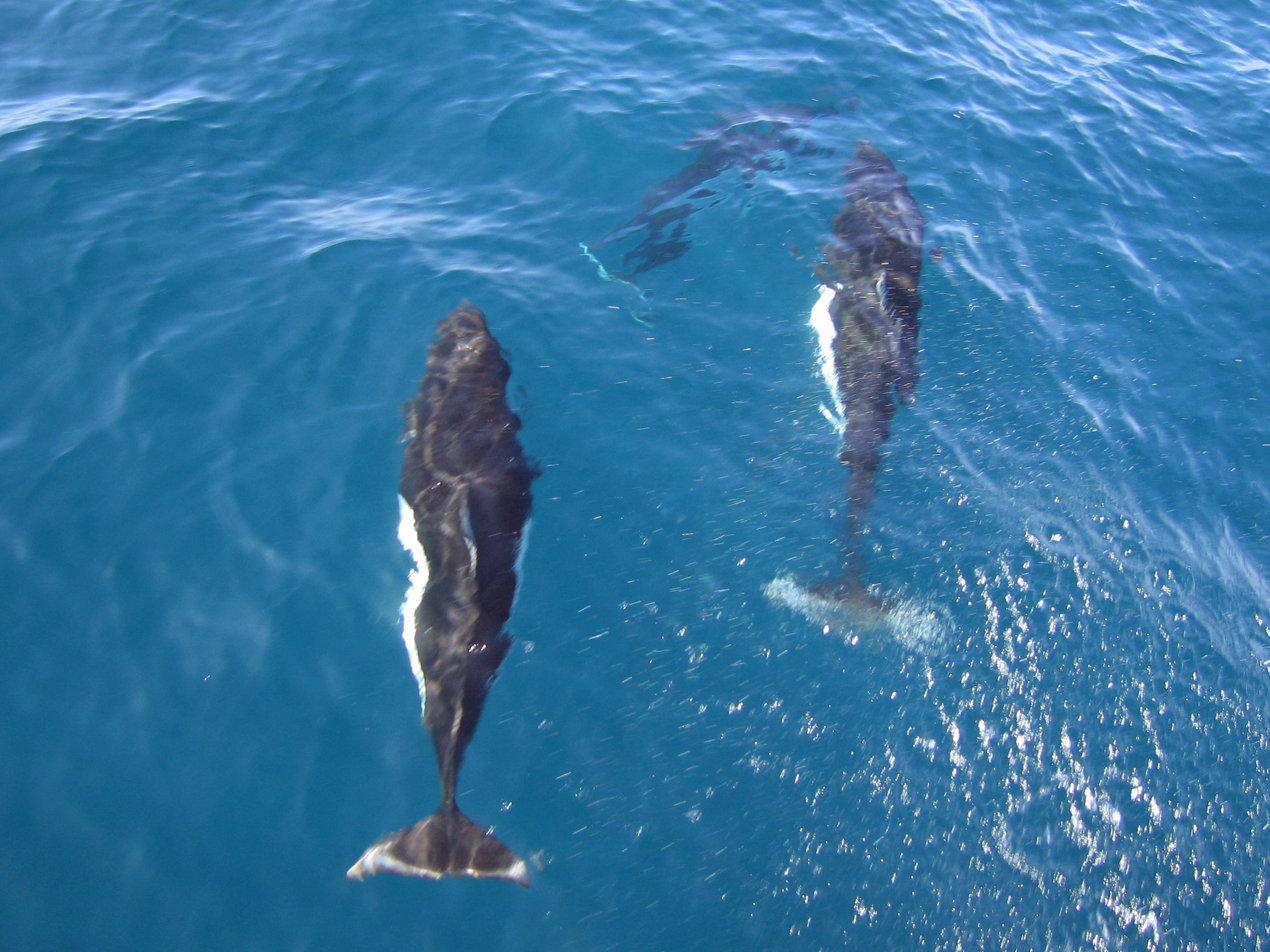
Group of P. d. dalli near Point Reyes, California

Dall's porpoises live in small, fluid groups of two to ten individuals, but aggregations of hundreds have been reported. They have a polygynous mating system in which males compete for females. During the mating season, a male will select a fertile female and guard her to ensure paternity. While guarding, males may sacrifice opportunities to forage on deep dives. Births usually take place in the summer after a gestation period of 11 to 12 months. Females generally give birth every 3 years, depending on their condition. Life expectancy is about 15 to 20 years, but a lot about their mortality is unknown.

Dall's porpoises are prey to transient killer whales. They have, however, been observed in association with resident killer whales, engaging in apparent play behaviors with their calves, and swimming with them. One recognizable Dall's porpoise was observed travelling with the AB pod of resident orca from May through October 1984. Great white sharks are also a known predator, with at least one documented case on the eastern North Pacific Ocean.

=== Movement ===
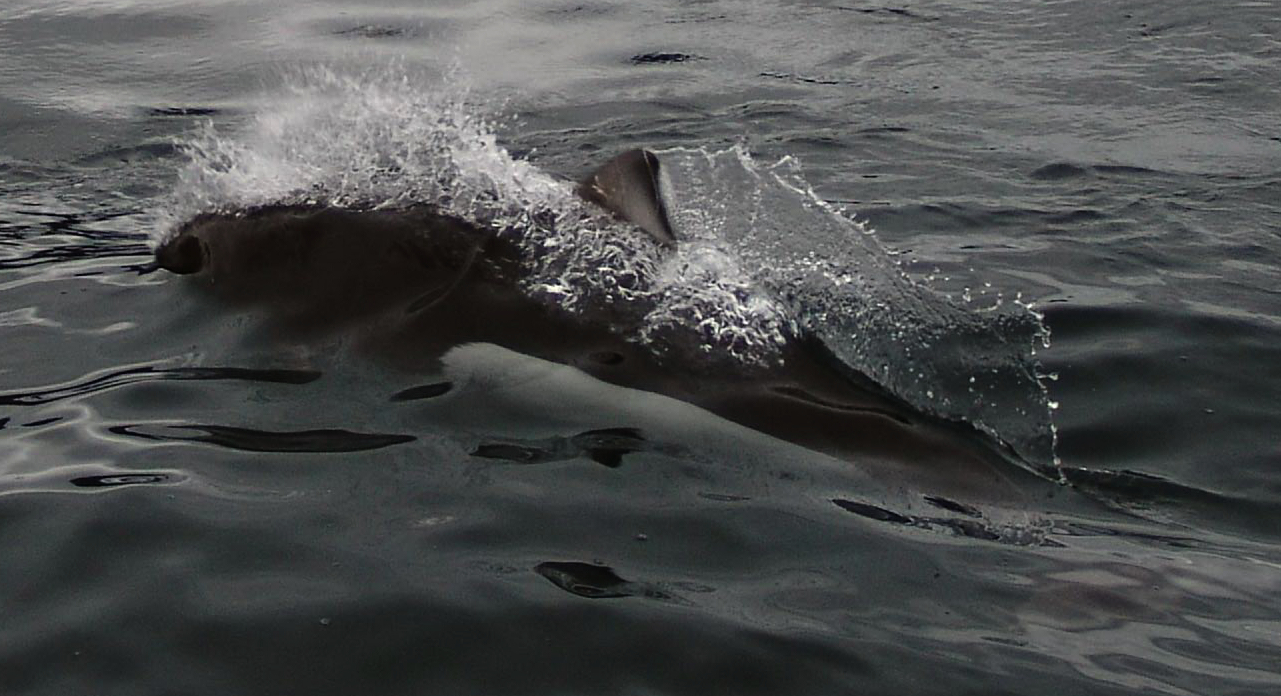
P. d. dalli in the Gulf of Alaska, causing a "rooster tail"

Dall's porpoises are highly active swimmers. Rapid swimming at the surface creates a characteristic spray called a "rooster tail". They are commonly seen approaching boats to bowride, and they will also ride on the waves formed at the heads of larger swimming whales.

== Population status ==
Abundance throughout their range and is estimated to be over one million, but current population trends are unknown.

Surveys along the coasts of California, Oregon, and Washington between 2008 and 2014 estimated a population abundance of 25,800. Alaska's population is estimated to be 83,400. Abundance in coastal British Columbia is nearly 5,000 individuals.

Populations in the western North Pacific are divided by both subspecies and migratory patterns. Abundance of the offshore dalli type is about 162,000. It is estimated that there are about 173,000 dalli type that travel between Japan and the southern Okhotsk Sea. The dalli type that migrates to the Okhotsk Sea in the summer is estimated at 111,000. The population of truei-type porpoises migrating between Japan and the central Okhotsk Sea number about 178,000.

== Threats ==
=== Fisheries bycatch ===
Dall's porpoises are vulnerable to fisheries bycatch. Thousands were killed in commercial driftnet fisheries until the United Nations issued a moratorium in the 1990s. Before the moratorium went into effect, 8,000 Dall's porpoises are estimated to have been bycaught in one year alone (1989–1990). Smaller numbers, from several hundred to a few thousand, are estimated to have been bycaught in Japanese salmon fisheries in US waters and in the Bering Sea from 1981 to 1987. Driftnet and trawl fisheries still operate in some areas throughout their range, with particularly high levels of bycatch in Russian waters.

=== Hunting ===
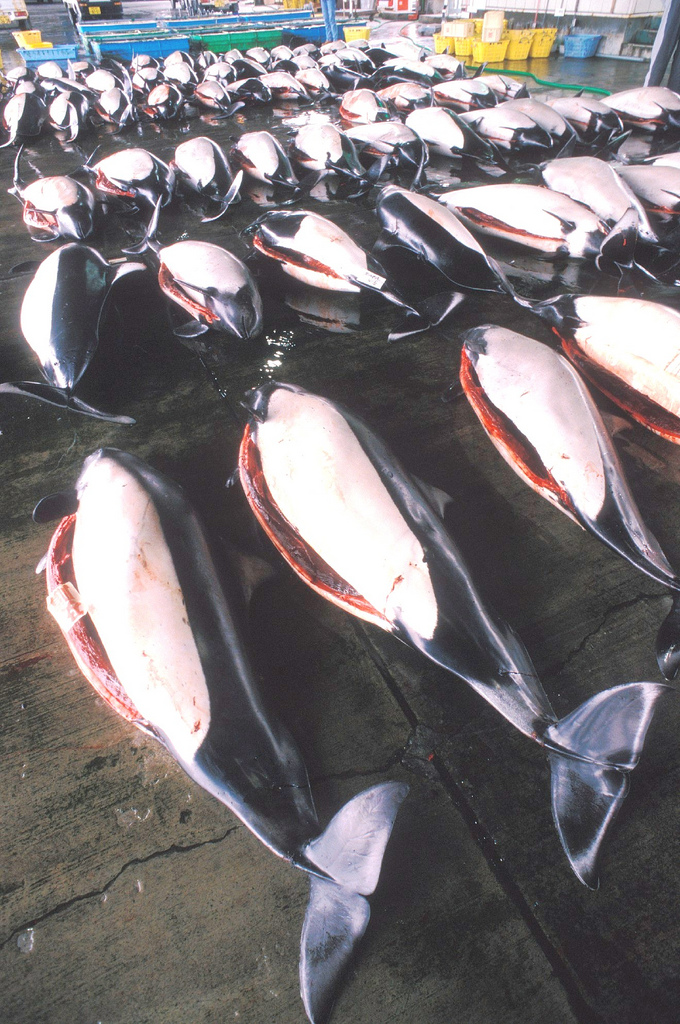
True's porpoises (P. d. truei) at market in Japan

The Dall's porpoise is still harvested for meat in Japan. The number of individuals taken each year increased following the 1980s moratorium on whaling of larger cetacean species. In 1988, more than 45,000 Dall's porpoises were harpooned. In 1990, after international attention was drawn to the issue, the Japanese government introduced a reduction on take. The hunt of Dall's porpoises has been criticized by scientific committees which question the sustainability of large quotas on regional populations. It has been suggested that the assessment of these target populations is outdated and that there may be a regional population decline given the reported annual catch. As of the FY 2023, the Japanese government had authorized the hunting of Dall's porpoise and True's porpoise only in Hokkaido, Iwate, and Miyagi prefectures, with a total quota of 8,535 animals, of which 109 were actually hunted.

=== Pollution ===
Environmental contaminants, including dichlorodiphenyldichloroethylene (DDE) and polychlorinated biphenyls (PCBs), are another threat to Dall's porpoises. Pollutants accumulate in the blubber layer, and in high concentrations can reduce hormone levels, affect the reproductive system, and result in calf death.

== Conservation status ==
Dall's porpoise is listed as Least Concern on the IUCN Red List. Levels of both bycatch and commercial hunting are likely underestimates because they account only for reported data; however, there is no evidence for a range-wide decline of the species.

The species is also listed on Appendix II of the Convention on the Conservation of Migratory Species of Wild Animals (CMS), and, like all other marine mammal species, is protected in the United States under the Marine Mammal Protection Act (MMPA).
