= Narrow-ridged finless porpoise =

Narrow-ridged finless porpoise may refer to one of two species in the genus Neophocaena:

- the East Asian finless porpoise (N. sunameri)
- the Yangtze finless porpoise (N. asiaeorientalis)
