= Charles Hoy =

Charles Hoy may refer to:

- Charles M. Hoy (1897–1923), American field naturalist
- Charles Sew Hoy (1836–1901), New Zealand merchant, Chinese leader and gold-dredger
