= Tian-e-Zhou Oxbow Nature Reserve =

Wetland nature reserve in Shishou, Hubei, China

The Tian-e-Zhou Oxbow Nature Reserve is an area of wetland in the Yangtze basin near Shishou, Hubei province, People's Republic of China. Inside the reserve is the Tian'e-Zhou lake which was an intended sanctuary for the baiji (Yangtze river dolphin) and is currently holding 28 finless porpoises.

== The reserve ==
In 1988, the River Dolphin Research group in Wuhan proposed the idea of placing the rapidly declining baiji in the Tian'e-Zhou oxbow lake. The reserve was intended to hold any captured baiji, since it had a healthy fish population and could sustain over 50 baiji if breeding was successful. The oxbow was connected to the Yangtze during the summer when the water level was high, so nets were installed to ensure the baiji would not escape. Five finless porpoises were first introduced in 1990 to see if it was a suitable habitat. Further relocation attempts took place. However, some porpoises died and others escaped the reserve during floods. In 1995, an adult female baiji was caught and immediately transported to the oxbow. After a few days she was seen swimming and feeding. After the 1996 flood she was found dead, entangled in the nets preventing her from leaving the reserve. Scientists studying her stomach contents show that there was little food inside, likely as a result of competition with more aggressive porpoises. She was the last baiji to live in the Tian'e-Zhou reserve.

== See also ==
- Baiji
- Yangtze Freshwater Dolphin Expedition 2006
