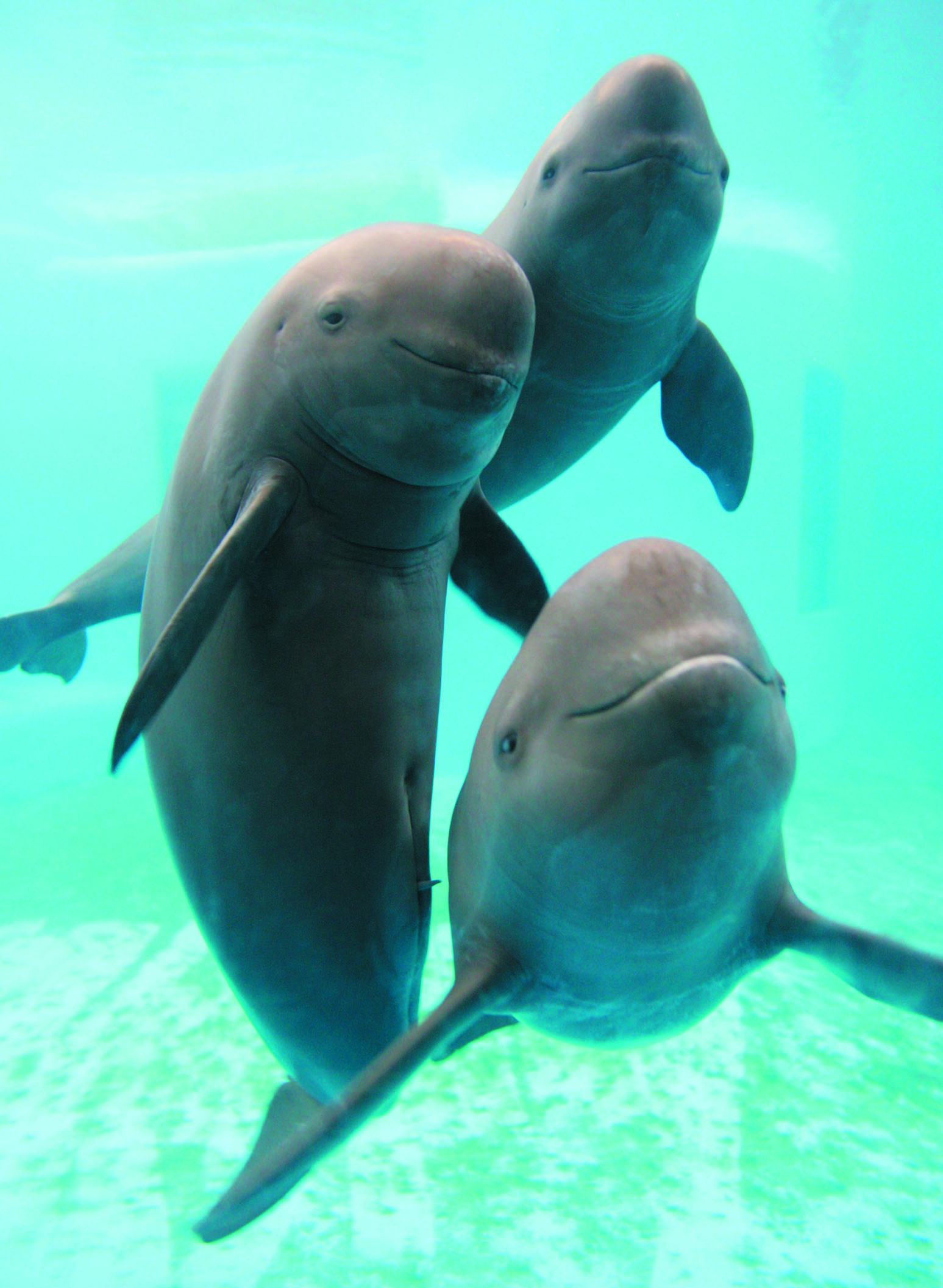
- At the Chinese Academy of Sciences

Conservation status
- Critically Endangered (IUCN 3.1)
- CITES Appendix I

Scientific classification
- Kingdom: Animalia
- Phylum: Chordata
- Class: Mammalia
- Order: Artiodactyla
- Infraorder: Cetacea
- Family: Phocoenidae
- Genus: Neophocaena
- Species: N. asiaeorientalis

Binomial name
- Neophocaena asiaeorientalis (Pilleri & Gihr, 1972)
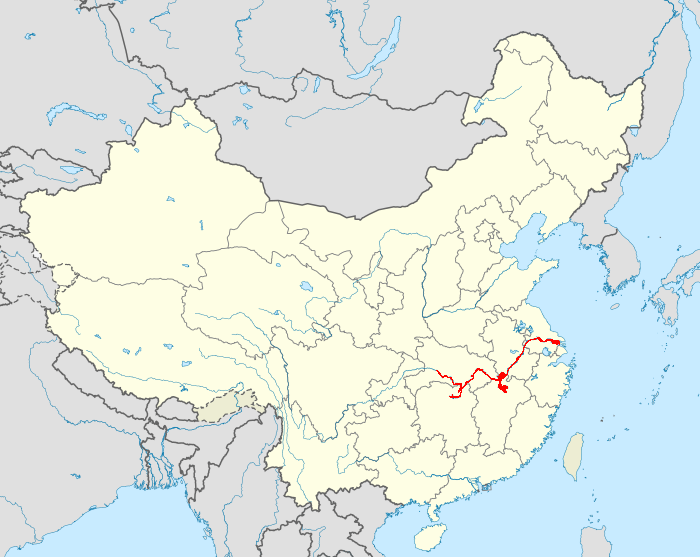
- Yangtze finless porpoise distribution

= Yangtze finless porpoise =

Species of porpoise endemic to China

The Yangtze finless porpoise (Neophocaena asiaeorientalis) is a species of toothed whale in the family Phocoenidae, the porpoise family. It is endemic to the Yangtze River in China, making it the country's only known freshwater cetacean following the possible extinction of the baiji (Lipotes vexillifer), a freshwater dolphin also native to the Yangtze. The Yangtze finless porpoise is considered critically endangered and it is estimated that only about 1,426 remain as of 2026. This small toothed whale faces many of the same threats as the baiji: high human activity on the Yangtze, such as illegal fishing, pollution, boat traffic, and dam construction. Due to the rapidly declining population of the species, the Chinese government and conservation charities are working to help save it from extinction. According to a 2026 report by China’s Ministry of Agriculture and Rural Affairs, the population of Yangtze finless porpoises has increased by 177 since 2022, thanks to a 10-year fishing ban for the Yangtze River implemented in 2021.

== Taxonomy ==
The Yangtze finless porpoise is considered a freshwater cetacean (whales, dolphins, and porpoises that live in a variety of aquatic habitats). The finless porpoise originally inhabited salt water niches along the coast of the Indo-Pacific Ocean. However, a population dispersed into the fresh water environment of the Yangtze River. Recent studies have found that the East Asian finless porpoise (N. sunameri) and the Yangtze finless porpoise (N. asiaeorientalis) have had separate reproduction and gene flow for thousands of years. The East Asian finless porpoise and the Yangtze finless porpoise were formerly considered one species going by the scientific name of N. phocaenoides, but genetic studies support the Yangtze finless porpoise being a distinct species, or at least an incipient one, due to the lack of gene flow.

== Names ==
In Mandarin Chinese, it is known as jiangtun (Chinese: 江豚, p jiāngtún, lit. "river piglet")

== Description ==
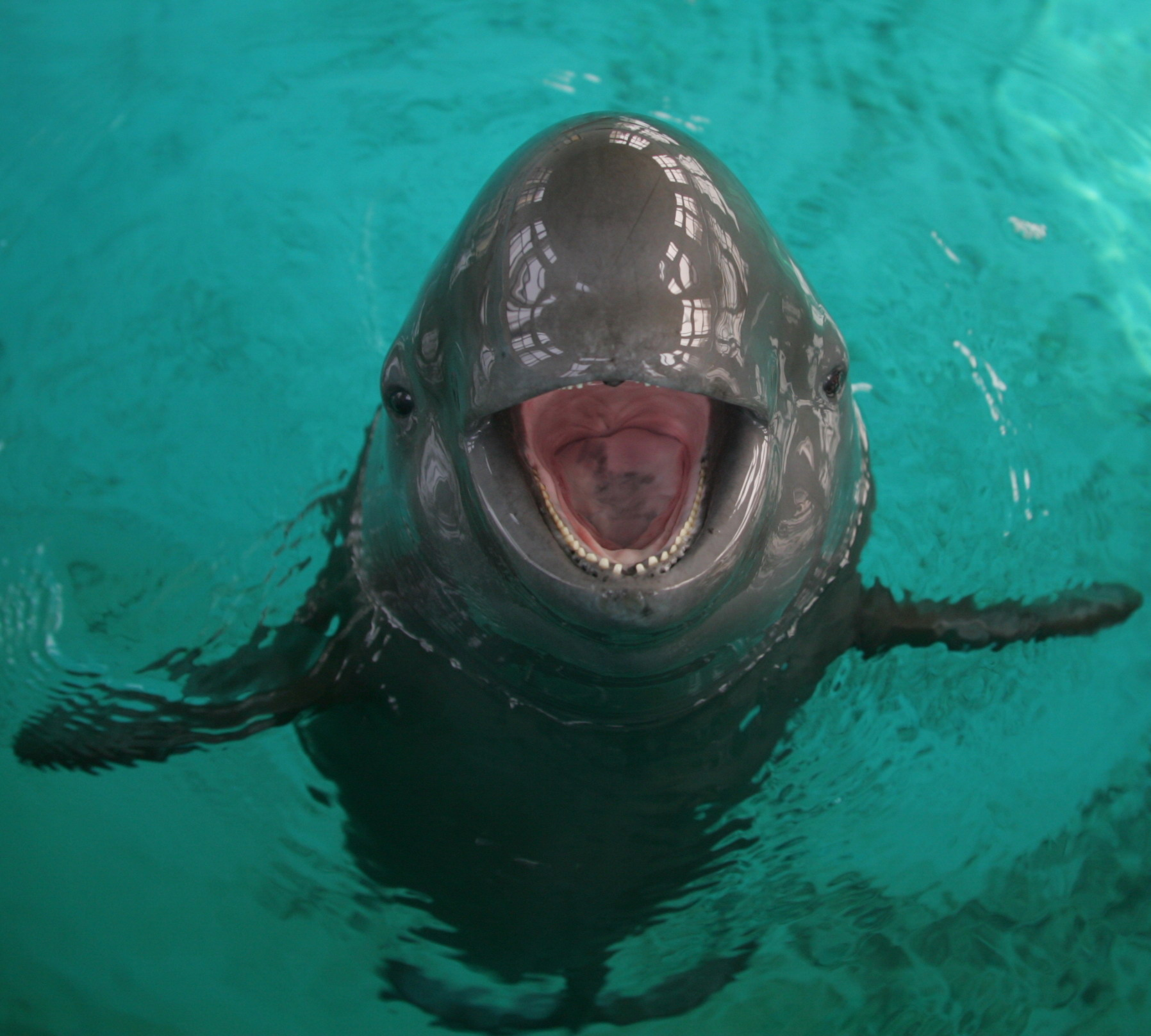
At the Institute of Hydrobiology in Wuhan, China

A finless porpoise can grow up to 2.27–2.29 m (7 ft 5 1/2 in – 7 ft 6 in) in length and weigh up to 71.8–123 kg (158 1/4–271 1/4 lb), however, most are smaller than this. The average adult is usually 1.5–1.8 m (5–6 ft) in length and weighs around 45 kg (100 lb). Adult females tend to be smaller than adult males. Flippers are curved with pointed ends and are relative large, about 20% of their total body length. The finless porpoise tends to be stocky in the middle body and slimmer towards the tail. In general they are more slender in shape than most other Phocoenidae. These cetaceans also have unique foreheads, with a very steep forehead and no beak. In addition, they have an unfused neck vertebra that allows free head movement. They have 15–22 pairs of teeth on the upper and lower jaw. Body color and dorsal ridge sizes vary depending on the geographical location of the finless porpoise.

=== Dorsal ridge ===
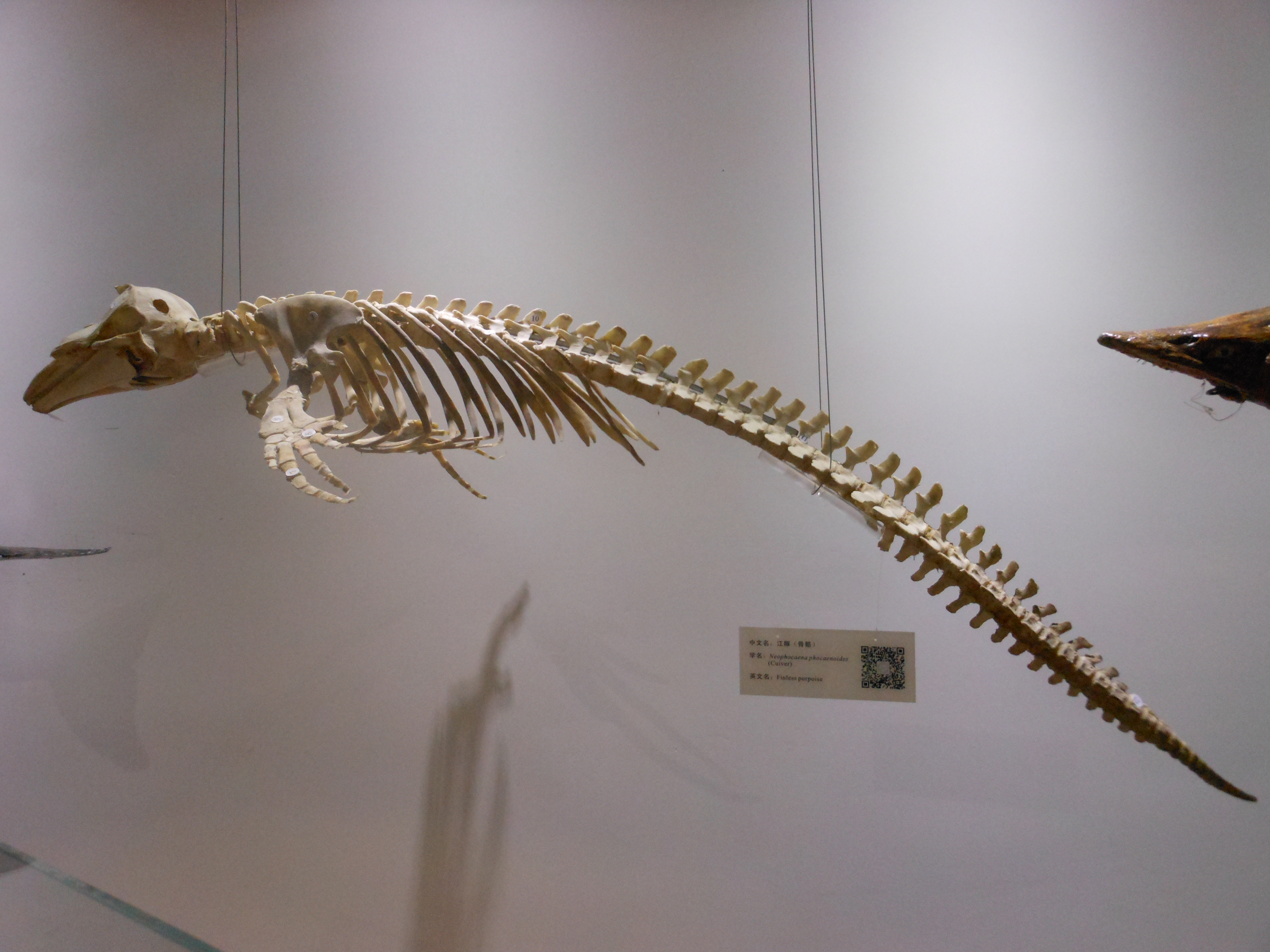
Skeleton

As denoted by the name, these finless porpoises have flat backs and are completely finless. Instead of a dorsal fin, these porpoises have a dorsal ridge or "groove" that is covered in varying rows of tubercles. These tubercles are round in shape and raised. Recent studies have found that tubercles do have biological and mechanical functions that benefit the porpoise; for example, the tubercles are a sensory organ and can also help with movement through the water. The amount of rows of tubercles and dorsal ridge sizes vary depending on the species and location of the porpoise. The East Asian finless porpoise and the Yangtze finless porpoise usually have a higher and narrower ridge with only 1 - 10 rows of tubercles, whereas the Indo-Pacific finless porpoise (Neophocaena phocaenoides) tends to have a lower and wider ridge with 10–25 rows of tubercles. The dorsal ridge can be as wide as 12 cm (4.7 in) or only 0.2 cm (.08 in).

=== Body color ===
Body color also varies depending on habitat location and age. Newborn Yangtze finless porpoises and East Asian finless porpoises tend to be a dark gray or black color that lightens within a few months to a lighter gray. However, the Indo-Pacific species has a reverse trend, in which newborns are light in color and get darker with age. After death Yangtze finless porpoises usually become black in color. It is also very common for there to be lighter patches of color around the mouth and genitals; however this coloration is more noticeable at a young age.

== Habitat ==
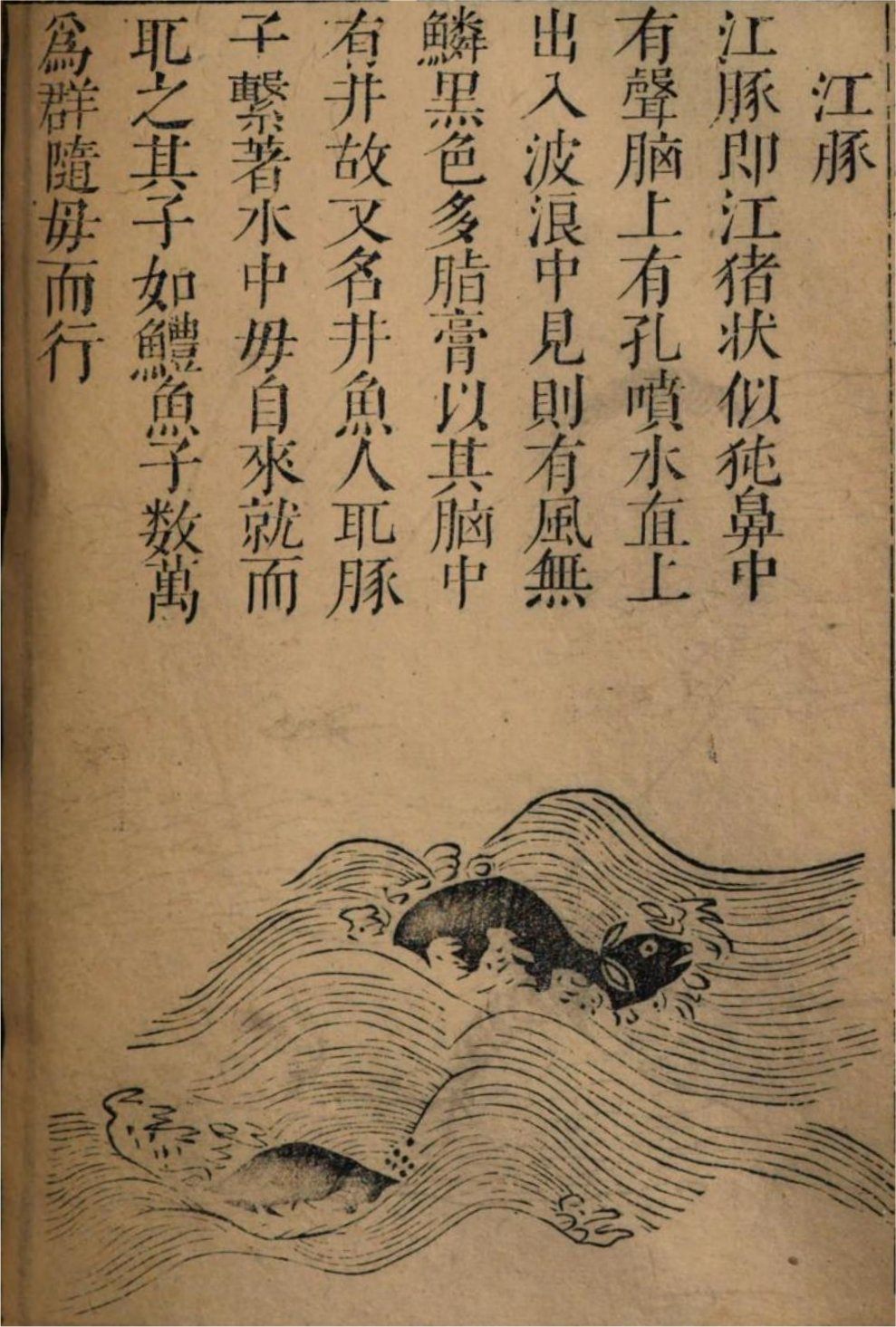
Depiction of a Yangtze finless porpoise (jiangtun) in the Sancai Tuhui encyclopedia. Ming dynasty, 1609

The Yangtze finless porpoise is found in the main body of the Yangtze River and in connecting lakes. They are exclusive to fresh water, making them different from other finless porpoises. They tend to be found in shallow bay areas, swamps, and estuaries year round as they are not a migratory species. However, distribution changes do occur seasonally. In the winter the highest distribution was found in the middle and lower regions of the Yangtze River. Their preferred climate is tropical or warm temperatures.

== Diet ==
The diet of the Yangtze finless porpoise may vary according to the season and the dominant prey of the season. This variation in their diet suggest that the Yangtze finless porpoise may be opportunistic feeders. Among the fishes in their diet, the most common are Coilia brachygnathus, Pseudobrama simoni, Pelteobagrus nitidus, and Hemiculter bleekeri.

== Behavior ==
The Yangtze finless porpoise tends to be shy; it does not come to the surface of the water often when there is human activity nearby. They are usually most active when eating and usually spend most of their time near river banks or at the merging of two waterways. Yangtze finless porpoises travel in small groups of about three to six; however groups of 20 have been reported. A radio-tracking study confirmed that the average diving behavior consisted of one long dive followed by two shorter dives. These longer dives were more common during the day time. In the Yangtze River, finless porpoises are known to leap from the water and perform "tail stands". At night the finless porpoises tended to go into sleep cycles and be less active. Another unique behavior reported, but that is not heavily confirmed, is that mothers have been seen carrying calves on their backs. An additional uncommon aspect of the finless porpoise is their method of communication. Rather than communicating through whistles, as most dolphin species do, these porpoises use echolocation and ultrasonic pulses.

== Status ==
After the functional extinction of the Yangtze river dolphin and the rapid decreasing of population, the Chinese government has given this species the utmost conservation status of National First Grade Key Protected Wild Animal to ensure its survival. However, the population decrease is accelerating due to lack of food, pollution, and ship movement, and the species has a high chance (86.06%) of becoming extinct within the next 100 years. Another reason that they have been dropping in numbers is because of underwater noise pollution. If spectra levels in the water surpass the underwater acoustic thresholds for the porpoise, their chance of survival is greatly threatened. Global conservation agencies and charities, such as the World Wildlife Fund and IUCN, have been collaborating with the Chinese government to ensure the survival of the species.

=== Threats ===
==== Fishing ====
Bycatch by unwary fishermen may be a factor for the ongoing decline of the Yangtze finless porpoise. Illegal fishing and hazardous gear, like gillnets, is widely used in the Yangtze River. The preferred habitat of the Yangtze Finless Porpoise overlaps extensively with the usage of gillnets, which makes the species particularly vulnerable to entanglement and subsequent drowning. However, a recent large-scale interview survey conducted in fishing communities along the banks of the Yangtze, by the IUCN, suggests that mortality due to bycatch may have decreased over the past two decades as the porpoise population has declined, and have concluded that gillnetting is unlikely to be the primary cause of their decline.

==== Development ====
Increased traffic, pollution, and habitat degradation of the river have contributed to population declines. The increased vessel traffic may cause death from propeller strikes, and the boat noise may mask the porpoise's ability to communicate with other porpoises, as well as hindering their biosonar which compromises foraging and locomotion. Porpoise mortality associated with vessel collisions has increased substantially in recent years, in contrast to mortality from by-catch.

Widespread sand mining of the river and lake beds and banks has destroyed important habitats for porpoises and food items, as well as other environmental issues. This problem is especially serious in the Dongting and Poyang Lakes. There are currently 400 million people living along the river basin as well as thousands of factories, which together discharge tremendous quantities of domestic sewage and agricultural and industrial waste. It has not been proven that this impacts the Yangtze finless porpoise's health, fertility, or population. In April 2004, five porpoises died in Dongting Lake within a single week due to short-term exposure to pesticides, possibly in combination with long-term exposure to mercury and chromium.

Dams have major effects on river and lake ecology, and inhibit access between the river and adjoining lakes or tributaries in the Yangtze, as well as affecting migrating prey items. The Three Gorges Dam in particular has altered and will continue to alter, downstream conditions in the Yangtze River and its connected/adjoining lakes. Construction of the Poyang Lake Dam is likely to damage the remaining population severely.

=== Conservation ===
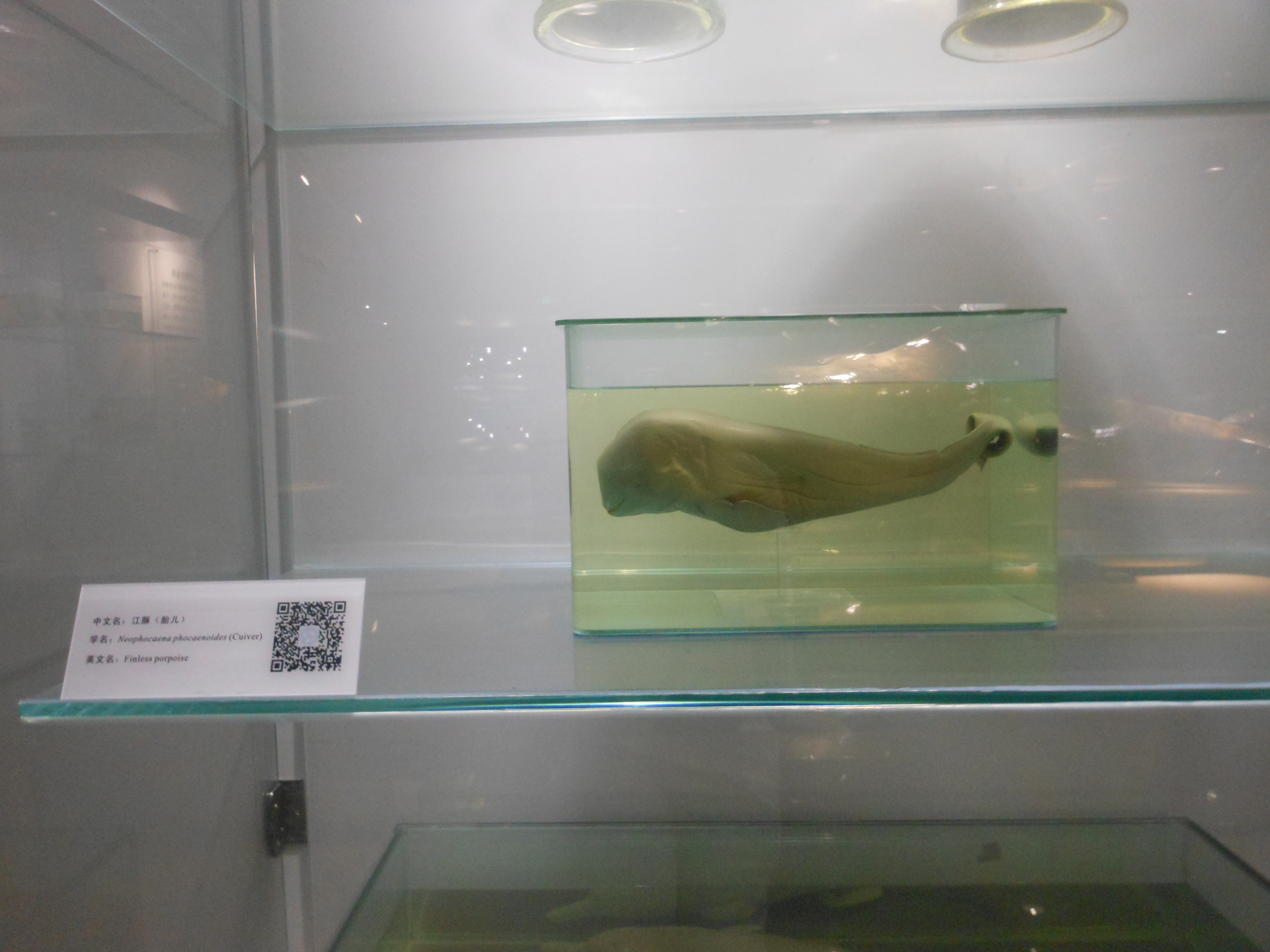
Preserved fetus of a Yangtze finless porpoise

As of 2014, 505 porpoises remain in the main section of the Yangtze, with an alarming population density in Ezhou and Zhenjiang. While many threatened species decline rate slows after their classification, population decline rates of the porpoise are actually accelerating. While population decline tracked from 1994 to 2008 has been pegged at a rate of 6.06% annually, from 2006 to 2012, the porpoise population decreased by more than half. Finless porpoise population decrease of 69.8% in just a 22-year span from 1976 to 2000. 5.3%. A 2012 survey by the World Wildlife Fund indicated the rate of decline had accelerated to 13.7% per year. By 2017, the number in the Yangtze had increased to 1,012. Due to ongoing protection efforts, the porpoises have reappeared in places like Nantong, where sightings had been rare in recent years.

A majority of factors of this population decline are being driven by the massive growth in Chinese industry since 1990 which caused increased shipping and pollution and ultimately environmental degradation. Some of these can be seen in damming of the river as well as illegal fishing activity. To protect the species, China's Ministry of Agriculture classified the species as being National First Grade Key Protected Wild Animal, the strictest classification by law, meaning it is illegal to bring harm to a porpoise.

The Tian-e-Zhou Oxbow Nature Reserve has worked for years to protect the porpoises. The reserve, which is sponsored by the Chinese government, World Wildlife Fund, the Coca-Cola Company, and others, increased its porpoise population from five to forty in twenty-five years. By 2017, there were 80 individuals, nearing the total capacity of 100. The Chinese Academy of Sciences' Wuhan Institute of Hydrobiology has been working with the World Wildlife Fund to ensure the future for this subspecies, and have placed five porpoises in another well-protected area, the He-wang-miao oxbow.

Five protected natural reserves have been established in areas of the highest population density and mortality rates with measures being taken to ban patrolling and harmful fishing gear in those areas. There have also been efforts to study porpoise biology to help specialize conservation through captive breeding. The Baiji Dolphinarium, was established in 1992 at the Institute of Hydrobiology of the Chinese Academy of Sciences in Wuhan which allows the study of behavioral and biological factors affecting the finless porpoise, specifically breeding biology like seasonal changes in reproductive hormones and breeding behavior.

The first Yangtze finless porpoise was born in captivity on July 5, 2005, in Baji Dolphinarium in Wuhan. A 2.48 Gb completely gap-free genome assembly of the Yangtze finless porpoise was sequenced to study the genetic health and assist in population management. This work demonstrating increased threats to genetic damage and genome stability in the species.
