= Tianzhou =

Tianzhou or Tian Zhou may refer to:

- Tianzhou (spacecraft), automated cargo vessel derivative of Tiangong-1
  - Tianzhou 1, 2017 mission of the Tianzhou spacecraft
- Tianzhou language
- Tianzhou (田州镇 tián-zhōu-zhèn), a town in Tianyang County, Baise, Guangxi, China

== See also ==
- Tian-e-Zhou Oxbow Nature Reserve
- Zhoutian (disambiguation)
