= Dongsheng, Hubei =

Dongsheng 东升镇
- Town
- Location in Hubei
- Coordinates: 29°42′50″N 112°31′48″E
- Country: People's Republic of China
- Province: Hubei
- Prefecture-level city: Jingzhou
- County-level city: Shishou

Area
  - Total: 173.1 km^{2} (66.8 sq mi)
- Elevation: 33 m (108 ft)

Population (2010)
  - Total: 53,184
  - Density: 307.2/km^{2} (795.8/sq mi)
- Time zone: UTC+8 (China Standard)
- Area code: 0716

Dongsheng (simplified Chinese: 东升; traditional Chinese: 東升; pinyin: Dōngshēng; lit. 'east ascends') is a town in southern Hubei province, China, about 7 kilometres (4.3 mi) south of the Yangtze River, 10 km (6.2 mi) east of Shishou, which administers it, and 10 km (6.2 mi) north of the border with Hunan. As of 2011, it has 3 residential communities (社区) and 33 villages under its administration.

== Administrative divisions ==
Three communities:

- Huajiadang (滑家垱社区), Ping'an (平安社区), Jiaoshanhe (焦山河社区)

Thirty-three villages:

- Tunzishan (屯子山村), Tongzigang (童子岗村), Fengshan (凤山村), Tuchengyuan (土城垸村), Sanjiayuan (三家垸村), Zhuangjiapu (庄家铺村), Chenjiapu (陈家铺村), Changdisi (长堤寺村), Bijiatang (毕家塘村), Zinandi (梓楠堤村), Xindikou (新堤口村), Wanghai (王海村), Huayuhu (花鱼湖村), Lianghu (两湖村), Huangjiatan (黄家潭村), Yazihu (鸭子湖村), Nanhetou (南河头村), Yuelianghu (月亮湖村), Machuan (马船村), Xianzhongmiao (显忠庙村), Dayangshu (大杨树村), Zoumaling (走马岭村), Guanluqi (关路圻村), Xiemamiao (歇马庙村), Bajiaoling (八角岭村), Jiangjiachong (蒋家冲村), Dongjialou (董家剅村), Yanglin (杨林村), Dongsheng (东升村), Sanheyuan (三合垸村), Yujiapeng (余家棚村), Xingangkou (新港口村), Yayanqiao (鸭堰桥村)

Four other areas:

- Yazihu (鸭子湖渔场), State-run Farm (国营种畜场), Shangjinhu (上津湖渔场), Yanzhi (胭脂湖渔场)

== See also ==
- List of township-level divisions of Hubei
