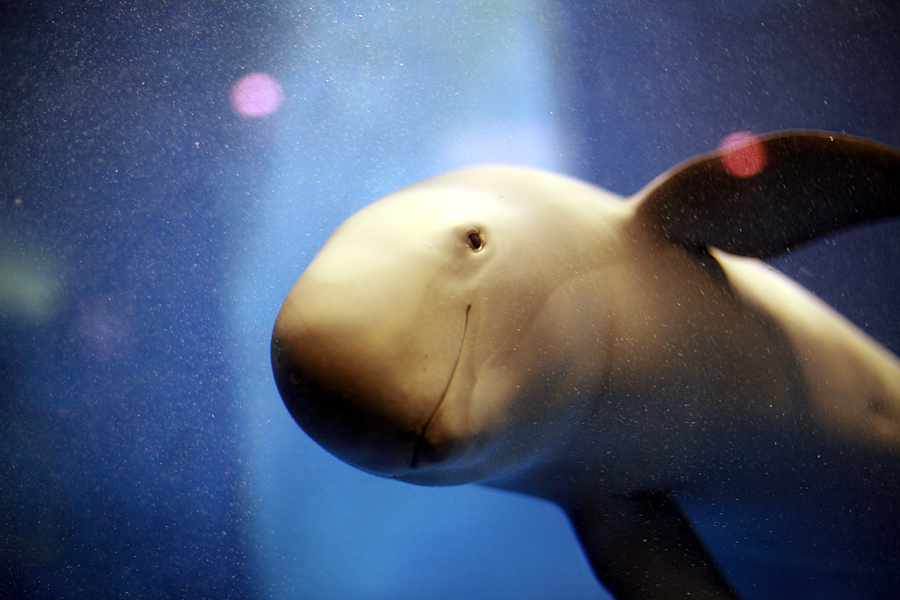
- At Miyajima Public Aquarium

Conservation status
- Endangered (IUCN 3.1)

Scientific classification
- Kingdom: Animalia
- Phylum: Chordata
- Class: Mammalia
- Infraclass: Placentalia
- Order: Artiodactyla
- Infraorder: Cetacea
- Family: Phocoenidae
- Genus: Neophocaena
- Species: N. sunameri

Binomial name
- Neophocaena sunameri Pilleri & Gihr, 1975

= East Asian finless porpoise =

Species of porpoise

The East Asian finless porpoise (Neophocaena sunameri) is a species of porpoise native to the East China Sea, Yellow Sea, and the seas around Japan. The Yangtze finless porpoise (N. asiaeorientalis) was formerly considered a subspecies but is now thought to be a distinct species.

== Name ==
The Korean communities of the porpoise are sometimes known as sanggwaengi (Korean: 상괭이) and the Japanese communities, particularly the subspecies N. p. sunameri, as sunameri (Japanese: 砂滑)(Japanese: スナメリ).

== Distribution ==
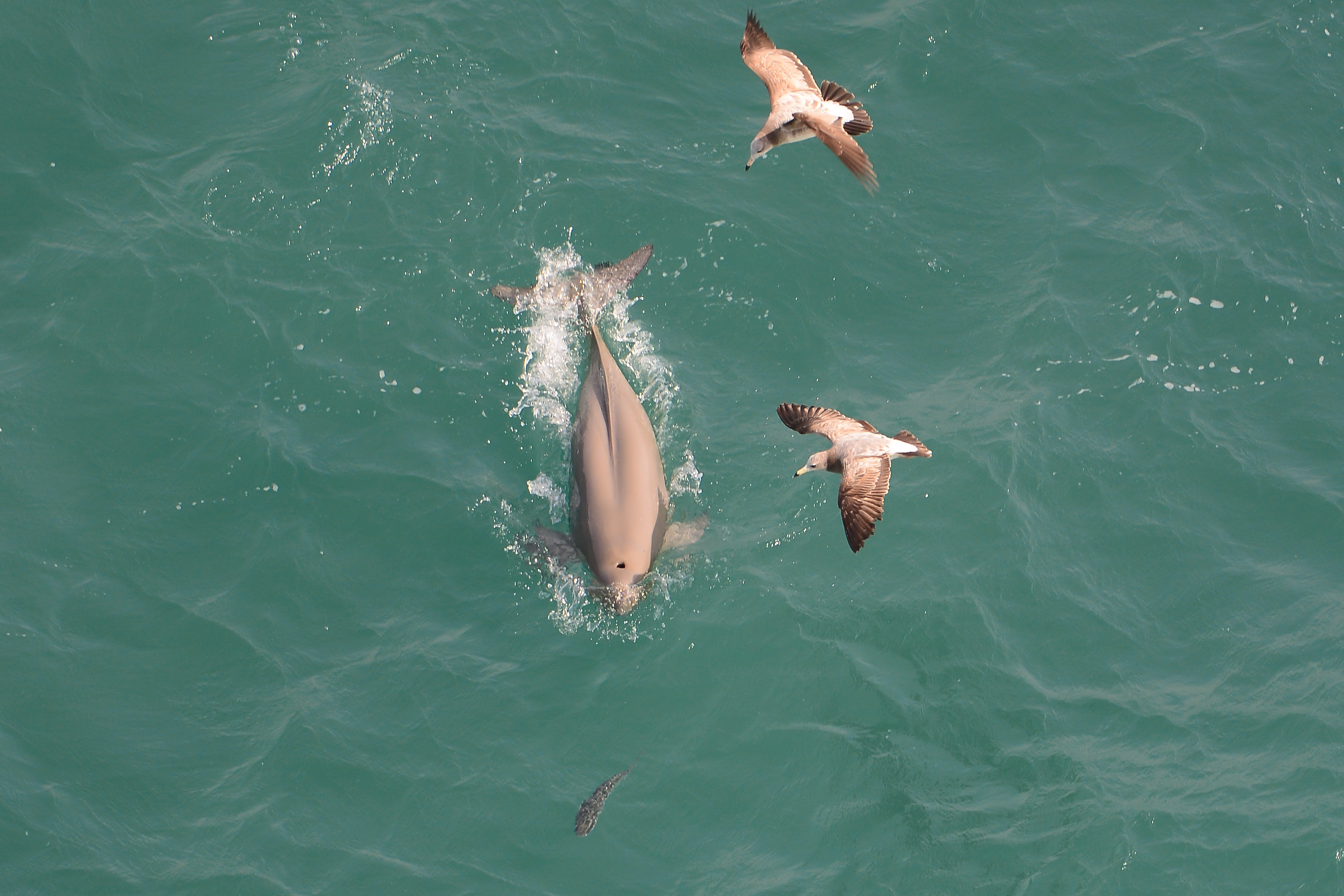
In the Namhae

The species inhabits the coastal areas off mainland China (e.g., Chongming Island) south to the Penghu Islands. The Matsu Islands are thought to be their northern limit, and the local population in this area is physically smaller than the Indo-Pacific finless porpoise. These two species overlap in the Matsu region. The population in coastal waters around Japan is geographically isolated by the deep waters between Japan and continental Asia. Vagrant animals can reach the Ryukyu Islands.

== Habitat ==
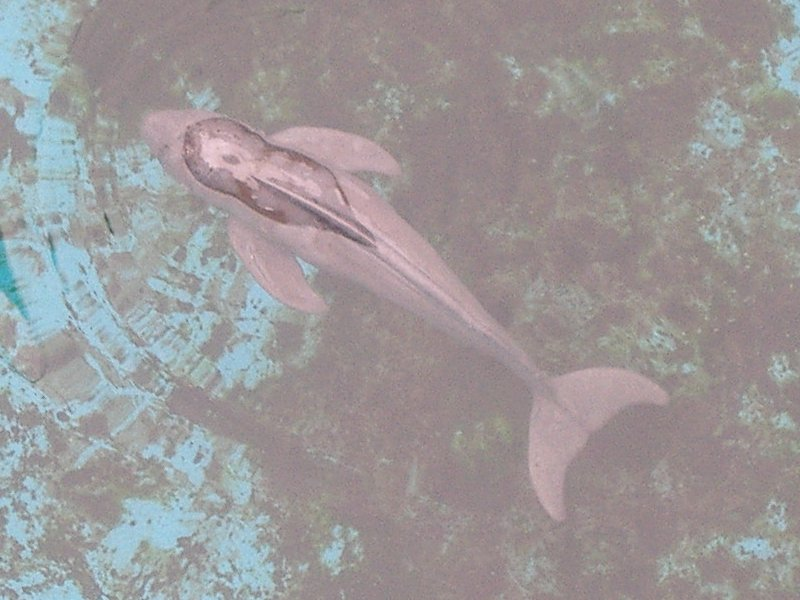
A young porpoise in Tokyo Bay

Throughout their range, the porpoises stay in shallow waters, up to 50 m (160 ft) deep, close to the shore, in waters with soft or sandy seabed, or in estuaries and mangrove swamps. In exceptional cases, they have been encountered as far as 135 km (84 mi) off-shore in the East China and Yellow Seas, albeit still in shallow water.

== Description ==
Finless porpoises can grow to as much as 2.27 m (7 ft 5 in) in length, and can weigh up to 72 kg (159 lb), although most are smaller. Adults grow more than 1.55 m (5 ft) in length and up to 30–45 kg (65–100 lb) in weight. The flippers are moderately large, reaching up to 20% of the total body length. Adults are typically a uniform, light grey color, although some may have lighter patches of skin around the mouth, or darker patches in front of the flippers. Newborn calves of the central and eastern subspecies are mostly black with grey around the dorsal ridge area, becoming fully grey after four to six months. However, newborn calves of the western subspecies are a light creamy grey and become darker as they age.

=== Anatomy ===
The anatomy of finless porpoises has been relatively well studied, compared with that of some other cetacean species. The tubercles along the dorsal ridge are known to contain numerous nerve endings that have a sensory function. The auditory system also appears well-developed, with numerous nerve fibers specialized for rapid communication between the ears and the brain. Sight is relatively poor, however, due to the overall cloudiness of the Yangtze River; they have a reduced lens and a limited number of fibers in the optic nerve and to the muscles moving the eyes compared to the Indo-Pacific finless porpoise. It is speculated that their vision is somewhat better than that of the Yangtze river dolphin.

The skeleton is light, accounting for only 5% of the total weight of the animal. There are between 58 and 65 vertebrae, about half of them in the tail, and with the first three cervical vertebrae fused into a single structure. This reduces flexibility of the neck while increasing stability in the water. There are ten to fourteen pairs of ribs in the chest, and an additional set of vestigial ribs has sometimes been reported in the neck, in association with the seventh cervical vertebra. There are 44 sets of spinal nerves. Like all porpoises, they have spade-shaped teeth well suited for catching small fish and shrimp. Their skeletal design allows them to leap from the water and perform "tail stands".

The nasal passage contains nine or ten air sacs, which are capable of sealing off all air within the passage. Behind these are an additional set of vomeronasal sacs. The trachea, however, is short, with only four cartilaginous rings. The stomach has three chambers, with no caecum, and no distinct difference between the small and large intestines.

Sexual maturity is thought to occur at around six years, with only one calf born at a time. The gestation period is approximately one year long and lactation lasts for over six months.

== Behavior ==
In Chinese coastal waters, finless porpoises are generally found in groups of three to six, although aggregations of up to about 50 have been reported. In Japanese waters, groups appear to be smaller, with pairs being typical, and even rare aggregations being no larger than 13 individuals.

== Diet ==
The species consumes fish, shrimp and squid in the Yellow Sea/Bohai area.

== Conservation ==
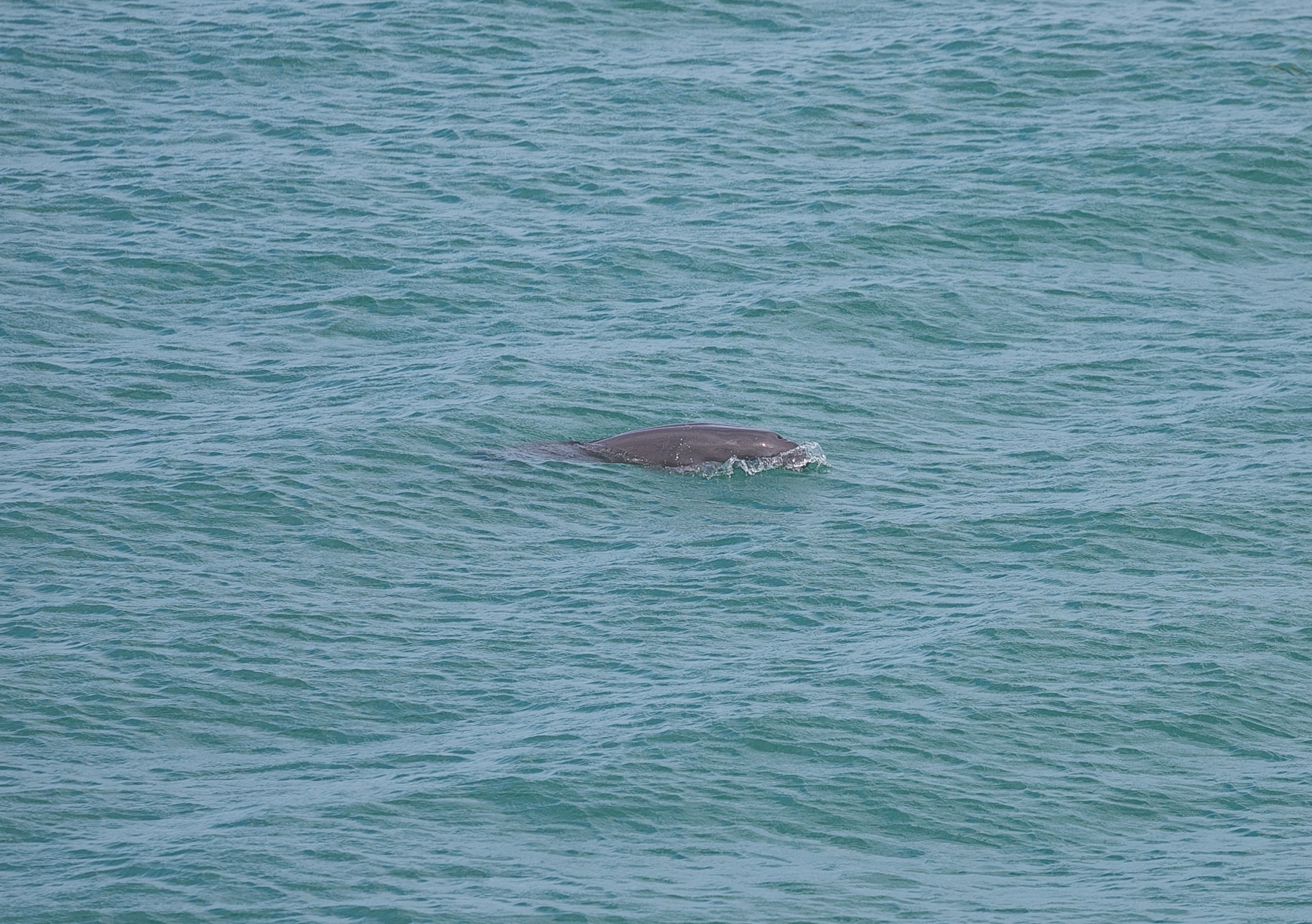
Off the coast of South Jeolla Province

The primary danger to the species is environmental degradation. Except for being briefly hunted after World War II due to the lack of seaworthy fishing boats, finless porpoises have never been widely hunted in Japan. It is a species protected since 1930 at the area around Awajima Island, Takehara and this coverage had since been extended to all Japanese coastal waters. A decline of over 50% over the last three generations has been noted in the species, and it is thus classified as Endangered. This decline is largely thought to be a consequence of intensified fishing activity, which has caused large amounts of porpoises to be entangled in gillnets. Habitat loss and pollution are also thought to be major threats.

Local conservation groups in Korea, such as at Yeosu, have started campaigning for the protection of the local populations. It is classed as a protected species in the country.

== See also ==
- List of cetaceans
