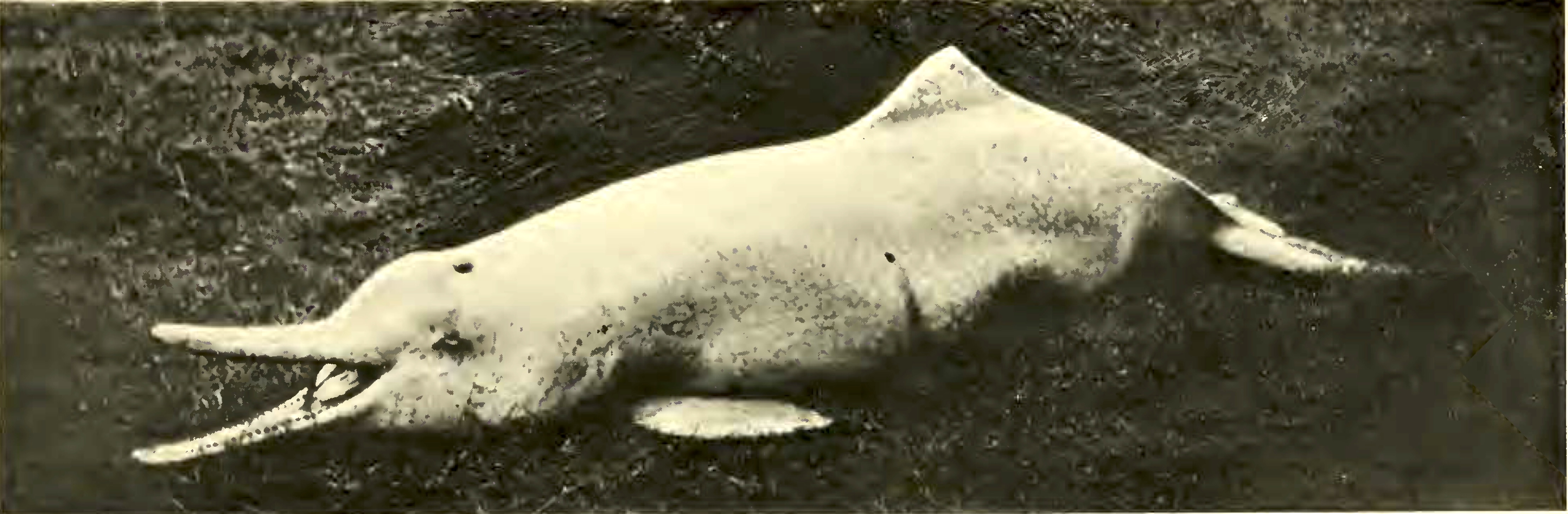
- Photograph from Miller's species description in 1918
- Size compared to an average human

Conservation status
- Critically endangered, possibly extinct (IUCN 3.1)
- CITES Appendix I

Scientific classification
- Kingdom: Animalia
- Phylum: Chordata
- Class: Mammalia
- Order: Artiodactyla
- Infraorder: Cetacea
- Clade: Delphinida
- Superfamily: Lipotoidea
- Family: Lipotidae
- Genus: Lipotes; Miller, 1918
- Species: L. vexillifer

Binomial name
- Lipotes vexillifer Miller, 1918
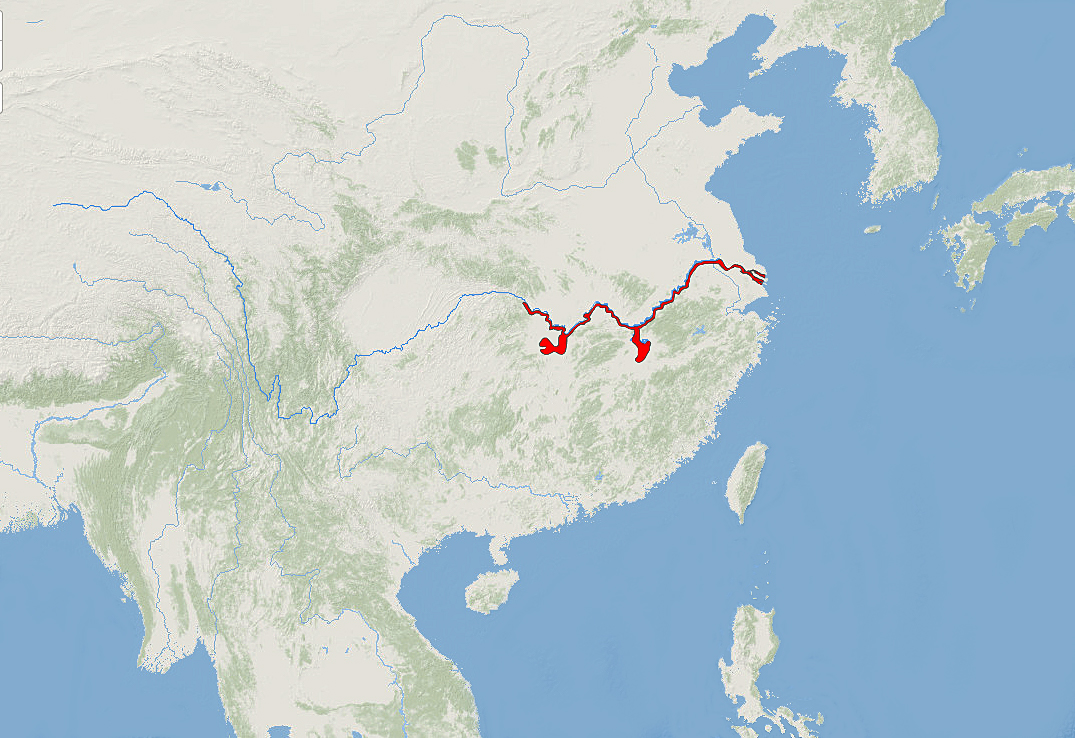
- Natural range of the baiji

= Baiji =

Baiji Temporal range: Late Miocene - recent Possibly extinct

Species of river dolphin

The baiji (Lipotes vexillifer) is a possibly extinct species of river dolphin native to the Yangtze river system in China. It is thought to possibly be the first dolphin species driven to extinction due to the impact of humans. This dolphin is listed as "critically endangered: possibly extinct" by the IUCN, has not been definitively seen in over 20 years, and several surveys of the Yangtze have failed to find it. The species is also called the Chinese river dolphin, Yangtze river dolphin, Yangtze dolphin, and whitefin dolphin. The genus name Lipotes means "left behind" and the species epithet vexillifer means "flag bearer". It is nicknamed the "Goddess of the Yangtze" and was regarded as the goddess of protection by local fishermen and boatmen. It is not to be confused with the Chinese white dolphin (Sousa chinensis) or the finless porpoise (Neophocaena). This is the only species in the genus Lipotes.

The baiji population declined drastically in decades as China industrialized and made heavy use of the river for fishing, transportation, and hydroelectricity. Following surveys in the Yangtze River during the 1980s, the baiji was claimed to be the first dolphin species in history driven to extinction by humans. A Conservation Action Plan for Cetaceans of the Yangtze River was approved by the Chinese Government in 2001. Efforts were made to conserve the species, but a late 2006 expedition failed to find any baiji in the river. Organizers declared the baiji functionally extinct. The baiji represents the first documented global extinction of an aquatic "megafaunal" vertebrate in over 50 years since the demise of the Japanese sea lion (Zalophus japonicus) and the Caribbean monk seal (Neomonachus tropicalis) in the 1950s. It also signified the disappearance of an entire mammal family of river dolphins (Lipotidae). The baiji's extinction would be the first recorded extinction of a well-studied cetacean species (it is unclear if some previously extinct varieties were species or subspecies) to be directly attributable to human influence. The baiji is one of a number of extinctions to have taken place due to the degradation of the Yangtze, alongside that of the Chinese paddlefish, as well as the now extinct in the wild Dabry's sturgeon.

Swiss economist and CEO of the baiji.org Foundation August Pfluger funded an expedition in which an international team, taken in part from the National Oceanic and Atmospheric Administration and the Fisheries Research Agency in Japan, searched for six weeks for signs of the dolphin. The search took place almost a decade after the last exploration in 1997, which turned up only 13 of the cetaceans.

In August 2007, a Chinese man reportedly videotaped a large white animal swimming in the Yangtze. Although the animal was tentatively identified as a baiji, the presence of only one or a few animals, particularly of advanced age, is not enough to save a functionally extinct species from true extinction. The last known living baiji was Qi Qi, who died in 2002. The World Wildlife Fund is calling for the preservation of any possible baiji habitat, in case the species is located and can be revived.

== Anatomy and morphology ==
Baiji were thought to breed in the first half of the year, the peak calving season being from February to April. A 30% pregnancy rate was observed. Gestation would last 10–11 months, delivering one calf at a time; the interbirth interval was 2 years. Calves measured around 80–90 centimetres (31–35 in) at birth, and nursed for 8–20 months. Males reached sexual maturity at age four, and females at age 6. Mature males were about 2.3 metres (7 ft 7 in) (7.5 ft) long, females 2.5 metres (8 ft 2 in), with the longest specimen 2.7 metres (8 ft 10 in). The animal weighed 135–230 kilograms (298–507 lb), with a lifespan estimated at 24 years in the wild. The Yangtze river dolphin was pale blue to grey on the dorsal (back) side, and white on the ventral (belly) side. It had a long and slightly upturned beak with 31–36 conical teeth on either jaw. Its dorsal fin was low and triangular in shape and resembled a light-colored flag when the dolphin swam just below the surface of the murky Yangtze River, hence the name "white-flag" dolphin. It had smaller eyes compared to oceanic dolphins.

When escaping from danger, the baiji can reach 60 km/h (37 mph), but usually stays within 30 to 40 km/h (19 to 25 mph). Because of its poor vision, the baiji relies primarily on sonar for navigation. The sonar system also plays an important role in socializing, predator avoidance, group coordination, and expressing emotions. Sound emission is focused and highly directed by the shape of the skull and melon. Peak frequencies of echolocation clicks are between 70 kHz and 100 kHz.

== Distribution ==
Historically, the baiji occurred along 1,700 kilometres (1,100 mi) of the middle and lower reaches of the Yangtze, from Yichang in the west to the mouth of the river near to Shanghai, as well as in Poyang and Dongting Lakes and the smaller Qiantang River to the south. This had been reduced by several hundred kilometres both upstream and downstream, and was limited to the main channel of the Yangtze, principally the middle reaches between the two large tributary lakes, Dongting and Poyang. Approximately 12% of the world's human population lives and works within the Yangtze River catchment area, putting pressure on the river.

== Evolutionary history ==
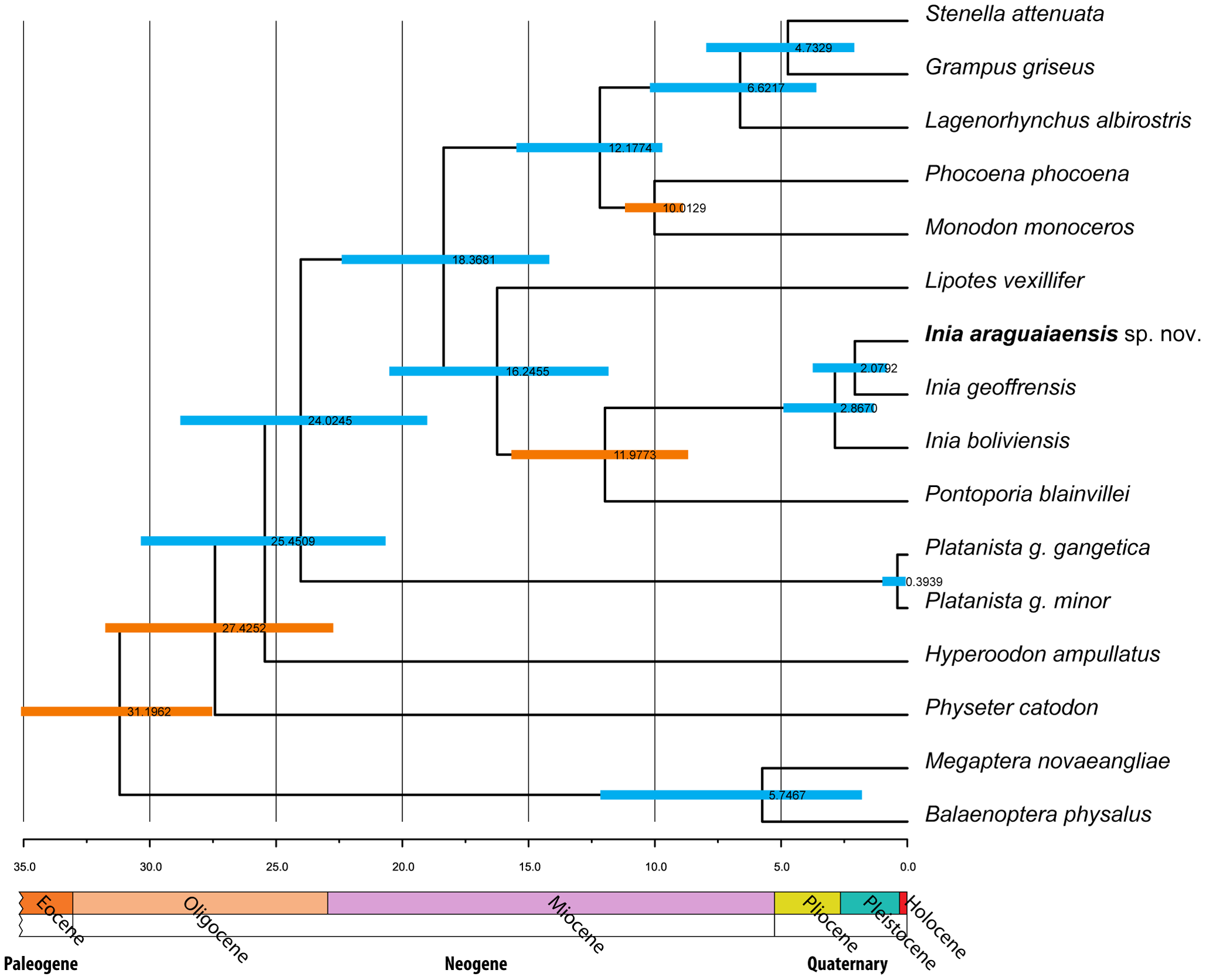
Relationships of the baiji (Lipotes) compared to other dolphins

The baiji is not closely related to any living species of dolphin, having diverged from the ancestors of the La Plata dolphin and Amazon river dolphin during the Miocene, estimated to be around 16 million years ago. The closest known relative of the baiji is Parapontoporia, native to the western coast of North America during the Latest Miocene and Pliocene. The baiji was one of five species of dolphins known to have made fresh water their exclusive habitat. The other five species, including the boto and the La Plata dolphin, have survived in the Río de la Plata and Amazon rivers in South America and the Ganges and Indus rivers on the Indian subcontinent.

It is well known that the river dolphins are not a natural group. Their mitochondrial genome reveals a split of two separate lineages, Platanista and Lipotes + (Inia + Pontoporia), having no sister relationship with each other, and the Platanista lineage is always within the odontocete clade instead of having a closer affinity to Mysticeti. The position of the Platanista is more basal, suggesting separate divergence of this lineage well before the other one. The Lipotes has a sister relationship with Inia + Pontoporia, and they together formed the sister group to the Delphinoidea. This result strongly supports paraphyly of the classical river dolphins, and the nonplatanistoid river dolphins do represent a monophyletic grouping, with the Lipotidae as the sister taxa to (Iniidae + Pontoporiidae), and is well congruent with the studies based on short interspersed repetitive elements (SINEs).

Low values of haplotype diversity and nucleotide diversity were found for the baiji of the Yangtze River. The analysis of molecular variance (AMOVA) supported a high level of overall genetic structure. The males having a higher genetic differentiation than the females suggested a significant female-biased dispersal.

The aquatic adaptations of the baiji and other cetaceans have happened slowly and can be linked to positively selected genes (PSGs) and/or other functional changes. Comparative genopic analyses have uncovered that the baiji have a slow molecular clock and molecular adaptations to their aquatic environment. This information leads scientists to conclude that a bottleneck must have occurred near the end of the last deglaciation, a time that coincided with rapid temperature decrease and a rise in eustatic sea level. Scientists have also looked into PSGs in the baiji genome which are used for DNA repair and response to DNA stimulus. These PSGs have not been found in any other mammal species. Pathways being used for DNA repair have been known to have a major impact on brain development and have been implicated in diseases including microcephaly. The slow down of the substitution rate among cetaceans may have been affected by the evolution of DNA damage pathways. Over time, river dolphins, including the baiji, have had a reduction in the size of their eyes and the acuity of their vision. This probably stems from poor visibility in fluvial and estuarine environments. When analyzing the baiji genome, scientists have found that there are four genes that have lost their function due to a frameshift mutation or premature stop codons. The baiji has the lowest single-nucleotide polymorphism (SNP) frequency reported thus far among mammals. This low frequency could be related to the relatively low rate of molecular evolution in cetaceans; however, considering that the decrease in the rate of molecular evolution in the baiji was not as great as the decrease in heterozygosity rate, it is likely that much of the low genetic diversity observed was caused by the precipitous decline in the total baiji population in recent decades and the associated breedings.

The reconstructed demographic history over the last 100,000 years featured a continual population contraction through the last glacial maximum, a serious bottleneck during the last deglaciation, and sustained population growth after the eustatic sea level approached the current levels. The close correlation between population trends, regional temperatures, and eustatic sea levels suggest a dominant role for global and local climate changes in shaping the baiji's ancient population demography.

== Folklore ==
Per Chinese folklore, a beautiful young girl is said to have lived with her stepfather on the banks of the river Yangtze. He was evil, a greedy man out for his own self-interest. One day, he took the girl on a boat, intending to sell her on the market. Out on the river, though, he became infatuated with her beauty and tried to take advantage of her. But she freed herself by plunging into the river, whereupon a big storm came and sank the boat. After the storm had thus settled, people saw a beautiful dolphin swimming – the incarnation of the girl – which became known as the "Goddess of the Yangtze". The baiji, in the region of Yangtze, is regarded as a symbol of peace and prosperity.

== In popular culture ==
The baiji has been featured in pop culture and media on many occasions due to its status as a Chinese national treasure and as a critically endangered species. There have been various stamps and coins that feature the Yangtze river dolphin. Prior to Minecon Earth 2018, the baiji was featured in a promotional poll in which Chinese players would guess which culturally significant Chinese animal would be added to Minecraft. The 2024 Hangzhou Super Cup, a canoeing event in China, featured a baiji named "豚豚" (tún tún) as the mascot for the event.

== Conservation ==
In the 1950s, the population was estimated at 6,000 animals, but declined rapidly over the subsequent five decades. Only a few hundred were left by 1970. The number fell to 400 by the 1980s and then to 13 in 1997 when a full-fledged search was conducted. The baiji was last sighted in August 2004, though there have been many alleged sightings since. It is listed as an endangered species by the U.S. government under the Endangered Species Act. It is now thought to be functionally extinct.

=== Causes of decline ===
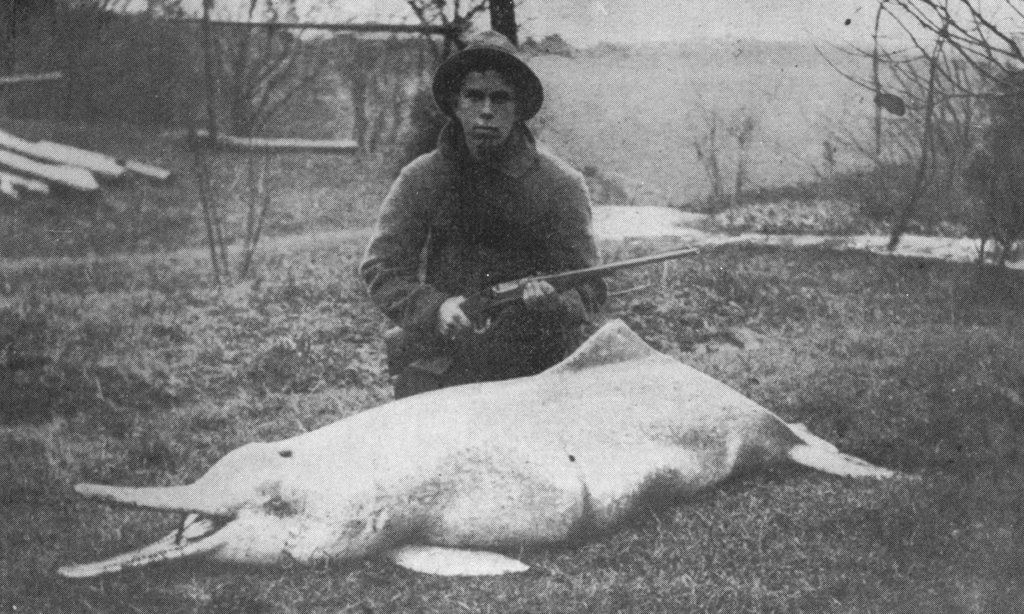
Baiji killed by Charles Hoy in 1914

The World Conservation Union (IUCN) has noted the following as threats to the species: a period of hunting by humans during the Great Leap Forward, entanglement in fishing gear, the illegal practice of electric fishing, collisions with boats and ships, habitat loss, and pollution. Further studies have noted that a lack of information on the baiji's historical distribution or ecology, the environmental impact of the construction of the Three Gorges Dam on the living space of the baiji, and the failure to act for the protection of the baiji are also threats to the species.

During the Great Leap Forward, when traditional veneration of the baiji was denounced, it was hunted for its flesh and skin, and quickly became scarce.

As China developed economically, pressure on the Yangtze river dolphin grew significantly. Industrial and residential waste flowed into the Yangtze. The riverbed was dredged and reinforced with concrete in many locations. Ship traffic multiplied, boats grew in size, and fishermen employed wider and more lethal nets. Noise pollution caused the nearly blind animal to collide with propellers. Stocks of the dolphin's prey declined drastically in the late 20th century, with some fish populations declining to one thousandth of their pre-industrial levels.

A range of anthropogenic-led causes (e.g. boat collisions, dam construction) which also threaten freshwater cetaceans in other river systems have been implicated in the decline of the baiji population. However, the primary factor was probably unsustainable by-catch in local fisheries, which use rolling hooks, nets (gill nets and fyke nets), and electrofishing; similarly, by-catch constitutes the principal cause of mortality in many populations of small cetaceans worldwide. Although there is relatively few data available on baiji mortality, at least half of all known baiji deaths in the 1970s and 1980s were caused by rolling hooks and other fishing gear, and electrofishing accounted for 40% of baiji deaths recorded during the 1990s. Unlike most historical-era extinctions of large-bodied animals, the baiji was the victim not of active persecution but of incidental mortality resulting from massive-scale human environmental impacts, primarily uncontrolled fishing.

Its extinction merely reflects the latest stage in the progressive ecological deterioration of the Yangtze region. In the 1970s and 1980s, an estimated half of baiji deaths were attributed to entanglement in fishing gear and nets. By the early 2000s, electric fishing was considered "the most important and immediate direct threat to the baiji's survival". Though outlawed, this fishing technique is widely and illegally practiced throughout China. The building of the Three Gorges Dam further reduced the dolphin's habitat and facilitated an increase in ship traffic. These impacts were thought to make it extinct in the wild.

There are some scientists who have found that pollution has resulted in emerging diseases caused by parasitic infection in the baiji population. The baiji's reliance on aquatic environments could have resulted in interaction with both terrestrial and marine pathogen risks. Since the baiji has a limited distribution endemic to the Yangtze River, the freshwater environment may have a higher pathogen level than marine waters (although systematic environmental studies have yet to be conducted). The pathogens in these waters could lead to viral infections that can result in epizootics, which has caused the deaths of thousands of marine mammals over the last 20 years. There have also been captured/killed individuals that have had helminth infestations in the stomach, which leads scientists to believe that parasitic infections could be another cause of decline amongst the baiji.

It has been noted, however, that the declining geographical range that baiji have been spotted in is not connected to the population loss of baiji. A model provided by Yangtze fishing communities show that the baiji population was not connected by geographical range or fragmentation of location, as the baiji make long-term and periodic movements throughout several years. The movements of the baiji left the species unaffected by dwindling geographical range.

=== Surveys ===
Results of Yangtze River baiji surveys between 1979 and 1996 (* Lower reaches only)
Year	Survey Area	No. of km surveyed	No. of baiji sighted	No. of baiji estimated
1979	Wuhan-Chenglingji	230	19	–
1979	Nanjing-Taiyangzhou	170	10	–
1979–1981	Nanjing-Guichi	250	3–6 groups	400
1978–1985	Yichang-Nantong	1600	>20 groups	156
1985–1986	Yichang-Jiangyin	1510	42 groups	300
1979–1986	Fujiangsha-Hukou	630	78–79	100*
1987–1990	Yichang-Shanghai	1669	108	200
1989–1991	Hukou-Zhenjian	500	29	120
1991–1996	Xinchang-Wuhan	413	42	<10

=== Conservation efforts ===
During the 1970s, China recognized the precarious state of the Yangtze river dolphin. The government outlawed deliberate killing, restricted fishing, and established nature reserves.

In 1978, the Chinese Academy of Sciences established the Freshwater Dolphin Research Centre as a branch of the Wuhan Institute of Hydrobiology. In the 1980s and 1990s, several attempts were made to capture dolphins and relocate them to a reserve. A breeding program would then allow the species to recover and be reintroduced to the Yangtze after conditions improve. However, capturing the rare, quick dolphins proved to be difficult, and few captives survived more than a few months.

The first Chinese aquatic species protection organisation, the Baiji Dolphin Conservation Foundation of Wuhan (武汉白鱀豚保护基金), was founded in December 1996. It has raised 1,383,924.35 CNY (about US$100,000) and used the funds for in vitro cell preservation and to maintain the baiji facilities, including the Shishou Sanctuary that was flooded in 1998.

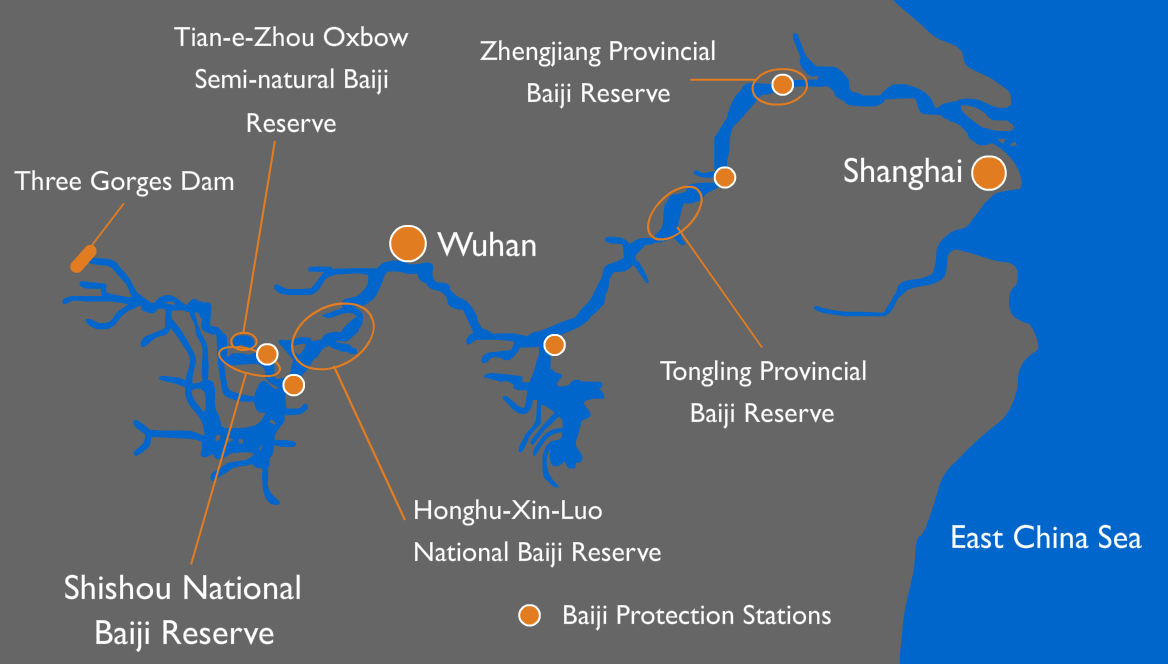
Conservation efforts of the baiji along the Yangtze River

Since 1992, five protected areas of the Yangtze have been designated as baiji reserves. Four were built in the main Yangtze channel where baiji are actively protected and fishing is banned: two national reserves (Shishou City and Xin-Luo) and two provincial (Tongling and Zhenjiang). In the past 20 years, five nature reserves have been established along the river. Imposing maximum prohibition of harmful and illegal fishing methods in the reserves might prolong the process of extinction of these cetaceans in the wild, but so far, the administrative measures taken in the reserves have not yet kept the baiji population from sharply declining. As humans continue to occupy the river and use the natural resources it provides, the question as to whether the river itself can reach a point later in the future to become a habitat for these species to live in once again remains, for the most part, unanswered by conservationists. In Shishou, Hubei Province, and Tongling, Anhui Province, the two semi-natural reserves established in these regions aimed to build in an environment for the baiji, as well as another mammalian species, the Yangtze finless porpoise, to breed. Through careful management, both these species not only survived, but did in fact reproduce successfully enough to provide some hope that the baiji may be able to make a comeback.

The fifth protected area is an isolated oxbow lake located off of the north bank of the river near to Shishou City: the Tian-e-Zhou Oxbow Semi-natural Reserve. Combined, these five reserves cover just over 350 kilometres (220 mi), about 1/3 of the baijis' range, leaving two-thirds of the species' habitat unprotected.

As well as these five protected areas, there are also five "Protection Stations" in Jianli, Chenglingji, Hukou, Wuhu, and Zhengjiang. These stations consist of two observers and a motorized fishing boat, with the aim of conducting daily patrols, making observations, and investigating reports of illegal fishing.

In 2001, the Chinese government approved a Conservation Action Plan for Cetaceans of the Yangtze River. This plan re-emphasised the three measures identified at the 1986 workshop and was adopted as the national policy for the conservation of the Baiji. Despite all of these workshops and conventions, little money was available in China to aid the conservation efforts. It has been estimated that US$1 million was needed to begin the project and maintain it for a further 3 years.

Efforts to save the mammals proved to be too little and too late. August Pfluger, chief executive of the Baiji.org Foundation, said, "The strategy of the Chinese government was a good one, but we didn't have time to put it into action." Furthermore, the conservation attempts have been criticized, as even with the international attention about the need for conservation for the baiji, the Chinese government did not "[make] any serious investment" to protect the baiji.

==== In situ and ex situ conservation ====
Most scientists agreed that the best course of action was an ex situ effort working in parallel with an in situ effort. The deterioration of the Yangtze River had to be reversed to preserve the habitat. The ex situ projects aimed to raise a large enough population over time so that some, if not all, of the dolphins could be returned to the Yangtze, so the habitat within the river had to be maintained anyway.

The Shishou Tian-e-Zhou is a 21-kilometre (13 mi) long, 2-kilometre (1.2 mi) wide oxbow lake located near Shishou City in Hubei Province. Shishou has been described as being "like a miniature Yangtze ... possessing all of the requirements for a semi-natural reserve". From the designation as a national reserve in 1992, it has been intended to be used for not only the baiji but also the Yangtze finless porpoise. In 1990, the first finless porpoises were relocated to the reserve and since then have been surviving and reproducing well. As of April 2005, 26 finless porpoises were known to live in the reserve. A baiji was introduced in December 1995, but died during the summer flood of 1996. To deal with these annual floods, a dyke was constructed between the Yangtze and Shishou. Now water is controlled from a sluice gate located at the downstream mouth of the oxbow lake. It has been reported that since the installation of this sluice gate, water quality has declined since no annual transfer of nutrients can occur. Roughly 6,700 people live on the island within the oxbow lake, and so some limited fishing is permitted.

The success of Shishou with the porpoises and with migratory birds and other wetland fauna encouraged the local Wetlands Management Team to put forward an application to award the site Ramsar status. It has also been noted that the site has incredible potential for ecotourism, which could be used to generate much needed revenue to improve the quality of the reserve. The necessary infrastructure does not currently exist to realize these opportunities.

==== Captive specimens ====
A baiji conservation dolphinarium was established at the Institute of Hydrobiology (IHB) in Wuhan in 1980, and rebuilt in 1992. This was planned as a backup to any other conservation efforts by producing an area completely protected from any threats, and where the baiji could be easily observed. The site included an indoor and outdoor holding pool, a water filtration system, food storage and preparation facilities, research labs, and a small museum. The aim was to also generate income from tourism which could be put towards the baiji plight. The pools were not very large (25 metres (82 ft) arc [kidney shaped] × 7 metres (23 ft) wide × 3.5 metres (11 ft) deep, 10 metres (33 ft) diameter, 2 metres (6 ft 7 in) deep, and 12 metres (39 ft) diameter, 3.5 metres (11 ft) deep) and would not be capable of holding many baijis at once.

Douglas Adams and Mark Carwardine documented their encounters with the endangered animals on their conservation travels for the BBC programme Last Chance to See. They came across baiji weighing scales and baiji fertilizer. They met Qi Qi, who was just a year old then, injured by fishing hooks in 1980, and taken into captivity to be nursed back to health. The book by the same name, published in 1990, included pictures of the captive specimen. Qi Qi lived in the Wuhan Institute of Hydrobiology dolphinarium from 1980 to July 14, 2002. Discovered by a fisherman in Dongting Lake, he became the sole resident of the Baiji Dolphinarium beside East Lake. A sexually mature female was captured in late 1995, but died after half a year in 1996 when the Tian-e-Zhou Oxbow Nature Reserve, which had contained only finless porpoises since 1990, was flooded.

Details of captive baijis (IHB = Institute of Hydrobiology, NNU = Nanjing Normal University, NFRI = Nanjing Fisheries Research Institute)
Name	Date range	Location	Sex	Conditions of rearing	Survival time
Qi Qi	1980-01-12 – 2002-07-14	IHB	M	Outdoor and indoor, non-filtered	22.5 years
Rong Rong	1981-04-22 – 1982-02-03	IHB	M	Outdoor non-filtered	228 days
Lian Lian	1986-03-31 – 1986-06-14	IHB	M	Outdoor non-filtered	76 days
Zhen Zhen	1986-03-31 – 1988-09-27	IHB	F	Outdoor non-filtered	2.5 years
Su Su	1981-03-03 – 1981-03-20	NNU	F	Indoor	17 days
Jiang Jiang	1981-12-07 – 1982-04-16	NFRI	M	Outdoor non-filtered	129 days

=== The 2006 expedition and aftermath ===
The Xinhua News Agency announced on December 4, 2006 that no Chinese river dolphins were detected in a six-week survey of the Yangtze River conducted by 30 researchers. The failure of the Yangtze Freshwater Dolphin Expedition raised suspicions of the first unequivocal extinction of a cetacean species due to human action (some extinct baleen whale populations may not have been distinct species). Poor water and weather conditions may have prevented sightings, but expedition leaders declared it "functionally extinct" on December 13, 2006, as fewer are likely to be alive than are needed to propagate the species. However, footage believed to be a baiji from August 2007 was released to the public.

The Japanese sea lion and Caribbean monk seal disappeared in the 1950s, the most recent aquatic mammals to become extinct. Several land-based mammal species and subspecies have disappeared since then. If the baiji is extinct, the vaquita (Phocoena sinus) has become the most endangered marine mammal species.

Some scientists retain hope for the species:

The fact that the expedition didn't see any baiji dolphins during this expedition does not necessarily mean that the species is extinct or even 'effectively extinct', because it covered a considerable distance in a relatively short period of time... However, we are extremely concerned. The Yangtze is highly degraded, and we spotted dramatically fewer finless porpoises than we have in the past.

— Wang Limin, director of the World Wide Fund for Nature, Wuhan office

A report of the expedition was published online in the journal Biology Letters on August 7, 2007, in which the authors conclude "We are forced to conclude that the baiji is now likely to be extinct, probably due to unsustainable by-catch in local fisheries".

"Witness to Extinction: How We Failed To Save The Yangtze River Dolphin", an account of the 2006 baiji survey by Samuel Turvey, the lead author of the Biology Letters paper, was published by Oxford University Press in autumn 2008. This book investigated the baiji's probable extinction within the wider-scale context of how and why international efforts to conserve the species had failed, and whether conservation recovery programmes for other threatened species were likely to face similar potentially disastrous administrative hurdles.

Some reports suggest that information about the baiji and its demise is being suppressed in China. Other reports cite government media English-language reports in China Central Television and Xinhua News Agency as evidence to the contrary.

=== Sightings ===
In August 2007, Zeng Yujiang reportedly videotaped a large white animal swimming in the Yangtze in Anhui Province. Wang Kexiong of the Institute of Hydrobiology of the Chinese Academy of Sciences has tentatively confirmed that the animal on the video is a baiji.

In October 2016 several news sources announced a recent sighting of what has been speculated to be a baiji. However, the purported re-discovery was disputed by the conservation biologist Samuel Turvey, who was a member of the 2006 survey team. Turvey instead proposed to shift conservation focus to the critically endangered Yangtze finless porpoise, the only freshwater cetaceans left in China.

There was a sighting claimed to belong to baiji surfacing along with a pod of finless porpoises at Tongling in Anhui province in April 2018.

On May 14, 2024, The Paper reported a suspected sighting of two baijis in the Yangtze.

== See also ==
- Environmental issues in China
- Ganges shark – Another critically endangered freshwater animal in Asia
- Vaquita – Another critically endangered/functionally extinct cetacean
- Holocene extinction – Ongoing mass extinction event primarily caused by human activity
- List of cetaceans
- List of endangered and protected species of China
- Wildlife of China
