= Shishou =

Shishou 石首市 Shihshow
- County-level city
- Location in Hubei
- Coordinates (Shishou government): 29°43′15″N 112°25′31″E
- Country: People's Republic of China
- Province: Hubei
- Prefecture-level city: Jingzhou

Area
  - Urban: 22.56 km^{2} (8.71 sq mi)

Population (2020)
  - County-level city: 473,707
  - Urban: 240,082
- Time zone: UTC+8 (China Standard)

Shishou ([ʂɨ̌.ʂòʊ]; Chinese: 石首) is a county-level city under the administration of the prefectural-level city Jingzhou, in the south of Hubei province, near its border with Hunan province, and is located in the middle reaches of the Yangtze River. The Swan Islet Wetland of the Yangtze River in this area is the world's largest national natural reserve both for wild elks(Milu, or David Deer) and for Chinese river dolphins (finless porpoises). The Shishou City National Baiji Reserve for Chinese river dolphins is nearby. It shares its name with a stream flowing into the Yangtze River. In addition, the area enjoys convenient transportation, with an hour's drive from Yueyang East Railway Station on the Beijing-Guangzhou high-speed railway line (90 kilometers (56 mi) of expressway), and 70 kilometers (43 mi) from Jingzhou Railway Station on the Shanghai-Wuhan-Chengdu high-speed railway line. Moreover, Shishou boasts a diversified landscape, including mountains, hills, lakes, rivers, terraces and plains, as well as abundant resources such as rice, cotton, oil plants, eggs, fish, and lotus roots.

== Geography ==
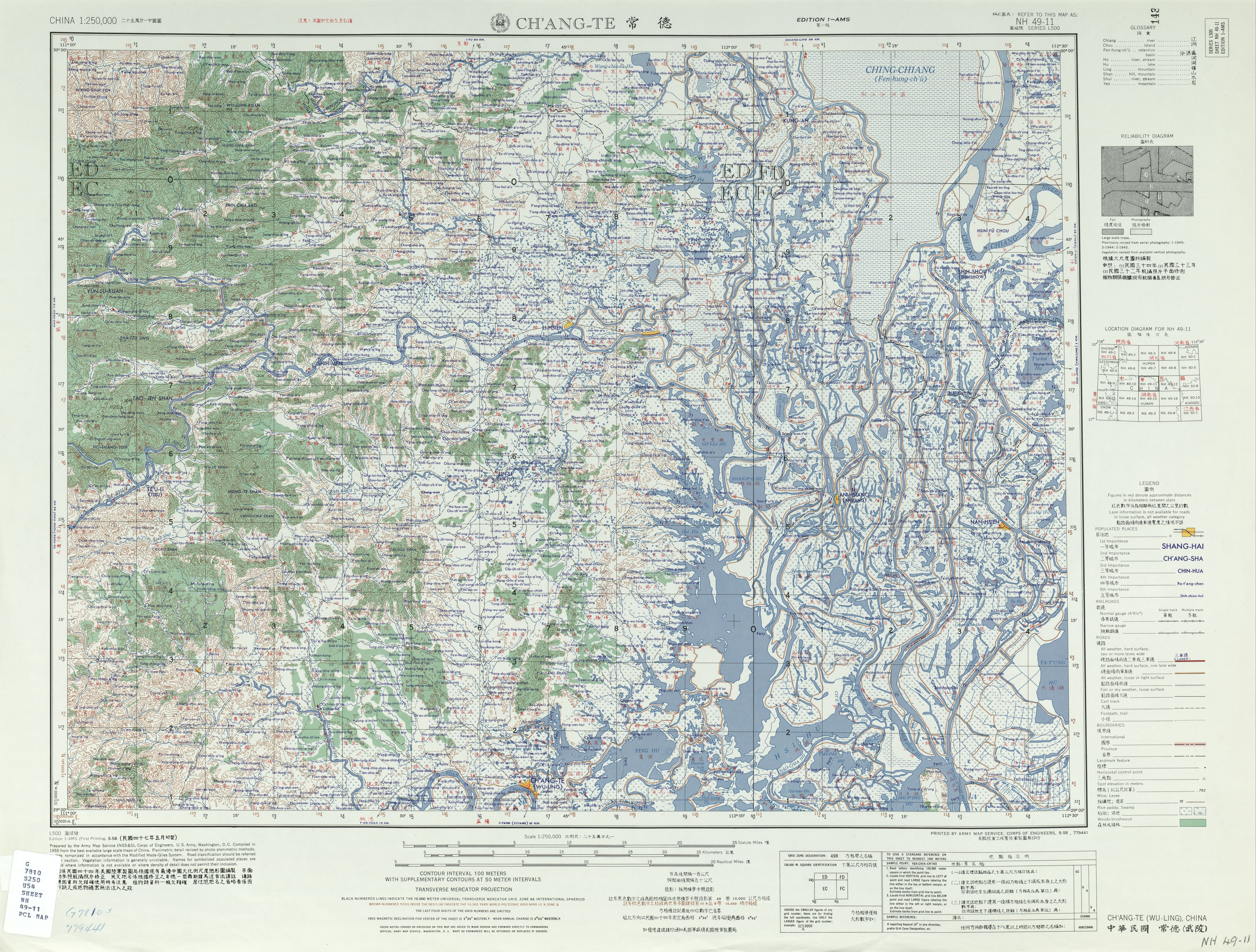
Map including Shishou (labeled as SHIH-SHOU (SHIHSHOW) 石首) (1953)

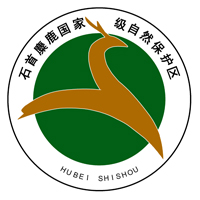
Shishou Père David's Deer Protection Area

Shishou is in a subtropical monsoon climate zone with an abundant amount of light and heat energy and a long frost-free period. The city receives 1800–2000 hours of sunshine annually, with an annual average temperature of 15.9-16.6 °C, 10 °C or higher accumulated temperature annually, an annual frost-free period of 242–263 days, and an average annual precipitation between 1100mm and 1300 mm. The climatic resources are sufficient for a large variety of crops to grow. Because of the climatic condition of hydro-thermal synchronization during agricultural production seasons, Shishou provides the optimal climate to grow a variety of crops between April and October (80% of the annual precipitation, 75% of annual solar radiation, and 80% of annual accumulated temperature that is greater than 10 °C). The climate is particularly complex in the vicinity of 30 degrees north latitude. Situated far in the Inland, Shishou's climate is minimally affected by the sea, which contributes to its typical continental climate.

== Climate ==
Climate data for Shishou, elevation 37 m (121 ft), (1991–2020 normals, extremes 1981–present)
Month	Jan	Feb	Mar	Apr	May	Jun	Jul	Aug	Sep	Oct	Nov	Dec	Year
Record high °C (°F)	22.0 (71.6)	27.3 (81.1)	30.6 (87.1)	33.9 (93.0)	35.6 (96.1)	36.7 (98.1)	38.0 (100.4)	38.0 (100.4)	38.9 (102.0)	33.5 (92.3)	29.4 (84.9)	22.4 (72.3)	38.9 (102.0)
Mean daily maximum °C (°F)	8.2 (46.8)	11.1 (52.0)	15.7 (60.3)	22.0 (71.6)	26.7 (80.1)	29.8 (85.6)	32.4 (90.3)	32.0 (89.6)	28.3 (82.9)	23.0 (73.4)	16.9 (62.4)	10.9 (51.6)	21.4 (70.6)
Daily mean °C (°F)	4.6 (40.3)	7.2 (45.0)	11.5 (52.7)	17.5 (63.5)	22.3 (72.1)	25.9 (78.6)	28.6 (83.5)	28.0 (82.4)	23.9 (75.0)	18.5 (65.3)	12.5 (54.5)	7.0 (44.6)	17.3 (63.1)
Mean daily minimum °C (°F)	2.0 (35.6)	4.2 (39.6)	8.3 (46.9)	13.9 (57.0)	18.8 (65.8)	22.8 (73.0)	25.5 (77.9)	25.0 (77.0)	20.7 (69.3)	15.2 (59.4)	9.3 (48.7)	4.0 (39.2)	14.1 (57.5)
Record low °C (°F)	−8.4 (16.9)	−4.5 (23.9)	−2.5 (27.5)	2.3 (36.1)	9.4 (48.9)	12.7 (54.9)	19.2 (66.6)	16.5 (61.7)	10.5 (50.9)	2.5 (36.5)	−1.5 (29.3)	−7.3 (18.9)	−8.4 (16.9)
Average precipitation mm (inches)	55.3 (2.18)	67.0 (2.64)	104.7 (4.12)	143.9 (5.67)	172.7 (6.80)	199.1 (7.84)	179.8 (7.08)	115.7 (4.56)	72.9 (2.87)	80.8 (3.18)	71.0 (2.80)	31.8 (1.25)	1,294.7 (50.99)
Average precipitation days (≥ 0.1 mm)	10.0	10.7	13.7	13.4	13.3	12.1	10.5	9.1	8.1	9.9	9.7	7.7	128.2
Average snowy days	4.6	2.8	1.1	0	0	0	0	0	0	0	0.2	1.5	10.2
Average relative humidity (%)	77	77	78	79	78	82	81	81	78	77	78	74	78
Mean monthly sunshine hours	83.4	83.0	109.4	131.7	151.4	149.5	208.1	205.3	151.3	134.7	119.4	105.1	1,632.3
Percentage possible sunshine	26	26	29	34	36	36	49	51	41	38	38	33	36
Source: China Meteorological Administration all-time extreme temperature

== Administration ==
The city of Shishou has direct jurisdiction over 2 subdistricts, 11 towns, 1 townships, and 1 economic and technological development zone:

Subdivision	Simplified Chinese	Pinyin	Population (2010 Census)	Area (km²)	Village Committees
City Proper
Xiulin Subdistrict	绣林街道	Xiùlín Jiēdào	70587	35.9	4
Biheshan Subdistrict	笔架山街道	Bǐjiàshān Jiēdào	70068	56	11
Suburban and rural
Xinchang	新厂镇	Xīnchǎng Zhèn	43314	94.6	19
Henggoushi	横沟市镇	Hénggōushì Zhèn	38521	82	18
Xiaohekou	小河口镇	Xiǎohékǒu Zhèn	38401	226.5	23
Taohuashan	桃花山镇	Táohuāshān Zhèn	21979	99.8	17
Tiaoguan	调关镇	Tiáoguān Zhèn	45189	107.9	21
Dongsheng	东升镇	Dōngshēng Zhèn	62620	173.1	33
Gaojimiao	高基庙镇	Gāojīmiào Zhèn	45562	76	21
Nankou	南口镇	Nánkǒu Zhèn	30388	97.4	17
Gaoling	高陵镇	Gāolíng Zhèn	35036	82	24
Tuanshansi	团山寺镇	Tuánshānsì Zhèn	31329	67	18
Dayuan	大垸镇	Dàyuàn Zhèn	52788	146	25
Jiuheyuan	久合垸乡	Jiǔhéyuàn Xiāng	25312	54	17
Tian'ezhou	天鹅洲	Tiān'ézhōu	17	77.5	6

== 2009 Shishou incident ==
In June 2009, Shishou was rocked by violent protest after a man, Tu Yuangao, was found dead, supposedly due to suicide, outside the Yonglong hotel. The hotel is owned by a relative of Shishou's mayor. Tu, 24, was the hotel's chef. Fearing a cover-up, Tu's family refused to accept that his death was a suicide, and guarded his body while awaiting investigation. When police tried to forcefully remove Tu's body, local residents joined Tu's family, blocking the hotel entrance from the police. On June 19 a large number of local residents guarded the hotel, fighting with the police, including armed police. Confrontations between the police and residents continued outside the hotel, and on June 20, the municipal government began cutting internet connections in Shishou. On June 21, the police managed to break through the crowd and took Tu's corpse to a crematorium, apparently without giving the family the investigation it had requested.
