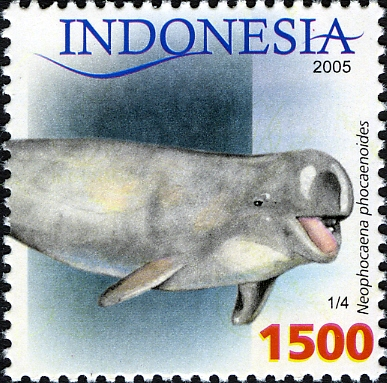
- Illustration for an Indonesian stamp

Conservation status
- Vulnerable (IUCN 3.1)
- CITES Appendix I

Scientific classification
- Kingdom: Animalia
- Phylum: Chordata
- Class: Mammalia
- Infraclass: Placentalia
- Order: Artiodactyla
- Infraorder: Cetacea
- Family: Phocoenidae
- Genus: Neophocaena
- Species: N. phocaenoides

Binomial name
- Neophocaena phocaenoides (G. Cuvier, 1829)
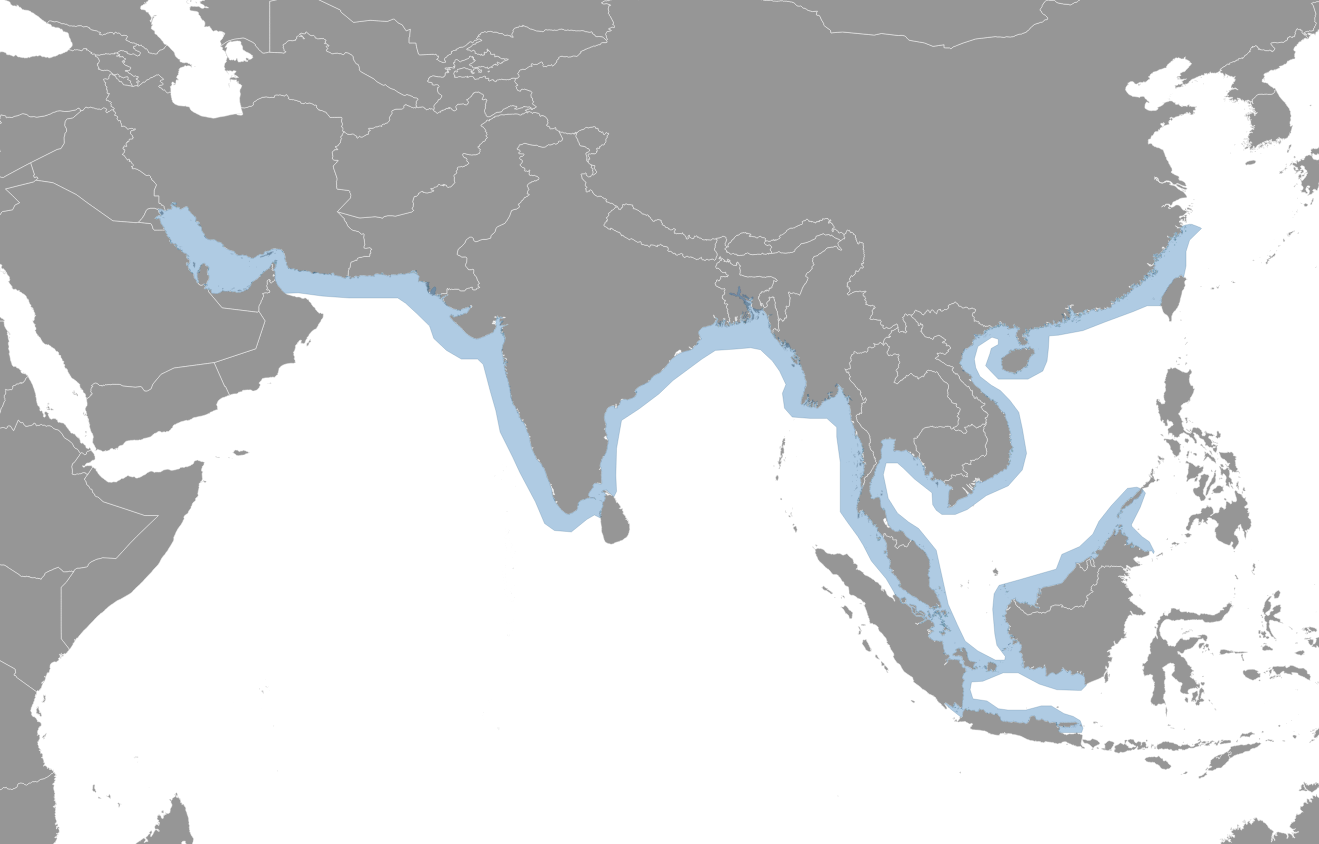

= Indo-Pacific finless porpoise =

Species of porpoise

The Indo-Pacific finless porpoise (Neophocaena phocaenoides) is one of eight porpoise species. The species ranges throughout most of the Indian Ocean, as well as the tropical and subtropical Pacific from Indonesia north to the Taiwan Strait. Overlapping with this species in the Taiwan Strait and replacing it northwards is the East Asian finless porpoise (N. sunameri).

== Distribution ==
The Indo-Pacific finless porpoise lives in the coastal waters of Asia, especially around Indonesia, Malaysia, India, and Bangladesh. At the western end, their range includes the length of the western coast of India and continues up into the Persian Gulf. On the eastern edge of their range, they are found throughout the Indonesian archipelago and range north to the Taiwan Strait. Finless porpoises are also one of the species protected at Sundarbans National Park.

== Description ==
Size compared to an average human

Finless porpoises can grow to as much as 2.27 m (7 ft 5 in) in length, and can weigh up to 72 kg (159 lb), although the majority are smaller. The flippers are moderately large, reaching up to 20% of the total body length. Adults are typically a uniform, light grey colour, although some may have lighter patches of skin around the mouth or darker patches in front of the flippers. Newborn calves of the central and eastern subspecies are mostly black with grey around the dorsal ridge area, becoming fully grey after four to six months. However, newborn calves of the western subspecies are a light creamy grey, and become darker as they age.

Adults grow more than 1.55 m (5 ft) in length and up to 30–45 kg (65–100 lb) in weight.

=== Internal anatomy ===
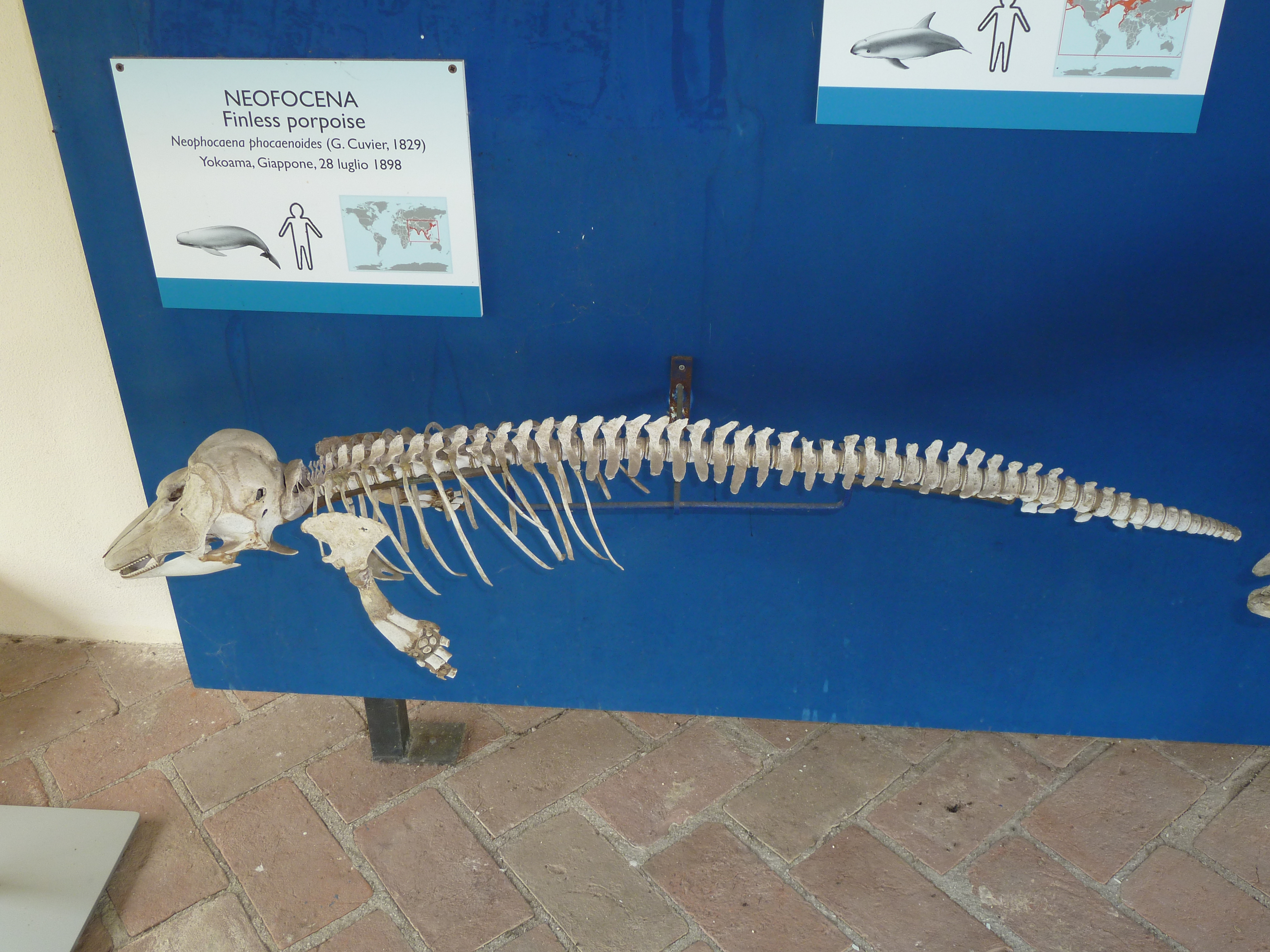
Skeleton in the collection of Museo di storia naturale e del territorio dell'Università di Pisa

The anatomy of finless porpoises has been relatively well studied, compared with that of some other cetacean species. For example, the tubercles along the dorsal ridge are known to contain numerous nerve endings that may possess a sensory function. The auditory system also appears well-developed, with numerous large nerve fibres specialised for rapid communication between the ears and the brain. On the other hand, sight is relatively poor, with a reduced lens and a limited number of fibres in the optic nerve and to the muscles moving the eyes.

The skeleton is unusually light, accounting for only 5% of total weight. There are between 58 and 65 vertebrae, about half of them in the tail, and with the first three cervical vertebrae fused into a single structure. There are ten to fourteen pairs of ribs in the chest, and an additional set of vestigial ribs has sometimes been reported in the neck, in association with the seventh cervical vertebra. There are 44 sets of spinal nerves.

The nasal passage contains nine or ten air sacs, which have a complicated structure, and are capable of sealing off all air within the passage. Behind these are an additional set of vomeronasal sacs. The trachea, however, is short, with only four cartilaginous rings. The stomach has three chambers, there is no caecum, and no distinct difference between the small and large intestines.

== Diet ==
Finless porpoises are opportunistic feeders using various kinds of available food items available in their habitat, including fish, crustaceans, and cephalopods. They are reported to eat fish, shrimp and squid off Pakistan. Seasonal changes in their diets have not been studied. They also apparently ingest some plant material when living in estuaries, mangroves, and rivers, including leaves, rice, and eggs deposited on vegetation.

== Behaviour ==
Recent data suggest the basic unit of a finless porpoise pod is a mother/calf pair or two adults, and schools of three or more individuals are aggregations of these units or of solitary individuals. Social structure seems to be underdeveloped in the species, and the mother/calf pair is probably the only stable social unit.

Like other porpoises, their behaviour tends to be not as energetic and showy as that of dolphins. They do not ride bow waves, and in some areas appear to be shy of boats.

Finless porpoises make both high frequency clicking sounds, and longer, low frequency tones, the latter perhaps being for communication, rather than echolocation. The clicks are narrow-band, with peaks of over 100 kHz.

A new study from Woods Hole Oceanographic Institution (WHOI) study that was published in The Journal of Experimental Biology, "highlights the differences in dolphins' ability to hear across species, reshaping the previous 'one-size-fits-all' approach taken on the hearing ability of the cetaceans".

=== Swimming style ===
Although they show no acrobatics in the water, finless porpoises are believed to be very active swimmers. They typically swim just beneath the surface of the water and roll to one side when surfacing to breathe. This rolling movement disturbs very little water on the surface, so they are often overlooked when rising to breathe. Surfacing generally lasts for one minute, as they take three to four quick successive breaths, then quickly submerge into the water. They often surface a great distance from the point where they dive beneath the water's surface. Dives lasting over four minutes have been recorded, and a common pattern of behaviour is to take one long dive, followed by two shorter ones.

=== Reproduction ===
Breeding occurs in late spring and early summer.. The young are born in spring, summer, or winter, depending on the geographic locality, after a gestation period of ten to eleven months. Newborn finless porpoises are reported to 72 to 84 cm (28 to 33 in) in length. Males reach sexual maturity at four to six years of age, and females at six to nine years. Finless porpoises have lived up to 33 years.

It has been claimed that young calves cling to the denticulated area of skin on their mother's back and are carried by her as she swims, but there is no clear evidence of this happening. Calves are weaned at 6–15 months.

== Conservation ==
The finless porpoise is listed on Appendix II of the Convention on the Conservation of Migratory Species of Wild Animals (CMS). It is listed on Appendix II as it has an unfavourable conservation status or would benefit significantly from international co-operation organised by tailored agreements.

Since this species remains in coastal waters, it has a high degree of interaction with humans, which often puts the finless porpoise at risk. Like other porpoises, large numbers of this species are killed by entanglement in gill nets. The primary danger to the species is environmental degradation. Unlike other members of this family, finless porpoises have lived in captivity for over 15 years.

There are no well-established estimates of the animals' abundance. However, a comparison of two surveys, one from the late 1970s and the other from 1999–2000, shows a decline in population and distribution. Scientists believe this decline has been ongoing for decades, and the current population is just a fraction of its historical levels. Along the southern coast of Pakistan in the Arabian Sea it is declared as an endangered species.

The WWF Website states that the finless porpoise is Critically endangered. However, it is not the official 'IUCN Endangered Status'.

== See also ==
- List of endangered and protected species of China
- List of cetaceans
