= Yangtze Freshwater Dolphin Expedition 2006 =

Six-week dolphin expedition

The Yangtze Freshwater Dolphin Expedition 2006 (Chinese: 长江淡水豚类考察) was a six-week search expedition undertaken in November and December 2006 in Central China in an attempt to locate continued proof of the existence of the endangered baiji Yangtze dolphin (Chinese river dolphin). It was carried out under the direction of the Wuhan Institute of Hydrobiology and the Swiss-based baiji.org Foundation and was notable for drawing to an end without any positive results. Thus it was announced that the species was functionally extinct. Freshwater cetaceans are the most endangered species on Earth with them distributed across South America in the Amazon and in China.

The scientists travelled on two research vessels almost 3500 kilometres from Yichang to the nearby Three Gorges Dam, onto Shanghai and into the Yangtze Delta before retracing their path backwards. They used high-performance optical instruments and underwater microphones in an attempt to locate one of the dolphins.

The head of the baiji.org Foundation and co-organizer of the expedition, August Pfluger was reported to have said "It is possible we may have missed one or two animals". However even if a small number were still alive, it is extremely unlikely they would be able to survive in the long-term. "It is a tragedy, a loss not only for China, but for the entire world." Pfluger had said from his base in Wuhan.

Others retain some hope for the species. Wang Limin, director of the World Wildlife Fund Wuhan office said, "The fact that the expedition didn't see any baiji dolphins during this expedition does not necessarily mean that the species is extinct or even 'effectively extinct', because it covered a considerable distance in a relatively short period of time... However, we are extremely concerned. The Yangtze is highly degraded, and we spotted dramatically fewer finless porpoises than we have in the past."

The expedition was led by the Chinese Ministry of Agriculture and brought together experts from international institutes like the Swiss Federal Institute of Aquatic Science and Technology (Eawag), the National Oceanic and Atmospheric Administration (NOAA), the Hubbs-Seaworld Institute from San Diego and the Fisheries Research Agency in Japan.

A report of the expedition was published online in the journal Biology Letters on August 7, 2007, in which the authors wrote: "We are forced to conclude that the baiji is now likely to be extinct, probably due to unsustainable by-catch in local fisheries..."

"Witness to Extinction: How We Failed To Save The Yangtze River Dolphin", an account of the 2006 survey by Samuel Turvey, one of the survey participants, was published by Oxford University Press in autumn 2008. This book investigated the baiji's probable extinction within the wider-scale context of how and why international efforts to conserve the species had failed, and whether conservation recovery programmes for other threatened species were likely to face similar potentially disastrous administrative hurdles.
