= Zhoutian =

Zhoutian or Zhou Tian may refer to:

- Zhoutian (周田 zhōu-tián), a dialect of Yuebei Tuhua, a Chinese language
- Zhoutian (周田镇 zhōu-tián-zhèn), a town in Huilai County, Jieyang, Guangdong, China; see List of township-level divisions of Guangdong
- Zhoutian (周田镇 zhōu-tián-zhèn), a town in Huichang County, Ganzhou, Jiangxi, China; see List of township-level divisions of Jiangxi
- Zhoutian Village, a division of Chengtanjiang, Liuyang, Changsha City, Hunan Province, China

== See also ==
- Tianzhou (disambiguation)
