= Miyajima Public Aquarium =

Coordinates: 34°17′43″N 132°18′55″E

- entrance of the aquarium
- Interactive map of Miyajima Public Aquarium
- Date opened: 1959
- Location: 10-3 Miyajima, Hatsukaichi, Hiroshima Prefecture, Japan
- No. of animals: 13,000
- No. of species: 350
- Memberships: JAZA
- Website: http://www.sunameri.jp/index.html

Miyajima Public Aquarium (宮島水族館, Miyajima Suizokukan) is an aquarium on the island of Itsukushima in Hatsukaichi, Hiroshima, Japan. The aquarium is accredited as a Museum-equivalent facility by the Museum Act from Ministry of Education, Culture, Sports, Science and Technology.

== Overview ==
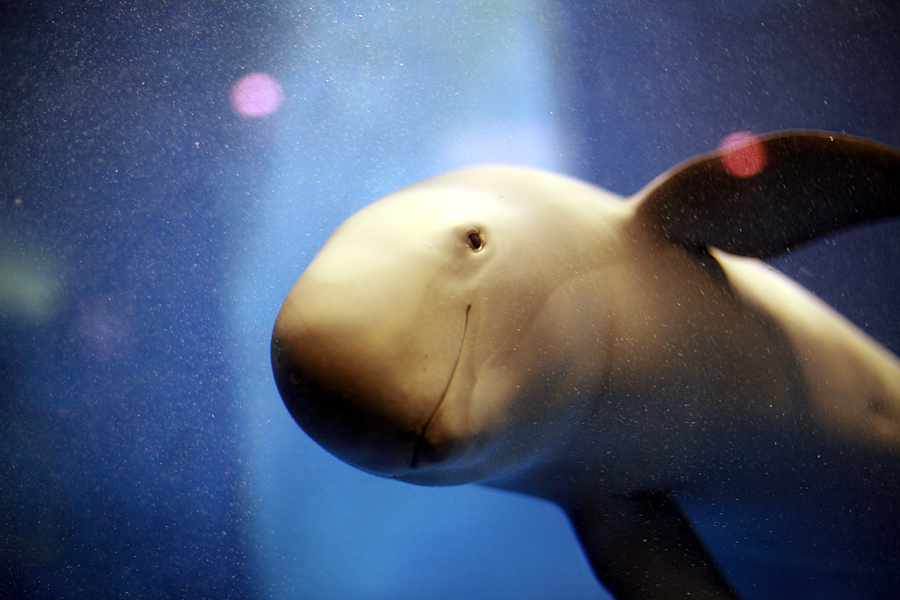
Finless porpoise

The aquarium has around 350 species of aquatic animals include finless porpoises, sea otters, Steller sea lions, sea lions and penguins.

== Exhibits ==
The aquarium is divided into several sections across two floors featuring different habitats:

- Mudflats of Miyajima
- Sea of Healing
- Whales of Setouchi
- Mysteries of the Sea
- Blessings of the Sea
- Rocky Shore of Friendship
- From Mountains to Sea
- Penguin Pool
- Sea Lion Pool

== History ==
Miyajima Public Aquarium opened as a prefectural aquarium in 1959. It was transferred to Miyajima, Hiroshima as a town aquarium in 1967, and its buildings were reconstructed in 1981. In 2005, the aquarium was once again transferred to Hatsukaichi, Hiroshima as a city aquarium. In 2011, a roof was installed near the aquarium entrance as part of building renewal efforts to combat weather concerns.

== See also ==
- Japanese Association of Zoos and Aquariums
- Itsukushima
