= Charles M. Hoy =

Field naturalist

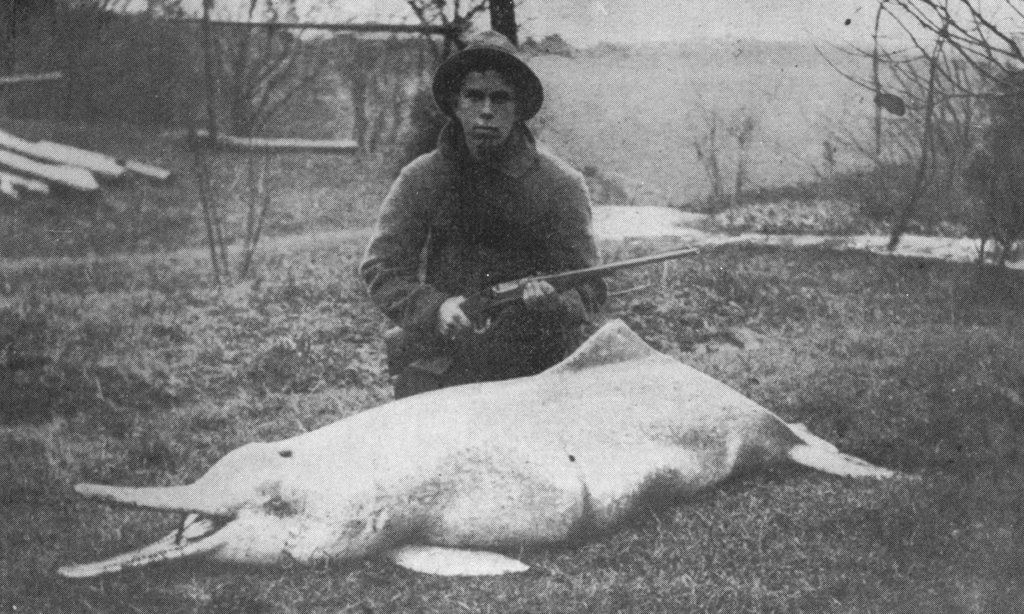
Baiji killed by Charles Hoy in 1914

Charles McCauley Hoy (1897–1923) was a field naturalist who obtained series of mammal and bird specimens for United States National Museum, travelling on expeditions to Australia, China and elsewhere. The large collections of specimens and notes he made in Australia from 1919 to 1922 followed a period of dramatic decline in its mammalian fauna, and have been examined by later workers in efforts to determine the causes of the event. Born in China to foreign missionaries, Hoy returned there in 1922 with a commission from W. L. Abbott to continue collecting specimens for the institution. His successful collecting in that region included becoming the first occidental researcher to obtain a species of rare river dolphin, but his works were curtailed due to an accidentally self-inflicted gunshot injury – and he died there in 1923 from complications following an operation on a gangrenous appendix.

== Biography ==
Charles M. Hoy was the son of Christian missionaries from the United States of America, active in Japan and China.

== Works ==
Hoy was instructed in the techniques of zoological field work during several months at the Smithsonian Institution, and was then directed by W. L. Abbott to undertake a collecting expedition to Australia. He assembled extensive collections and notes on Australian fauna, mostly birds and mammals, obtained at widely separated locations around the continent. The information and material he obtained on his excursions from 1919 to 1922 provides valuable details in the aftermath of what is regarded as extraordinary decline in mammalian fauna in the late nineteenth and early twentieth century.

The season and locations of Hoy's field work have been determined in his excursions to New South Wales during 1919, South Australia from 1919 to early 1920, another journey through the south and north of Western Australia during 1920 and continuing to the Northern Territory later that year. In 1921 he travelled out from Sydney to Tasmania then Queensland and is noted as back at that city in April of the next year, preparing for his return journey to the United States. Charles Hoy's Australian ventures assembled small collections of marine animals and reptile and amphibian species, but the greater part his work was in amassing a collection of around one thousand specimens of birds and a similar number of mammals. The final number of mammalian species totalled around one hundred, collected at fourteen locations around the continent. While in Australia he regularly provided reports to the museum curator Garrett S. Miller and was accompanied by local researchers such as Ellis Le Geyt Troughton. Most of the visits to regions were undertaken by sea voyages, with short excursions to local areas near the ports. When Hoy was in Western Australia, his failure to find species at Perth, previously noted as common around the Swan River settlement by John Gilbert and others, saw him directed to the Busselton and Margaret River area.

After returning to the United States in 1922, Hoy was commissioned by the US national museum to return to China. Prior to his death in China, he became the first occidental researcher to obtain a baiji, the river dolphin Lipotes vexillifer, a rare species that was later declared extinct.

== Legacy ==
The legacy of Charles Hoy's works was recognized in the names of newly described animals by his contemporaries. The results of his field work in Australia were reexamined in the twenty first century to supplement the small amount of contemporary surveys or research undertaken at the time of his expeditions. Charles Hoy is said to have become the first broadly informed worker in the field of Australian fauna, in his own summary of the expedition around the continent he says, "according to the Australian Museum authorities, and others who should know, there is no one in all Australia who is an authority on Australian mammals or even the mammals of one state!". The records and collections Hoy made have recognized limitations, he did not often venture far from camps, visit a variety of habitats in the regions he visited, or necessarily add to series of a species he obtained elsewhere, but it was enhanced by documenting the knowledge of local peoples and in its overview of the continent around 1920.

Hoy was also the author of 'The Present Status of the Australian Mammal Fauna', published in the Journal of Mammalogy in 1923, an important article that was not noticed until a literature review on the same topic at the end of that century. After investigation by an Australian researcher of the material deposited by Charles Hoy at the US Museum of Natural History, the records and interviews in his unpublished papers and letters were revealed and examined. The anecdotal and incidental material in his field notes had been disregarded by earlier researchers, containing little of use to the reductive approach of his contemporaries, but a valuable source of information to the pluralistic methods of the ecologists and others examining the catastrophic decline of Australian mammals. Hoy's informants of population declines included both the colonial and indigenous peoples of the regions he visited, who also assisted in locating or providing specimens of those mammal species which persisted. These papers were published by the Australia's CSIRO as Field notes, correspondence and specimen list of museum collector Charles Hoy.

In his own work, Charles Hoy identified the recent absences and rarity of reportedly common species and proposed explanations to account for the disappearances. The factors he determined were not any deliberate actions of 'man', instead proposing the primary cause was the indirectly introduced and feral animals – rabbits, foxes and cats – and presented this as a greater threat than alterations to fire regimes, land clearing and pastoralism; Hoy placed the least concern on the threat posed by people capturing and killing animals. In his assessment of the population declines of Australia animals, which he had identified in his report, his forecast of their trajectory was pessimistic, "It is only a matter of time before the Australian fauna is extinct and if nothing is done now it will soon be too late."
