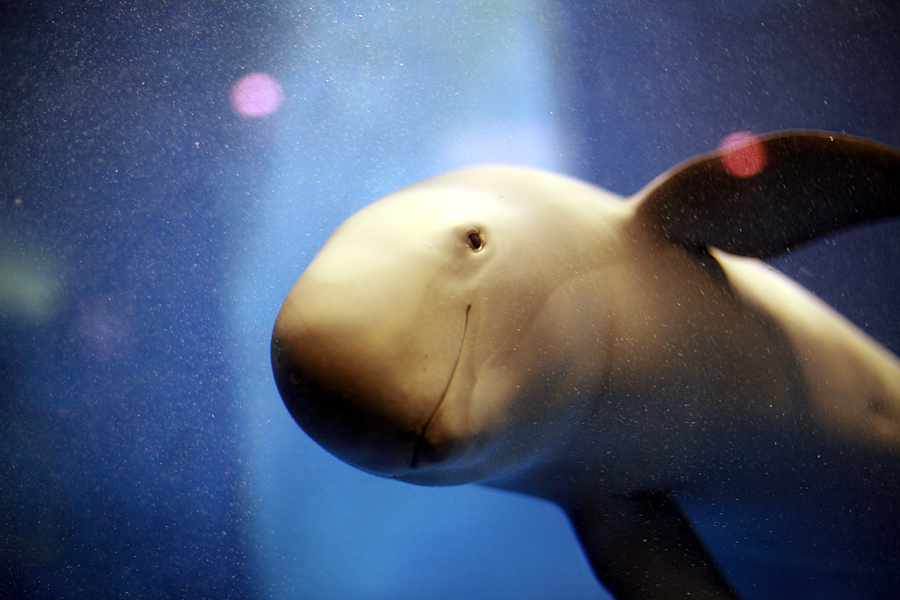
- Neophocaena sunameri at Miyajima Public Aquarium

Scientific classification
- Kingdom: Animalia
- Phylum: Chordata
- Class: Mammalia
- Order: Artiodactyla
- Infraorder: Cetacea
- Family: Phocoenidae
- Genus: Neophocaena; Palmer, 1899

Type species
- Delphinus phocaenoides Cuvier, 1829

Species
- Neophocaena asiaeorientalis Neophocaena phocaenoides Neophocaena sunameri
- For all three finless porpoise species

= Finless porpoise =

Genus of porpoises

Neophocaena is a genus of porpoise native to the Indian and Pacific oceans, as well as the freshwater habitats of the Yangtze River basin in China. They are commonly known as finless porpoises. Genetic studies indicate that Neophocaena is the most basal living member of the porpoise family.

There are three species in this genus:

Image	Scientific name	Common name	Distribution
	Neophocaena asiaeorientalis	Yangtze finless porpoise	Yangtze River basin in China
	Neophocaena phocaenoides	Indo-Pacific finless porpoise	Persian Gulf east to the Taiwan Strait, south to Indonesia
	Neophocaena sunameri	East Asian finless porpoise	Taiwan Strait north to the Yellow Sea, east to the east coast of Japan

== Description ==
The finless porpoises are the only porpoises to lack a true dorsal fin. Instead there is a low ridge covered in thick skin bearing several lines of tiny tubercles. In addition, the forehead is unusually steep compared with those of other porpoises. With fifteen to twenty-one teeth in each jaw, they also have, on average, fewer teeth than other porpoises, although there is some overlap, and this is a not a reliable means of distinguishing them. Finless porpoises in Ariake Sound-Tachibana Bay showed ontogenetic and seasonal variations in diet. The mean length at weaning was estimated to be 101 cm, corresponding to approximately 6 months of age. Calves fed on small-sized demersal fish and cephalopods.
