= Eolipotes =

Eolipotes Temporal range: Late Miocene 11.29–11.25 Ma

Scientific classification
- Kingdom: Animalia
- Phylum: Chordata
- Class: Mammalia
- Order: Artiodactyla
- Infraorder: Cetacea
- Family: Lipotidae
- Genus: †Eolipotes; Kimura & Hasegawa, 2024
- Species: †E. japonicus

Binomial name
- †Eolipotes japonicus Kimura & Hasegawa, 2024

Extinct genus of freshwater dolphins

Eolipotes is an extinct genus of marine river dolphin of the family Lipotidae. It is the oldest known member of the family, having lived in what is now Japan during the Tortonian stage of the Late Miocene. Fossils of this animal are known from the Tochigi prefecture (Ogane or Tanokura Formation) and the Gunma prefecture (Haraichi Formation). Eolipotes was a small cetacean, with the skull indicating a length of around 2.17 m (7 ft 1 in). In spite of its name, Eolipoteshas been found to be more closely related to the genus Parapontoporia, which could indicate that some species of Paraprotoporia and the baiji became freshwater animals independently from one another. However it is also possible that they all evolved from ancestors that already inhabited estuaries, with Eolipotes simply becoming more marine. The genus only includes a single species: E. japonicus.

== History and naming ==
Eolipotes was described in 2024 on the basis of two fossil specimens discovered in the Kanto region of Japan, specifically the prefectures of Gunma and Tochigi. The holotype specimen was discovered in 2012 by Yukinori Hamada and subsequently excavated by the combined efforts of the Kaijo Junior & Senior High School's geology club and the Tochigi Prefectural Museum. The material, which consists of a skull and other assorted fossil material, clearly belonged to at least two individuals given the presence of three tympanic bullae recovered from the site. The second specimen, designated the paratype and consisting of a partial skull, was collected by Hajime Nakajima from outcrops near the Usui River in the Gunma Prefecture, south-west of where the holotype originated. The holotype was found in the Kinugawa River, with the geology of the locality indicating that it stems from either the upper parts of the Ogane Formation or the lower units of the Tanokura Formation, both of which indicate that the material is Tortonian in age. The paratype also dates to the Tortonian, with the specific sediments providing more a more precise age estimate, narrowing the age down to 11.29 – 11.25 million years. However, the paratype stems from the Haraichi Formation, which is part of the Annaka Group.

The name Eolipotes is a simple combination between the Latin word "eo" meaning early and Lipotes, the genus name of the Holocene Baiji or Yangtze river dolphin, drawing attention to the fact that Eolipotes is the oldest precisely dated member of the family Lipotidae. The species name references the fossils country of origin, Japan.

== Description ==
The skull of Eolipotes has been noted for its small size, with the holotype specimen only measuring around 14.4 cm (5.7 in) across the widest point of the skull. The rostrum is not fully preserved in either specimen, making it impossible to say how long the snout would have been, but it does show that it was proportionally narrow, widening the closer it gets to the facial region. The rostrum displays a noticeable construction at its base, corresponding to the endpoint of the alveolar groove, before the skull widens abruptly around the maxillary eminence.

The premaxillae dorch over the dorsal-most surface of the rostrum, initially convex but gradually transitioning to having a concave surface towards the back as they contribute to the central basin, a shallow depression in the skull. The extent of the basin is similar to what is seen in other lipotids, with the depth being most similar to that of Parapontoporia wilsoni. A unique feature of the skull of Eolipotes that differentiates it from other lipotids is that the nasals actually come into context with the nasal bones, which could be a basal trait lost in the other genera of the family. The maxillae form the majority of the rostrum and house the alveolar groove, though the individual dental alveoli are poorly known due to what might be preservation. A deep medial sulcus stretches across the ventral surface of the rostrum, giving the crosssection the shape of an upside-down U. Such a sulcus is especially well developed in longirostrine cetaceans like the related Parapontoporia and eurhinodelphids and may serve to strengthen the rostrum. Around the base of the rostrum, the maxilla forms an elliptical structure interpreted to represent the maxillary eminence, at which point the bones widen significantly as they transition to the facial region. Just behind and next to the eminence there is a small ridge, thought to be the maxillary crest which is better developed and Parapontoporia and Lipotes. The left maxilla features two dorsal infraorbital foramina, the more anterior of which is similar in its location to that in modern baijis. The posterior limits of the maxillae on the underside of the skull might preserve the contact between maxillae and palatines, which in turn informs the limit of the pterygoid sinus fossa. Judging from this, the fossa may have ended at or behind the antorbital notch, making it shorter than that of other lipotids. Towards the back of the skull the maxillae approach each other again and come into contact with the raised frontal bones that forms part of the cranial vertex.

The nasal bones are the second element that contributes to the cranial vertex and are wide towards the front and narrow towards the back, with the frontals extending between the two nasals. The contact between nasals and frontals is difficult to observe on account of these bones having almost fused into a singular element. When viewed from above, the vertex as formed by nasals and frontals is roughly triangular in shape, with the point facing towards the back. The frontal part of the vertex is pinched. While this is similar to what is seen in other lipotids, the same can be seen in some members of Inioidea and certain "kentriodontids".

The periotic bone, specifically the anterior bullar facet, is distinct in lipotids and serves to differentiate them from other dolphin groups. The anterodorsal part of the anterior process is especially noteworthy in Eolipotes, as it clearly sets it apart from Lipotes and Paraprotoporia. Whereas in Lipotes this region is rounded and in Paraprotoporia its notably less developed, the anterodorsal aspect of the anterior process is distinctly angled, which gives this element a rectangular appearance in profile view. The process further lacks the prominent ridges that are seen in the periotic of the baiji.

50 teeth have been found around the holotype skull of Eolipotes, yet have not been assigned to the holotype. Regardless, these teeth are small and slender, with the tips curving back.

=== Size ===
Since the bizygomatic width of the skull is not known, Kimura and Hasegawa calculated the body length of Eolipotes based on the width across the postorbitals, reasoning that the values are generally similar in delphinids. Their results indicate that Eolipotes may have grown to a length of 2.17 m (7 ft 1 in).

== Phylogeny ==
The type description conducted a phylogenetic analysis based on the supermatrix established by the authors in 2019, itself based on prior supermatrices by Lambert et al. (2017) and Peredo et al. (2018). The two specimens were combined into a single operational taxonomic unit representative of the species for the analysis rather than being scored individually. Finally the analysis was conducted both with equally weighting and implied weighting, tho the trees of both results are much the same and conform with prior results.

The results differ primarily in the relationship between Lipotids and other dolphin groups, with equal weighting placing them as the sister group to Inioidea (South American river dolphins) and Delphinoidea (dolphins and porpoises) while implied weighting suggests them to form a monophyletic clade with inioids as well as some select "kentriodontids". Regardless of the relation between lipotids and other dolphins as a whole, both methods agree in the fact that Lipotidae is restricted to Lipotes, Eolipotes and Parapontoporia, with the latter two emerging as each other's closest relatives.

- Delphinida
  - Delphinodon†
  - - - Rudicetus†
      - Kentriodon†
    - - - Wimahl†
        - Kampholophus†
      - - - Macrokentriodon†
          - Hadrodelphis†
        - - - Liolithax†
            - - Lophocetus calvertensis†
              - - Pithanodelphis†
                - - Lophocetus repenningi†
                  - Lipotidae
                    - Lipotes
                    - - Parapontoporia†
                      - Eolipotes†
          - - Tagicetus†
            - - Inioidea
              - Delphinoidea
                - Phocoenidae
                - Delphinidae

- Delphinida
  - - Rudicetus†
    - Delphinodon†
  - - - Kentriodon obscurus†
      - - - Kentriodon schneideri†
          - - Kentriodon nakajimai†
            - Kentriodon pernix†
        - - Kentriodon diusinus†
          - - Lophocetus calvertensis†
            - - Wimahl†
              - Kampholophus†
    - - - - - Tagicetus†
            - Pithanodelphis†
          - Lipodidae
            - Lipotes
            - - Parapontoporia†
              - Eolipotes†
        - Inioidea
      - Delphinoidea
        - Phocoenidae (including Monodontidae)
        - Delphinidae

== Evolutionary significance ==
Though once thought to represent a single group, modern research has shown that the four Holocene river dolphin groups; Lipotidae, Iniidae, Platanistidae and Pontoporiidae; all represent independent instances of once marine forms invading freshwater habitats.

All three known lipotids show a different degree of affinity for freshwater, serving to show how members of a group could adapt to such vastly different environments. Eolipotes appears to have been the most marine taxon, whereas the baiji is only known from freshwater. Parapontoporia represents a mix of the two. While it was originally thought to be exclusively marine, more recent excavations have recovered Parapontoporia fossils from non-marine environments, leading to the idea that at least some may have been facultative or obligate freshwater animals. The significance of this becomes clear when considering the phylogeny, linking Eolipotes with Parapontoporia. Assuming that their ancestors were marine, this would mean that Eolipotes maintained their ancestral lifestyle whereas Lipotes and Parapontoporia represent two independent freshwater invasions within the same family. However Kimura and Hasegawa highlight how this interpretation is not set in stone, as it is also possible that ancestral lipotids could have already been inhabitants of river deltas as is seen in some modern dolphin populations. Should this be the case, the freshwater occurrences of some lipotids might just represent various degrees of additional specialisation rather than fully independent invasions into freshwater.
