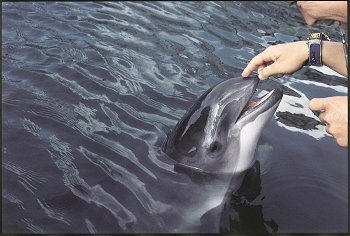
- Harbour Porpoise (Phocoena phocoena)

Scientific classification
- Kingdom: Animalia
- Phylum: Chordata
- Class: Mammalia
- Infraclass: Placentalia
- Order: Artiodactyla
- Infraorder: Cetacea
- Parvorder: Odontoceti
- Clade: Delphinida
- Superfamily: Delphinoidea; Flower, 1865

Families
- See text

= Delphinoidea =

Delphinoidea Temporal range: 28–0 Ma Oligocene to Recent

Superfamily of mammals

Delphinoidea are the largest group of toothed whales, including 66 genera in 6 families. The largest living member of the superfamily is the orca, which can reach 6 tons, while the smallest is the vaquita.

== Taxonomy ==
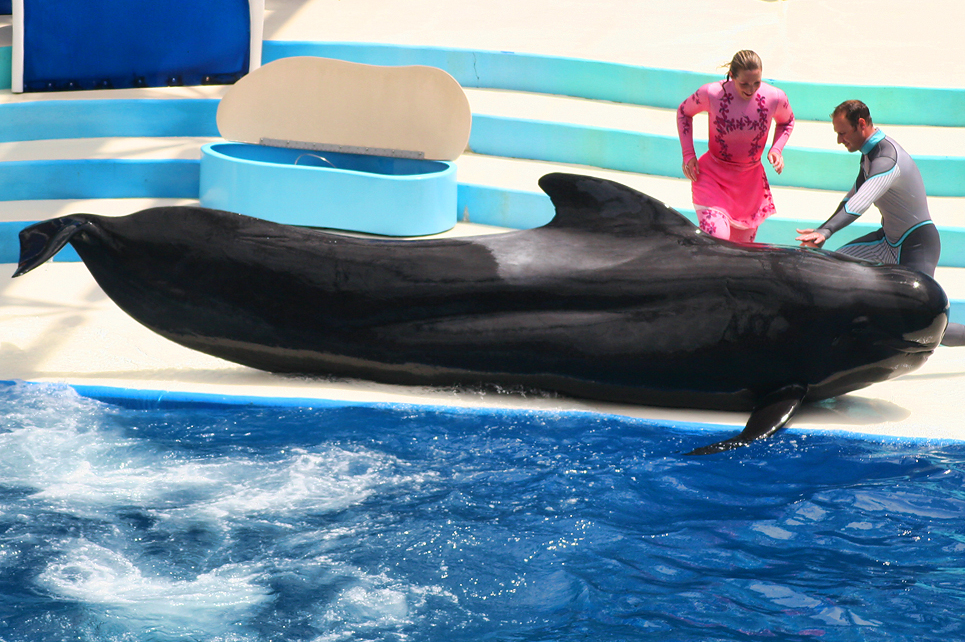
Short-finned Pilot Whale (Globicephala macrorhynchus)

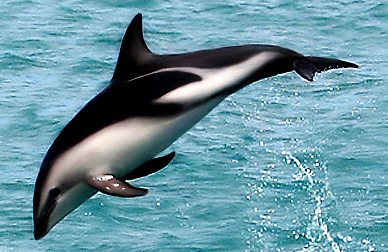
Dusky dolphin (Aethalodelphis obscurus)

Delphinoidea is a very diverse clade. It includes all extant oceanic dolphins, as well as various extinct species, like the unique Odobenocetops. The three extant families within Delphinoidea are Delphinidae (oceanic dolphins), Monodontidae (beluga and narwhal) and Phocoenidae (porpoises).

Based on McGowen et al., 2019

Superfamily Delphinoidea

Family †Albireonidae

Genus Albireo

Family Delphinidae

Subfamily Delphininae

Genus Delphinus
Genus Lagenodelphis
Genus Sotalia
Genus Sousa
Genus Stenella
Genus Tursiops

Subfamily Globicephalinae

Genus †Astadelphis
Genus Feresa
Genus Globicephala
Genus Grampus
Genus Orcaella
Genus Peponocephala
Genus Pseudorca
Genus Steno

Subfamily Lissodelphininae

Genus Aethalodelphis
Genus Cephalorhynchus
Genus Lissodelphis

Subfamily Orcininae

Genus †Arimidelphis
Genus †Eodelphinus
Genus †Hemisyntrachelus
Genus Orcinus

Subfamily incertae sedis

Genus †Australodelphis
Genus †Etruridelphis
Genus Lagenorhynchus
Genus Leucopleurus
Genus †Sinanodelphis

Family †Kentriodontidae

Subfamily Kentriodontinae

Genus Belonodelphis
Genus Delphinodon
Genus Heterodelphis
Genus Incacetus?
Genus Kentriodon
Genus Lamprolithax
Genus Loxolithax
Genus Macrokentriodon
Genus Microphocaena
Genus Rudicetus
Genus Tagicetus

Subfamily Lophocetinae

Genus Hadrodelphis
Genus Liolithax
Genus Lophocetus
Genus Platyvercus

Subfamily Pithanodelphininae?

Genus Atocetus?
Genus Leptodelphis?
Genus Pithanodelphis?
Genus Sarmatodelphis?
Genus Sophianacetus?

Subfamily Kampholophinae?

Genus Kampholophos?

Family Monodontidae

Subfamily Delphinapterinae

Genus †Bohaskaia
Genus Delphinapterus
Genus † Denebola

Subfamily Monodontinae

Genus Monodon

Family † Odobenocetopsidae

Genus Odobenocetops

Family Phocoenidae

Genus †Archaeophocaena
Genus †Australithax
Genus †Brabocetus
Genus †Haborophocoena
Genus †Lomacetus
Genus †Miophocaena
Genus Neophocaena
Genus †Numataphocoena
Genus Phocoena
Genus Phocoenoides
Genus †Piscolithax
Genus †Pterophocaena
Genus †Salumiphocaena
Genus †Semirostrum
Genus †Septemtriocetus

Familia incertae sedis

Genus †Graamocetus
Genus †Miodelphis
Genus †Nannolithax
Genus †Oedolithax
Genus †Palaeophocaena
Genus †Platylithax
Genus †Protodelphinus
