= Miminiacetus =

Miminiacetus Temporal range: Middle Miocene, 15–13 Ma

Scientific classification
- Kingdom: Animalia
- Phylum: Chordata
- Class: Mammalia
- Infraclass: Placentalia
- Order: Artiodactyla
- Infraorder: Cetacea
- Clade: Delphinida
- Genus: †Miminiacetus; Godfrey and Lambert, 2023

Type species
- †Lophocetus pappus Kellogg, 1955

Other species
- M. pappus (Kellogg, 1955); M. barrancai Lambert et al., 2026

Extinct genus of dolphins

Miminiacetus ("Inia mimic") is an extinct genus of dolphin belonging to the clade Delphinida that is known from late Miocene (Tortonian) marine deposits in the eastern US and Peru. Although usually placed in Kentriodontidae, recent studies have found it only distantly related to Kentriodon.

== Taxonomy and phylogeny ==
Two species of Miminiacetus are known, M. pappus and M. barrancai.

The phylogenetic analysis of Brujadelphis recovered Miminiacetus pappus as the sister taxon of Lipotidae. If Miminiacetus is a relative of the baiji, it would fill a gap in the early evolutionary history of the baiji because the oldest unambiguous extinct relative of the baiji, Parapontoporia, hails from younger marine deposits. However, a strict consensus phylogenetic analysis of the pontoporiid Scaldiporia recovers the genus outside the clade formed by Inioidea+Lipotidae and Delphinoidea.

== Discovery ==
In 1955, Remington Kellogg described a new species of Lophocetus, L. pappus, on the basis of the skull USNM 15985 from the Langhian-age Plum Point Member of the Calvert Formation. In 1978, however, Lawrence Barnes of the Los Angeles Museum of Natural History referred this species to the similarly Langhian-age genus Liolithax based on similarities in the earbone morphology, as Liolithax pappus. The assignment of Lophocetus pappus to Liolithax by Barnes (1978) was followed by several authors, including Ichishima et al. (1995), Dawson (1996), and Uhen et al. (2008), although Whitmore and Kaltenbach (2008) did not. However, in a couple of abstracts published in 2000 and 2008, Barnes and colleagues recognized Lophocetus pappus as a new genus of lophocetine distinct from Liolithax after the discovery of a skull from Middle Miocene marine deposits in Baja California Sur showed that Liolithax was a kentriodontine rather than a lophocetine and different from L. pappus in its smaller tooth diameter, smaller size, and more elongated rostrum. Godfrey and Lambert (2023) confirmed the generic distinctness of "L." pappus from Liolithax and erected the new genus Miminiacetus for it.
