= Pisco Formation =

Geologic formation in Peru

- Stratigraphic range: Late Miocene-Early Pliocene (Tortonian-Zanclean); ~9.6–4.5 Ma
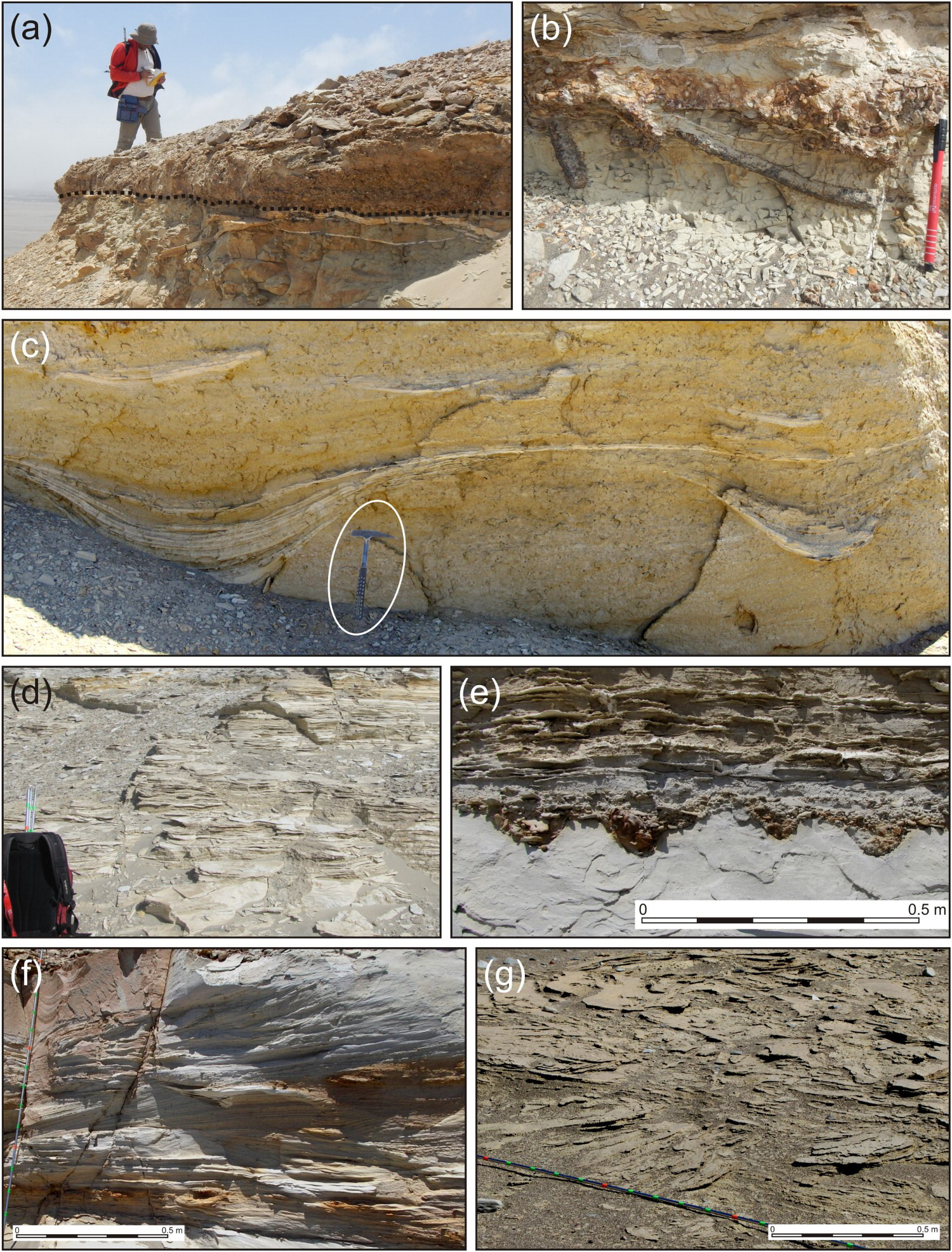
- Lithology and sediments of the Pisco Formation across its allomembers
- Type: Geological formation
- Unit of: Pisco Basin
- Overlies: Chilcatay & Caballas Formations
- Thickness: 640 m (2,100 ft)

Lithology
- Primary: Tuffaceous sandstone, diatomaceous siltstone
- Other: Conglomerate, dolomite

Location
- Coordinates: 15.7°S 74.5°W
- Approximate paleocoordinates: 15.8°S 73.8°W
- Region: Arequipa & Ica Regions
- Country: Peru
- Extent: From Pisco to Yauca

Type section
- Named for: Pisco
- Outcrops of the formation in Peru

The Pisco Formation is a geologic formation located in Peru, on the southern coastal desert of Ica and Arequipa. The approximately 640 metres (2,100 ft) thick formation was deposited in the Pisco Basin, spanning an age from the Late Miocene up to the Early Pliocene, roughly from 9.6 to 4.5 Ma. The tuffaceous sandstones, diatomaceous siltstones, conglomerates and dolomites were deposited in a lagoonal to near-shore environment, in bays similar to other Pacific South American formations as the Bahía Inglesa and Coquimbo Formations of Chile.

The Pisco Formation is considered one of the most important Lagerstätten sites, based on the large amount of exceptionally preserved marine fossils, including sharks (most notably megalodon), birds including penguins, whales and dolphins, marine crocodiles, and Thalassocnus, a marine giant sloths.

Other famous fossils from this site include the giant raptorial sperm whale Livyatan, the sperm whale relative Acrophyseter, and the walrus-like dolphin Odobenocetops.

== Description ==
The Pisco Formation of the Pisco Basin consists of tuffaceous sandstones, diatomaceous yellow to gray siltstones and a basal conglomerate. The formation is deposited from Pisco in the north to Yauca in the south. The northern portion is known as the Ocucaje Area and the southern part as the Sacaco Area. The total thickness of the formation is estimated at 640 metres (2,100 ft). The formation unconformably overlies the Chilcatay and Caballas Formations.

== Paleobiota of the Pisco Formation ==
The Pisco Formation has provided a rich resource of marine fauna, including marine mammals like cetaceans and seals, large fishes, reptiles, and penguins. It is also one of the richest sites in the world for fossil cetaceans, with close to 500 examples being found in the formation.

The oldest fossils of the aquatic sloth Thalassocnus (T. antiquus) come from the Aguada de Lomas horizon of the Pisco Formation and were dated at roughly 7 Ma. The youngest specimen (T. carolomartini) was found in the Sacaco horizon and dated to approximately 3 Ma. Thalassocnus was preyed upon by the probable apex predators of the environment, Livyatan and megalodon. The youngest strata belonging to the formation have been dated at 2 Ma, corresponding to the Early Pleistocene (Uquian). Fossils of the modern Humboldt penguin were found in these deposits at the Yauca locality.

Color key
Taxon	Reclassified taxon	Taxon falsely reported as present	Dubious taxon or junior synonym	Ichnotaxon	Ootaxon	Morphotaxon

Notes
Uncertain or tentative taxa are in small text; ~~crossed out~~ taxa are discredited.

=== Mollusks ===
==== Bivalves ====
Taxa	Species	Description	Images	Notes
Dosinia	indet. sp.			

==== Polychaetes ====
Taxa	Species	Description	Images	Notes
Diplochaetetes	D. mexicanus	A cirratulid bristle worm		

==== Gastropods ====
Taxa	Species	Description	Images	Notes
Acanthina	A. obesa			
Acanthina	A. triangularis			
Concholepas	C. kieneri			
Herminespina	indet. sp.			

=== Fish ===
==== Bony fish ====
Taxa	Species	Description	Images	Notes
Alosinae	indet. sp.	A type of herring		
Centropomidae	C. aff. Psamoperca	A snook		
Triglidae	indet. sp.	A type of sea robin		
Xiphiidae	indet. sp.	A swordfish		
Sardinops	S. humboldti	A sardine		

==== Rays ====
Taxa	Species	Description	Images	Notes
Myliobatis	indet. sp.	A species of eagle ray		

==== Sharks ====
Taxa	Species	Locality	Materials	Description	Images	Notes
Carcharias	C. taurus			Archaic sand tiger shark		
Carcharhinus	indet. sp.			A requiem shark		
Carcharodon	C. carcharias			Archaic great white shark and close relative, respectively		
Carcharodon	C. hubbelli		Jaw, multiple teeth, and 45 vertebral centra	Archaic great white shark and close relative, respectively		
Carcharodon	C. hastalis		Fossilized jaws.	The broad-toothed "mako"		
Carcharodon	C. plicatilis			The broad-toothed "mako"		
Hexanchus	H. gigas			A cow shark		
Isurus	I. oxyrhinchus			Archaic shortfin mako		
Otodus	O. megalodon	Sub-Sacaco, Cerro Colorado, Aguada de Lomas, and El Jahuay	Multiple teeth, vertebrae, and dentition	The largest of the megatoothed sharks (Otodontidae) and of all fishes		

=== Reptiles ===
==== Crocodilians ====
Taxa	Species	Locality	Materials	Description	Images	Notes
Eusuchia	indet. sp.					
Piscogavialis	P. jugaliperforatus	Sacaco	A partial skeleton and a skull.	A gryposuchine (gharial relative)		
Piscogavialis	P. laberintoensis	Laberinto area, Ladera de Lisson Hill	A complete skull and mandible, along with postcranial elements	A gryposuchine (gharial relative)		
Sacacosuchus	S. cordovai	Sacaco	A nearly complete skull	A gharial relative (Gavialidae)		

==== Turtles ====
Taxa	Species	Locality	Materials	Description	Images	Notes
Pacifichelys	P. urbinai			A sea turtle (Cheloniidae)		
Chelonia	indet. sp.			Green sea turtle relative		

=== Birds ===
Taxa	Species	Locality	Materials	Description	Images	Notes
Ciconiidae indet.	Gen. et sp. indet.			A stork		
Fulmarus	Indet. sp.			A petrel		
Morus	M. peruvianus	Sud-Sacaco	A set of limb elements	A relative of living gannets (Sulidae)		
Perugyps	P. diazi	Sud-Sacaco	A limb element (right carpometacarpus).	A New World vulture (Cathartidae)		
Pelagornis	P. sp.	Aguada de Lomas	Proximal carpometacarpus and right humerus ends	A pseudotoothed bird (Pelagornithidae)		
Pelecanus	Indet. sp.			A pelican		
Phalacrocorax	P. aff. bougainvillii			A relative of the Guanay cormorant		
Phalacrocorax	cf. Phalacrocorax sp.			Probable cormorant remains		
Rhamphastosula	R. aguierrei	Sud-Sacaco West	A cranium skull	A sulid bird with an enlarged beak		
Rhamphastosula	R. ramirezi	Sud-Sacaco West	A skull	A sulid bird with an enlarged beak		
Spheniscus	S. humbodti	Sud Sacaco		Archaic Humboldt penguin		
Spheniscus	S. megarhampus	Sud Sacaco	A partial skeleton	Large-beaked banded penguin		
Spheniscus	S. muizoni	Cerro la Bruja	A partial skeleton.	The oldest banded penguin		
Spheniscus	S. urbinai	Sud-Sacaco West	A partial skeleton (partial skeleton with skull)	A larger banded penguin than S. muizoni		
Sula	S. brandi	Cerro Colorado	A neurocranium lacking interorbital septum, lacrimals, palatines, pterygoids, jugals, quadrates, and right quadratojugal.Proximal portion of the beak, including most of the right dentary and angular.	Relatives of living boobies (Sulidae)		
Sula	S. figueroae	Cerro Colorado	A skull and partial skeleton.	Relatives of living boobies (Sulidae)		
Sula	S. magna	Sud Sacaco	A set of limb elements.	Relatives of living boobies (Sulidae)		
Sula	S. sulita	Sud Sacaco	A limb element (coracoid)	Relatives of living boobies (Sulidae)		

=== Mammals ===
==== Cetaceans ====
Taxa	Species	Locality	Material	Description	Images	Notes
Acrophyseter	A. deinodon	Sud-Sacaco	A skull	A small raptorial physeteroid (sperm whale relative)		
Acrophyseter	A. robustus	Cerro la Bruja	A skull	A small raptorial physeteroid (sperm whale relative)		
Atocetus	A. iquensis	Cero la Bruja	A skull	A small kentriodontid dolphin		
Australithax	A. intermedia	El Jahuay		A long-snouted porpoise (Phocoenidae)		
Balaenoptera	B. siberi	Aguada de Lomas	A partial skeleton	Archaic rorqual (Balaenopteridae)		
Belonodelphis	B. peruanus	Cerro la Bruja	A skull	A kentriodontid dolphin		
Brachydelphis	B. jahuayensis	El Jahuay	A partial skull	A pontoporiid dolphin		
Brachydelphis	B. mazeasi	El Jahuay	A partial skull	A pontoporiid dolphin		
Brujadelphis	B. ankylorostris	Cerro la Bruja	A skull with complete jaw	A toothed whale of uncertain relation (incertae sedis)		
Hemisyntrachelus	H. oligodon	Sud-Sacaco	A skull	An orca relative		
Incakujira	I. anillodefuego	Aguada de Lomas	A preserved skeleton	A small rorqual (Balaenopteridae)		
Incakujira	I. fordycei	Aguada de Lomas	A preserved skeleton	A small rorqual (Balaenopteridae)		
Kogia	K. danomurai	Sacaco	A partial skull consisting of partial cranium, preserving the facial and dorsolateral regions of the cranial vault, but lacking most of the rostrum and basicranium	Basal member of Kogia, the genus of pygmy and dwarf sperm whale		
Koristocetus	K. pescei	Aguada de Lomas	A partial skull	A small kogiid		
Livyatan	L. melvillei	Cerro Colorado	A partially preserved skull with teeth and lower jaw	A very large raptorial physeteroid with 36 centimetres (1.18 ft) teeth		
Lomacetus	L. ginsburgi	Aguada de Lomas		A porpoise relative (Phocoenidae)		
Mamaziphius	M. reyesi	Cerros la Mama y la Hija	A partial skull consisting of partial cranium lacking most of the rostrum, the zygomatic processes of the squamosal, the occipital condyles and the ear bones	An early beaked whale (Ziphiidae)		
Messapicetus	M. gregarius	Cerro Colorado	A partial skeleton consists of a skull, mandibles, humeri, vertebrae, and scapula	An early beaked whale (Ziphiidae)		
Mesokentriodon	M. protohumboldti	Santa rosa	A sub-complete cranium, which lacks part of the right orbit, part of the basicranium, the ear bones, and teeth	A kentriodontid dolphin		
Miminiacetus	M. barrancai	Aguada de Lomas	A completed jaw and teeth	A delphinidan		
Miocaperea	M. pulchra	Aguada de Lomas	A partial skull	A cetothere whale		
Ninoziphius	N. platyrostris	Sacaco	A partial skeleton	A giant beaked whale-relative		
Odobenocetops	O. leptodon	Sacaco	A preserved skull	A tusked odontocete belonging to its unique family		
Odobenocetops	O. peruvianus	Sacaco	A partial skull	A tusked odontocete belonging to its unique family		
Piscobalaena	P. nana	Sud-Sacaco	A skull	A small cetothere		
Piscocetus	P. sacaco	Sacaco	A partial skeleton	An extinct cetacean		
Piscolithax	P. aenigmaticus	Aguada de Lomas	A partial skeleton	A porpoise relative (Phocoenidae)		
Platyscaphokogia	P. landinii	Cerro Hueco la Zorra,	An incomplete skull lacking the tip of the rostrum and the basicranium.	An early beaked whale (Ziphiidae)		
Pliopontos	P. littoralis	Sud-Sacaco	A partial skull	A pontoporiid dolphin		
Scaphokogia	S. cochlearis	Aguada de Lomas	A partial skull	An extinct kogiid		
Scaphokogia	S. huachafo	Aguada de Lomas	A partial skull	An extinct kogiid		

==== Pinnipeds ====
Taxa	Species	Locality	Material	Description	Images	Notes
Acrophoca	A. longirostirus	Sub-Sacaco	A partial skull.	Archaic southern seal (Monachinae)		
Australophoca	A. changorum	Aguada de Lomas	A partial skeleton consists of incomplete right ulna, right radius, right and left humeri, and other unidentified remains.	A phocidae seal.		
Hadrokirus	H. martini	Sub-Sacaco	A partial skull	Archaic southern seal (Monachinae)		
Hydrarctos	H. lomasiensis	Sub-Sacaco	A skull.	A sea lion and fur seal relative (Otariidae)		
Icaphoca	I. choristodon	Cerro La Bruja	A subcomplete skull with associated left and right mandibles, atlas, axis, third, fourth, and fifth cervical vertebrae.	Archaic southern seal (Monachinae)		
Magophoca	M. brevirostris	Cerro la Bruja	A partial skeleton of a male.	Archaic southern seal (Monachinae)		
Piscophoca	P. pacifica	Sub-Sacaco	A partial skull	Archaic southern seal (Monachinae)		

==== Xenarthrans ====
Sloths

Taxa	Species	Locality	Materials	Description	Images	Notes
Thalassocnus	T. antiquus	Aguada de Lomas	A partial skeleton including the skull, mandible, and most of the postcranial skeleton.	a semi-aquatic giant sloth inhabiting marine environments		
Thalassocnus	T. carolomartini	Sacaco	An associated skull and mandible and two articulated hands, probably belonging to the same individual.	a semi-aquatic giant sloth inhabiting marine environments		
Thalassocnus	T. littoralis	Sud-Sacaco	A skull with missing jugals.	a semi-aquatic giant sloth inhabiting marine environments		
Thalassocnus	T. natans	Sud-Sacaco	A skull, mandible, and partial skeleton.	a semi-aquatic giant sloth inhabiting marine environments		

== Correlations ==
=== Laventan ===
Laventan correlations in South America
Formation	Honda	Honda	Aisol	Cura-Mallín	Pisco	Ipururo	Pebas	Capadare	Urumaco	Inés	Paraná	Map
Basin	VSM	Honda	San Rafael	Caldera	Pisco	Ucayali	Amazon	Falcón		Venezuela	Paraná	Pisco Formation (South America)
Country	Colombia	Bolivia	Argentina	Chile	Peru			Venezuela			Argentina	Pisco Formation (South America)
Boreostemma												Pisco Formation (South America)
Hapalops												Pisco Formation (South America)
Miocochilius												Pisco Formation (South America)
Theosodon												Pisco Formation (South America)
Xenastrapotherium												Pisco Formation (South America)
Mylodontidae												Pisco Formation (South America)
Sparassodonta												Pisco Formation (South America)
Primates												Pisco Formation (South America)
Rodents												Pisco Formation (South America)
Birds												Pisco Formation (South America)
Terror birds												Pisco Formation (South America)
Reptiles												Pisco Formation (South America)
megalodon												Pisco Formation (South America)
Flora												Pisco Formation (South America)
Insects												Pisco Formation (South America)
Environments	Fluvial			Fluvio-deltaic		Fluvio-lacustrine		Fluvio-deltaic			Fluvial	Laventan volcanoclastics Laventan fauna Laventan flora
Volcanic	Yes											Laventan volcanoclastics Laventan fauna Laventan flora

== See also ==
- Bahía Inglesa Formation, contemporaneous fossiliferous formation of Chile
- Castilletes Formation, contemporaneous fossiliferous formation of the Cocinetas Basin, Colombia
- Cerro Ballena, contemporaneous fossil site of the Bahía Inglesa Formation of Chile
- Coquimbo Formation, contemporaneous fossiliferous formation of Chile
- Collón Curá Formation, contemporaneous fossiliferous formation of Patagonia, Argentina
- Honda Group, contemporaneous fossiliferous formation of Colombia
- Navidad Formation, contemporaneous fossiliferous formation of Chile
- Pebas Formation, contemporaneous fossiliferous formation of the Amazon Basin
- Urumaco, contemporaneous fossil site of the Falcón Basin, Venezuela
