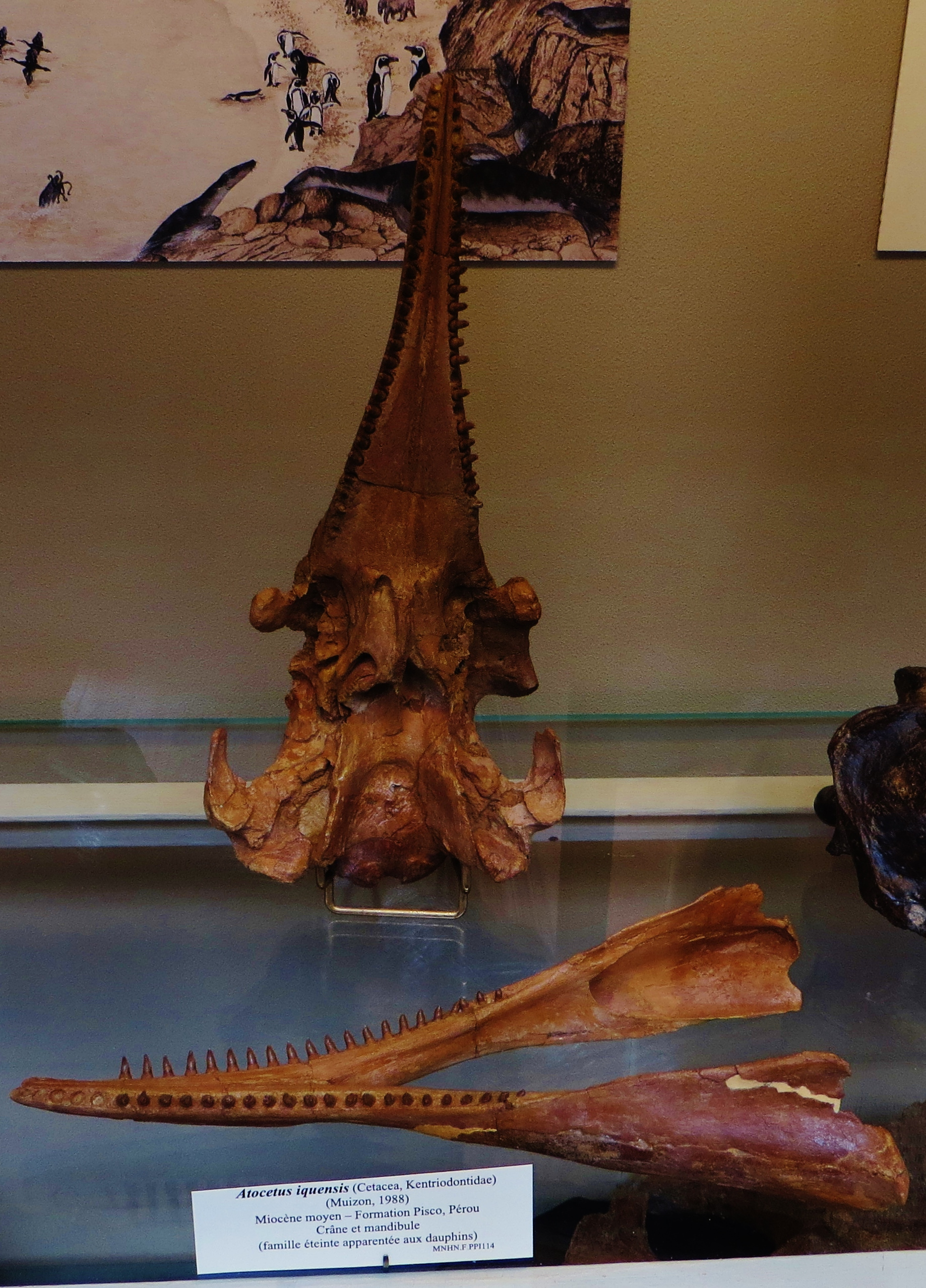
- Skull of A. iquensis at the Gallery of Paleontology and Comparative Anatomy, Paris.

Scientific classification
- Kingdom: Animalia
- Phylum: Chordata
- Class: Mammalia
- Order: Artiodactyla
- Suborder: Whippomorpha
- Infraorder: Cetacea
- Family: †Kentriodontidae
- Subfamily: †Pithanodelphininae
- Genus: †Atocetus; De Muizon 1988

Species
- A. iquensis De Muizon 1988 (type); A. nasalis (Barnes 1985)

= Atocetus =

Atocetus Temporal range: Mid-Late Miocene ~13–7 Ma

Extinct genus of mammals

Atocetus is an extinct genus of pontoporiid dolphin found in Miocene-age marine deposits in Peru and California.

== Description ==
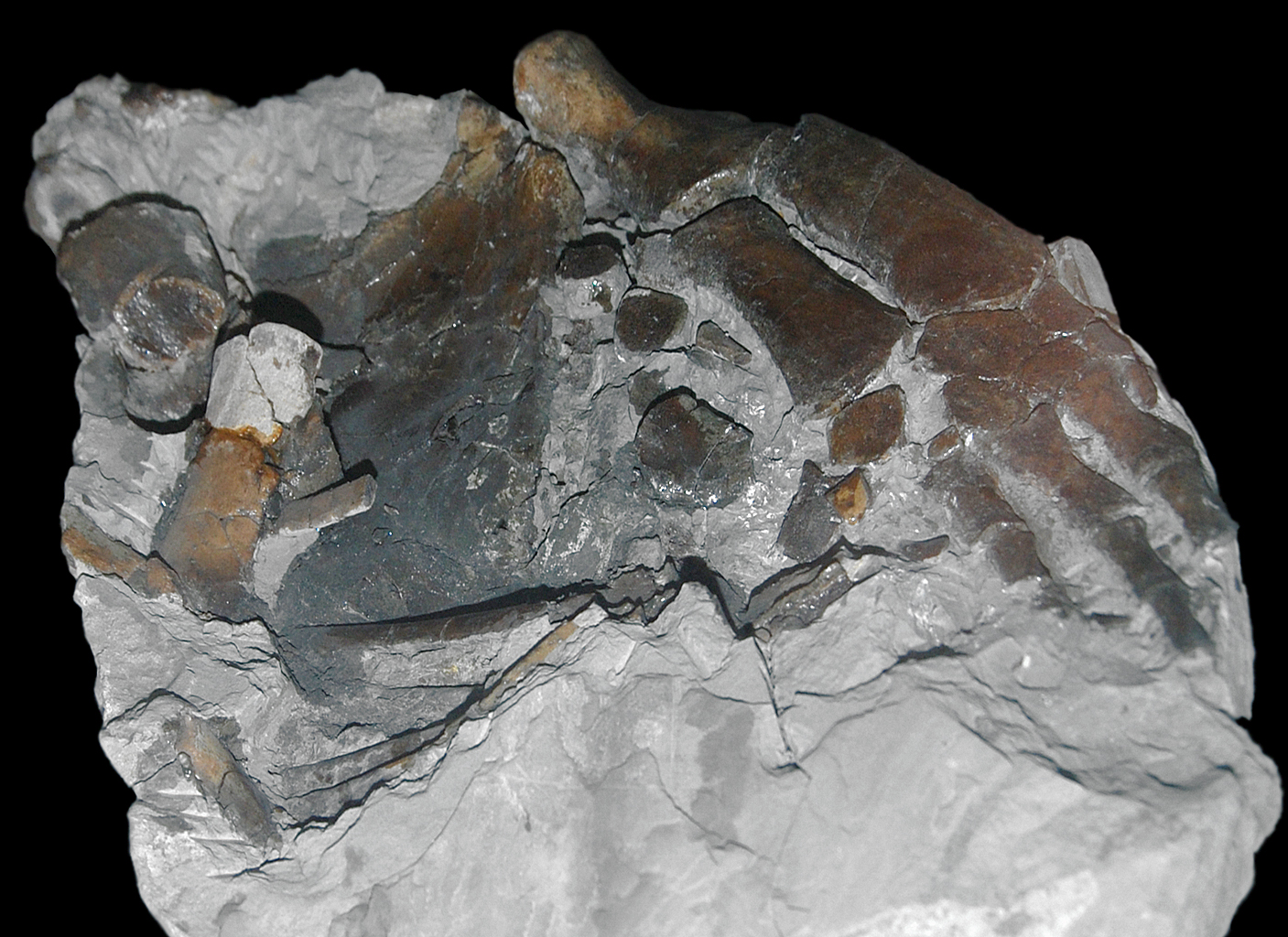
Fossil flipper

The type species, Atocetus iquensis, is known from Serravallian-age strata of the Pisco Formation of Peru, while A. nasalis is known from Tortonian-age marine deposits of the Modelo Formation in California. Barnes (1985) originally described the latter as a species of Pithanodelphis, but it was eventually transferred to Atocetus by Muizon (1988). The Miocene delphinidan "Champsodelphis" fuchsii from marine deposits in Austria was initially tentatively referred to Atocetus based on the discovery of partial skeletons from the Carpathian region with earbones similar to those of Atocetus but was eventually reassigned to Kentriodon following the discovery of additional earbones from Austria and Romania.

== Phylogeny ==
Although Atocetus and other pithanodelphinines are usually assigned to Kentriodontidae, the cladistic analysis of Lambert et al. (2017) showed that Atocetus and Pithanodelphis form a clade with Tagicetus and Lophocetus that is not only phylogenetically more derived than other kentriodontids but is also phylogenetically intermediate between the baiji and members of Inioidea and Phocoenidae. However, a subsequent cladistic analysis by Post et al. (2017) recovers Atocetus as a member of Pontoporiidae, which includes the franciscana.
