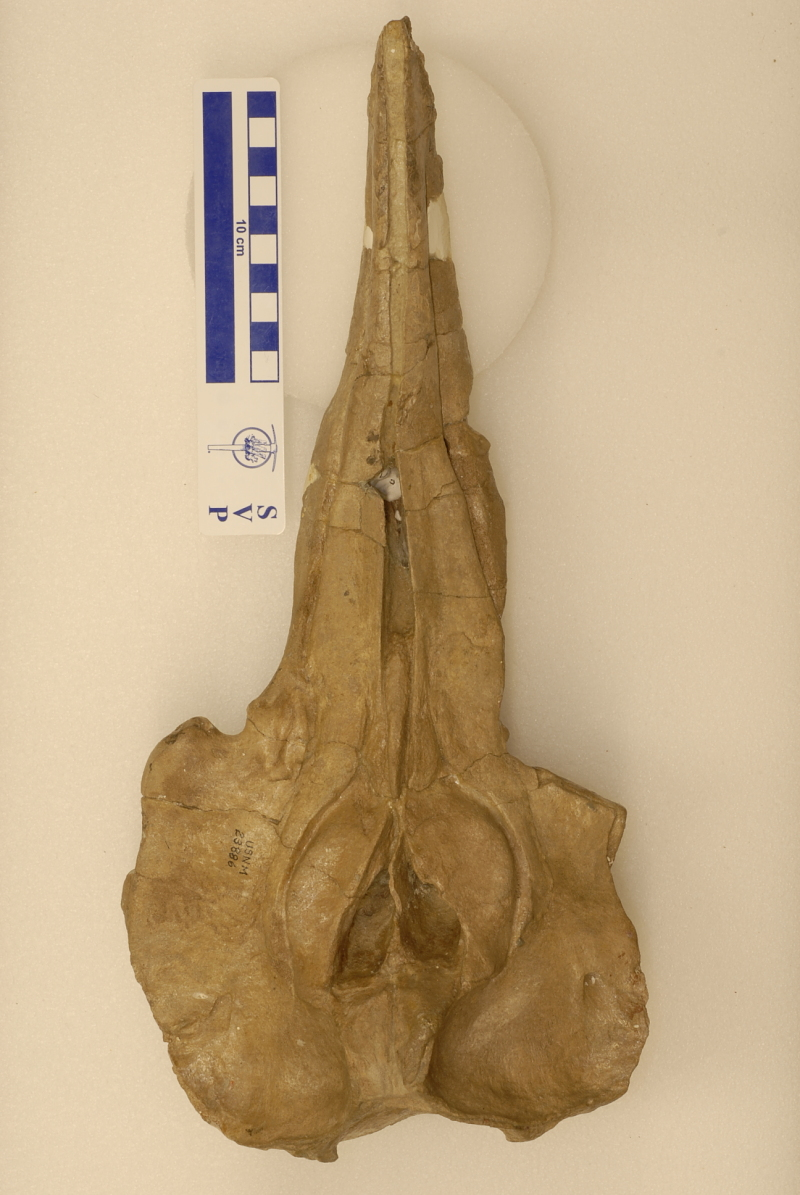
- Lophocetus sp skull

Scientific classification
- Kingdom: Animalia
- Phylum: Chordata
- Class: Mammalia
- Order: Artiodactyla
- Infraorder: Cetacea
- Family: †Kentriodontidae
- Genus: †Lophocetus; Cope, 1867

Type species
- †Delphinus calvertensis Harlan, 1842

Other species
- L. repenningi Barnes, 1978

= Lophocetus =

Lophocetus Temporal range: Late Miocene, 11.6–7.2 Ma

Extinct genus of dolphins

Lophocetus ("crested whale") is an extinct genus of dolphin belonging to the clade Delphinida that is known from late Miocene (Tortonian) marine deposits in California and Maryland. Although usually placed in Kentriodontidae, recent studies have found it only distantly related to Kentriodon.

== Discovery and taxonomy ==
Lophocetus was the first fossil odontocete to be described from North America. The type species, L. calvertensis, was originally described as Delphinus calvertensis by the American naturalist Richard Harlan in 1842 on the basis of USNM 16314, a skull from the St. Marys Formation of Maryland. Edward Drinker Cope subsequently recognized it as distinct from extant oceanic dolphins and considered it congeneric with the franciscana (as Pontoporia calvertensis), before renaming it as a distinct genus, Lophocetus.

The phylogenetic analysis of Brujadelphis recovered Lophocetus as polyphyletic, with L. calvertensis and L. repenningi forming a clade with taxa assigned to Pithanodelphininae and Tagicetus, and L. pappus falling as the sister taxon of Lipotidae. If "Lophocetus" pappus is a relative of the baiji, it would fill a gap in the early evolutionary history of the baiji because the oldest unambiguous extinct relative of the baiji, Parapontoporia, hails from younger marine deposits. However, a strict consensus phylogenetic analysis of the pontoporiid Scaldiporia recovers "Lophocetus" pappus outside the clade formed by Inioidea+Lipotidae and Delphinoidea, while recovering Lophocetus as a relative of beaked whales and Squaloziphius.

=== Reassigned species ===
In 1955, Remington Kellogg described a new species of Lophocetus, L. pappus, on the basis of the skull USNM 15985 from the Langhian-age Plum Point Member of the Calvert Formation. In 1978, however, Lawrence Barnes of the Los Angeles Museum of Natural History referred this species to the similarly Langhian-age genus Liolithax based on similarities in the earbone morphology, as Liolithax pappus. The new subfamily Lophocetinae was erected to accommodate Liolithax and Lophocetus, and Barnes also named Lophocetus repenningi on the basis of the skull USNM 23886 from the Tortonian-age Santa Margarita Formation of Santa Barbara, California. The assignment of Lophocetus pappus to Liolithax by Barnes (1978) was followed by several authors, including Ichishima et al. (1995), Dawson (1996), and Uhen et al. (2008), although Whitmore and Kaltenbach (2008) did not. However, in a couple of abstracts published in 2000 and 2008, Barnes and colleagues recognized Lophocetus pappus as a new genus of lophocetine distinct from Liolithax after the discovery of a skull from Middle Miocene marine deposits in Baja California Sur showed that Liolithax was a kentriodontine rather than a lophocetine and different from L. pappus in its smaller tooth diameter, smaller size, and more elongated rostrum. Godfrey and Lambert (2023) confirmed the generic distinctness of "L." pappus from Liolithax and erected the new genus Miminiacetus for it.
