= Liolithax =

Liolithax Temporal range: Middle Miocene, 13–11 Ma

Scientific classification
- Kingdom: Animalia
- Phylum: Chordata
- Class: Mammalia
- Order: Artiodactyla
- Infraorder: Cetacea
- Family: †Kentriodontidae
- Subfamily: †Kentriodontinae
- Genus: †Liolithax; Kellogg, 1931

Type species
- †Liolithax kernensis Kellogg, 1931

Extinct genus of dolphins

Liolithax is an extinct genus of dolphin from the Middle Miocene (Serravallian) Temblor Formation of California.

== Taxonomy ==
Liolithax kernensis, described by Remington Kellogg on the basis of the periotic CAS 4370 in 1931, was considered the only species of the genus until Barnes (1978) reassigned "Lophocetus" pappus to Liolithax based on similarities between the holotype periotic of L. kernensis and the periotic of L. pappus. Liolithax was grouped in Kampholophinae with Kampholophos by Barnes (1978, 1985).

The discovery of a skull from middle Miocene deposits in Baja California, Mexico cast doubt on the congenericity of "Lophocetus" pappus with the Liolithax type species by including a petrosal more similar to L. kernensis than to the petrosals included in the skulls of pappus. In a 2008 SVPCA abstract, Lawrence Barnes and colleagues noted that the Baja California skull differed from "Lophocetus" pappus in having a smaller tooth diameter, a more slender rostrum, and smaller size. They classified Liolithax in Kentriodontinae while stressing that "Lophocetus" pappus is a lophocetine in need of a new generic name. The cladistic analysis of Brujadelphis by Lambert et al. (2017) recovered "Lophocetus" pappus (as Liolithax pappus) as sister to Lipotidae, but did not test the phylogenetic relationships of Liolithax kernensis relative to Lipotidae, Iniidae, or other kentriodontids. The generic distinctness of "Lophocetus" pappus from the Liolithax type species was further confirmed by Godfrey and Lambert (2023), who erected the new genus Miminiacetus for L. pappus.
