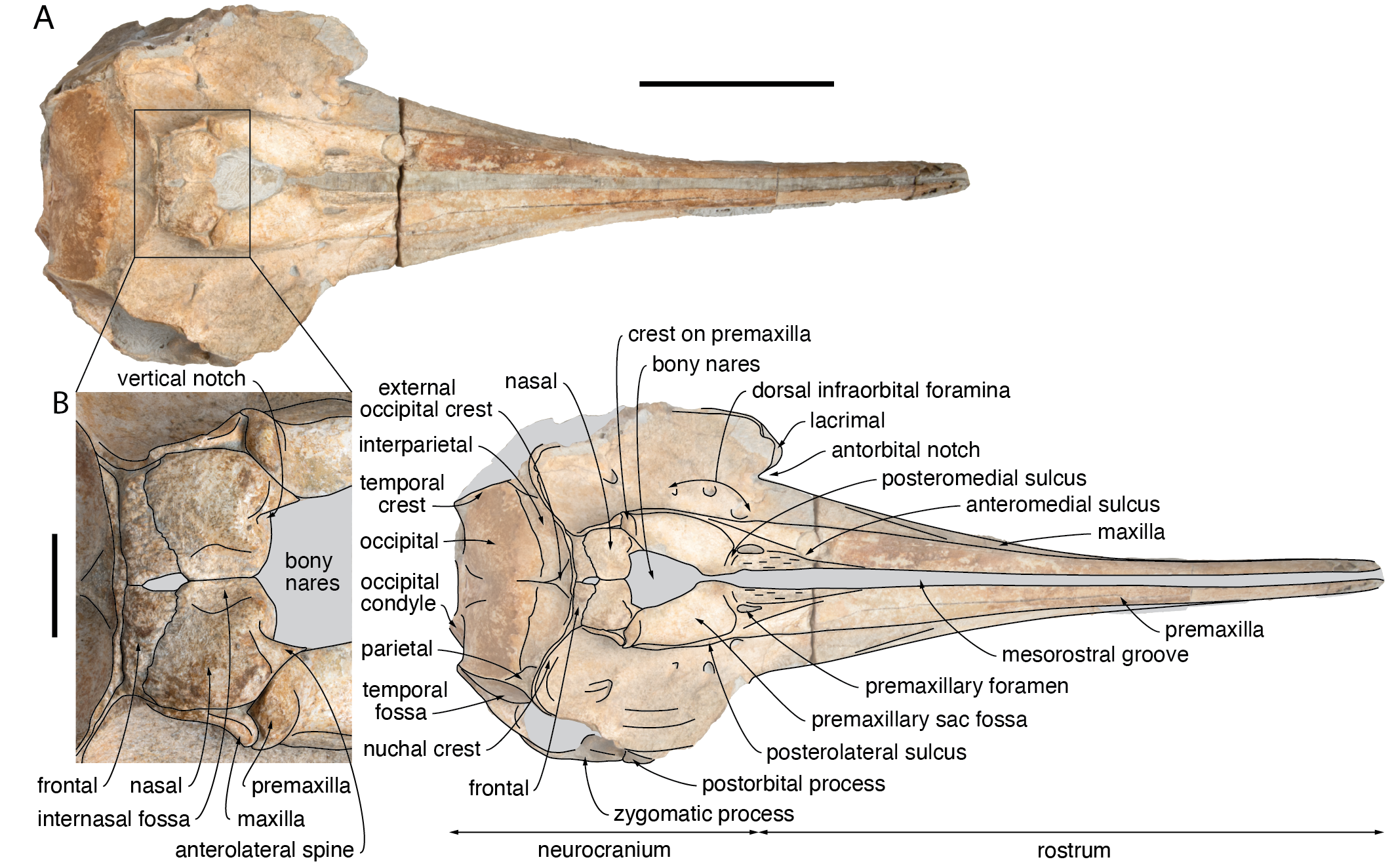
- Holotype skull

Scientific classification
- Kingdom: Animalia
- Phylum: Chordata
- Class: Mammalia
- Infraclass: Placentalia
- Order: Artiodactyla
- Infraorder: Cetacea
- Family: †Kentriodontidae
- Genus: †Mesokentriodon; Lambert et al., 2026
- Species: †M. protohumboldti

Binomial name
- †Mesokentriodon protohumboldti Lambert et al., 2026

= Mesokentriodon =

Mesokentriodon Temporal range: Middle Miocene (Langhian–Serravallian), 14.7–12.6 Ma

Extinct genus of cetacean

Mesokentriodon is an extinct genus of kentriodontid toothed whale known from the Middle Miocene (Langhian–Serravallian ages) Pisco Formation of Peru.

== Etymology ==
In 2026, Olivier Lambert and colleagues named Mesokentriodon protohumboldti as a new genus and species of kentriodontid odontocete (toothed whale) based on two autapomorphies (unique characteristics): a rostrum which was moderately elongated, and 40 teeth in the upper row.

The generic name Mesokentriodon derives from the Ancient Greek meso-, meaning intermediate, and the genus Kentriodon. The specific epithet of the type species, M. protohumboldti, contains the prefix proto-, meaning first or before, and references the Humboldt Current in the latter part.
