= Mereswine =

Mereswine may refer to:

- Dolphins, aquatic mammals related to porpoises and whales
- Porpoises, small cetaceans of the family Phocoenidae

== See also ==
- Delphinoidea, superfamily encompassing dolphins, porpoises and beluga whales.
