= Macrokentriodon =

Macrokentriodon Temporal range: Middle Miocene, 13–11 Ma

Scientific classification
- Domain: Eukaryota
- Kingdom: Animalia
- Phylum: Chordata
- Class: Mammalia
- Order: Artiodactyla
- Infraorder: Cetacea
- Family: †Kentriodontidae
- Subfamily: †Kentriodontinae
- Genus: †Macrokentriodon; Dawson, 1996

Extinct genus of dolphins

Macrokentriodon is an extinct genus of giant dolphin once assigned to the paraphyletic/polyphyletic family Kentriodontidae. Remains have been found in the late Miocene (Serravallian) Choptank Formation of United States.

Macrokentriodon is similar to Hadrodelphis in its larger size and its large tooth diameter. Despite being traditionally assigned to Kentriodontidae, recent cladistic analyses have recovered it along with Hadrodelphis in a clade with Kampholophos as sister to crown Delphinida and more derived than Kentriodon and Rudicetus.
