= Hadrodelphis =

Hadrodelphis Temporal range: Middle Miocene, 16–13.6 Ma

Scientific classification
- Domain: Eukaryota
- Kingdom: Animalia
- Phylum: Chordata
- Class: Mammalia
- Order: Artiodactyla
- Infraorder: Cetacea
- Family: †Kentriodontidae
- Genus: †Hadrodelphis; Dawson, 1996

Extinct genus of mammals

Hadrodelphis is an extinct genus of dolphin once assigned to the paraphyletic/polyphyletic family Kentriodontidae. Remains have been found in the middle Miocene (Langhian) Calvert Formation of United States.

== Taxonomy ==
Harodelphis is similar to Macrokentriodon in its larger size and its large tooth diameter. Despite being traditionally assigned to Kentriodontidae, recent cladistic analyses have recovered it along with Macrokentriodon in a clade with Kampholophos as sister to crown Delphinida and more derived than Kentriodon and Rudicetus.

Hadrodelphis poseidon was described from two isolated teeth from Miocene deposits in west-central France in 1971, but its validity was questioned by Dawson (1996).
