= Septemtriocetus =

Septemtriocetus Temporal range: 3.60–2.59 Ma

Scientific classification
- Domain: Eukaryota
- Kingdom: Animalia
- Phylum: Chordata
- Class: Mammalia
- Order: Artiodactyla
- Suborder: Whippomorpha
- Infraorder: Cetacea
- Family: Phocoenidae
- Genus: †Septemtriocetus; Lambert, 2008
- Species: †S. bosselaersi

Binomial name
- †Septemtriocetus bosselaersi Lambert, 2008

Extinct genus of toothed whale

Septemtriocetus is an extinct genus of toothed whale from the late Cenozoic.

== Distribution ==
Fossils of this species were found at the Verrebroek dock, northwest of Antwerp, in Belgium, at the border with the Netherlands.
