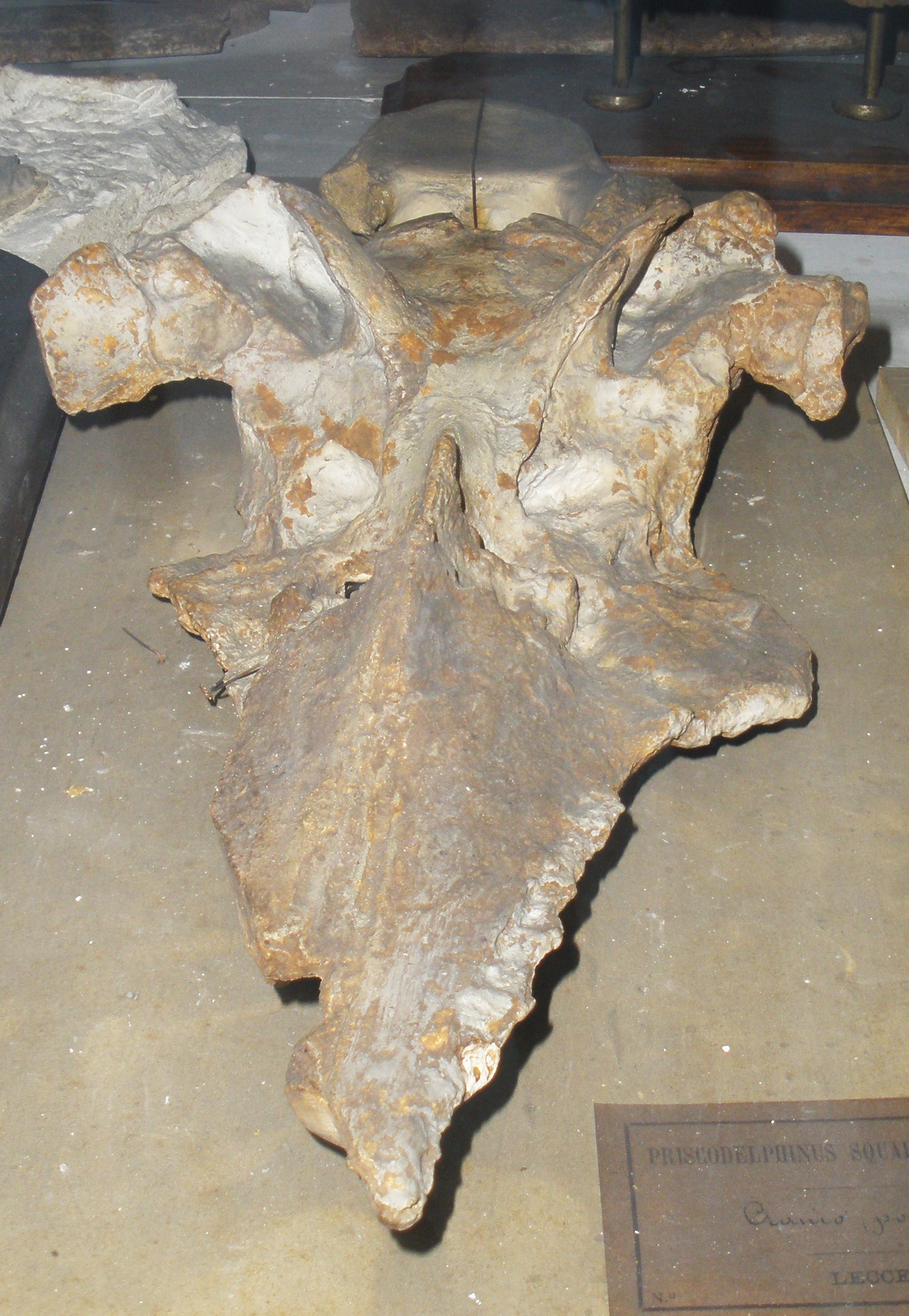
- Rudicetus squalodontoides skull

Scientific classification
- Kingdom: Animalia
- Phylum: Chordata
- Class: Mammalia
- Infraclass: Placentalia
- Order: Artiodactyla
- Infraorder: Cetacea
- Clade: Delphinida
- Superfamily: Delphinoidea
- Family: †Kentriodontidae; Slijper, 1936

Genera
- See text

= Kentriodontidae =

Kentriodontidae Temporal range: Oligocene to Pliocene

Extinct family of dolphin relatives

Kentriodontidae is an extinct family of odontocete whales related to modern dolphins. The Kentriodontidae lived from the Oligocene to the Pliocene before going extinct.

== Taxonomy ==
Kentriodontids have been variously divided into three or four subfamilies: Kampholophinae, Kentriodontinae, Lophocetinae, and Pithanodelphinae. However, some cladistic studies have recovered Kentriodontidae as paraphyletic while others have recovered the family as monophyletic.

For instance, Miminiacetus may be a close relative of Lipotidae, Brevirostrodelpis is basal to other delphinidans, Incacetus is probably a member of Inioidea, and Atocetus and Lophocetus have been recovered as the sister taxa to pontoporiids and ziphiids, respectively, while Hadrodelphis, Kampholophos, Macrokentriodon, and Miminiacetus are recovered in a clade phylogenetically intermediate between Kentriodon and derived delphinidans ((Inioidea + Lipotidae) + Delphinoidea). Peredo et al. (2018) restrict Kentriodon to Kampholophos, Kentriodon, Rudicetus, and Wimahl, and remove Pithanodelphininae and its putative constituent genera (Leptodelphis, Pithanodelphis, Sarmatodelphis, Sophianacetus, and Tagicetus) as well as Microphocaena from Kentriodontidae.

=== Genera ===
- Kampholophos
- Kentriodon
- Mesokentriodon
- Rudicetus
- Sophianaecetus
- Wimahl
- Belonodelphis?
- Liolithax?
