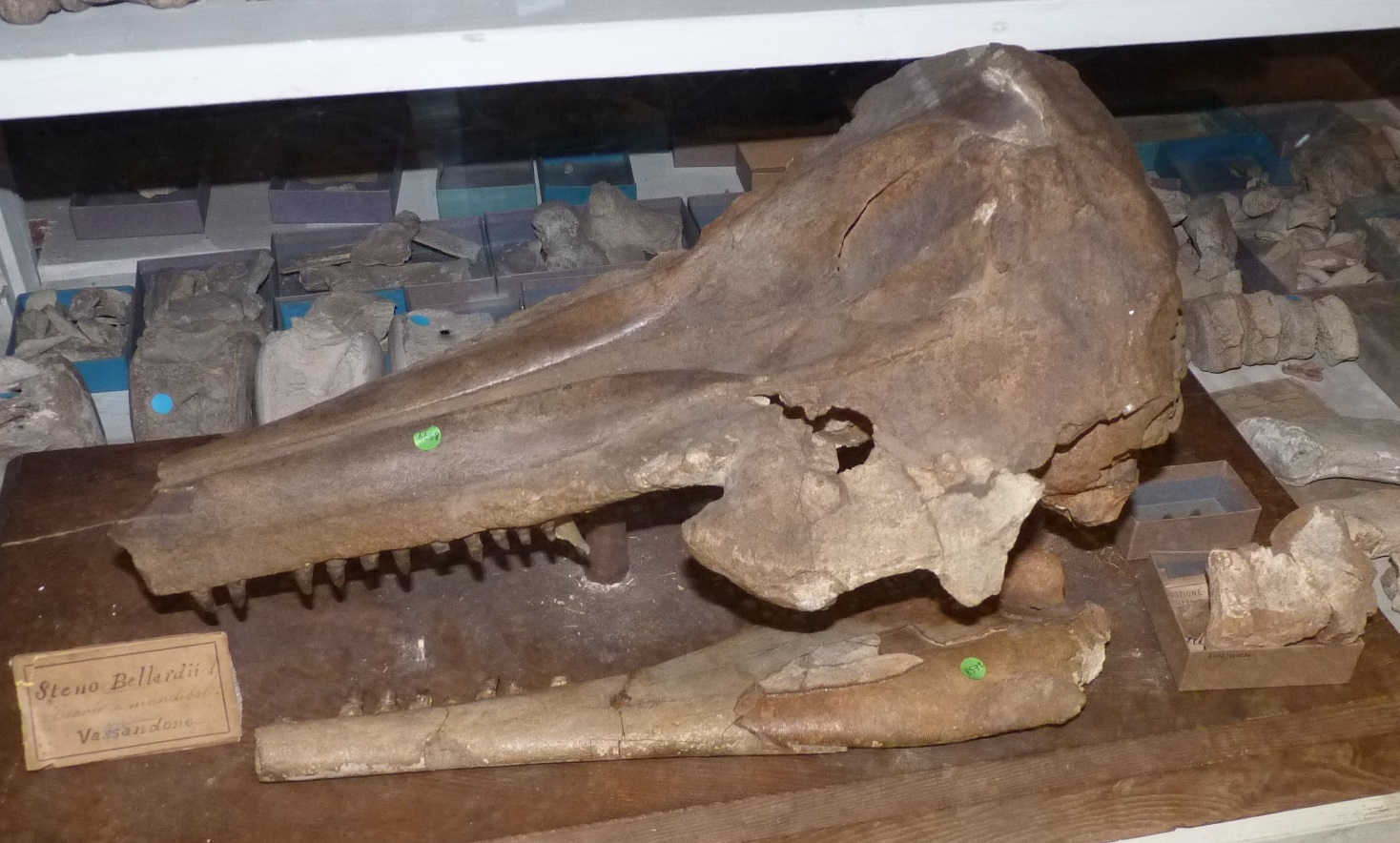
- E. giulii skull, formerly referred to as Steno bellardii

Scientific classification
- Domain: Eukaryota
- Kingdom: Animalia
- Phylum: Chordata
- Class: Mammalia
- Order: Artiodactyla
- Infraorder: Cetacea
- Family: Delphinidae
- Genus: †Etruridelphis; Bianucci et al., 2009

Species
- E. giulii, Bianucci et al., 2009

= Etruridelphis =

Etruridelphis Temporal range: Pliocene

Extinct genus of mammals

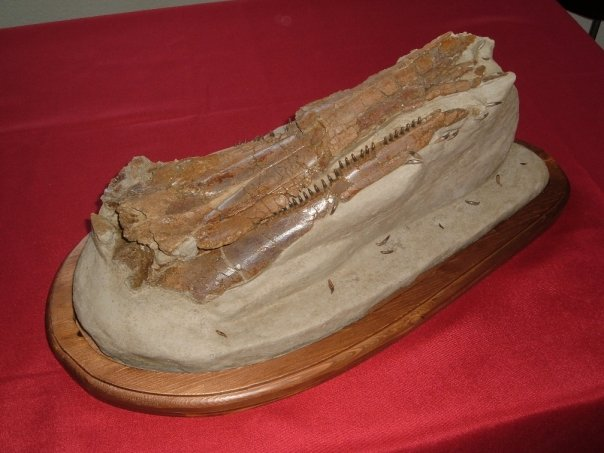
E. giulii skull

Etruridelphis is an extinct genus of cetacean.
