= Wimahl =

Wimahl Temporal range: Aquitanian–Burdigalian

Scientific classification
- Kingdom: Animalia
- Phylum: Chordata
- Class: Mammalia
- Order: Artiodactyla
- Infraorder: Cetacea
- Family: †Kentriodontidae
- Genus: †Wimahl; Peredo, Uhlen & Nelson, 2018
- Species: †W. chinookensis

Binomial name
- †Wimahl chinookensis Peredo, Uhlen & Nelson, 2018

Extinct genus of cetaceans

Wimahl is a genus of cetacean that belongs to the family Kentriodontidae. It lived in the Miocene period. It contains a single species, Wimahl chinookensis. The name Wimahl translates to "big river" in the local Chinook language.

== Discovery ==
There is one known specimen. It includes a complete skull, some vertebrae, and parts of both flippers, and is labelled as UWBM 88078. It was found in 2003 near the north bank of the Columbia River, in Washington.
