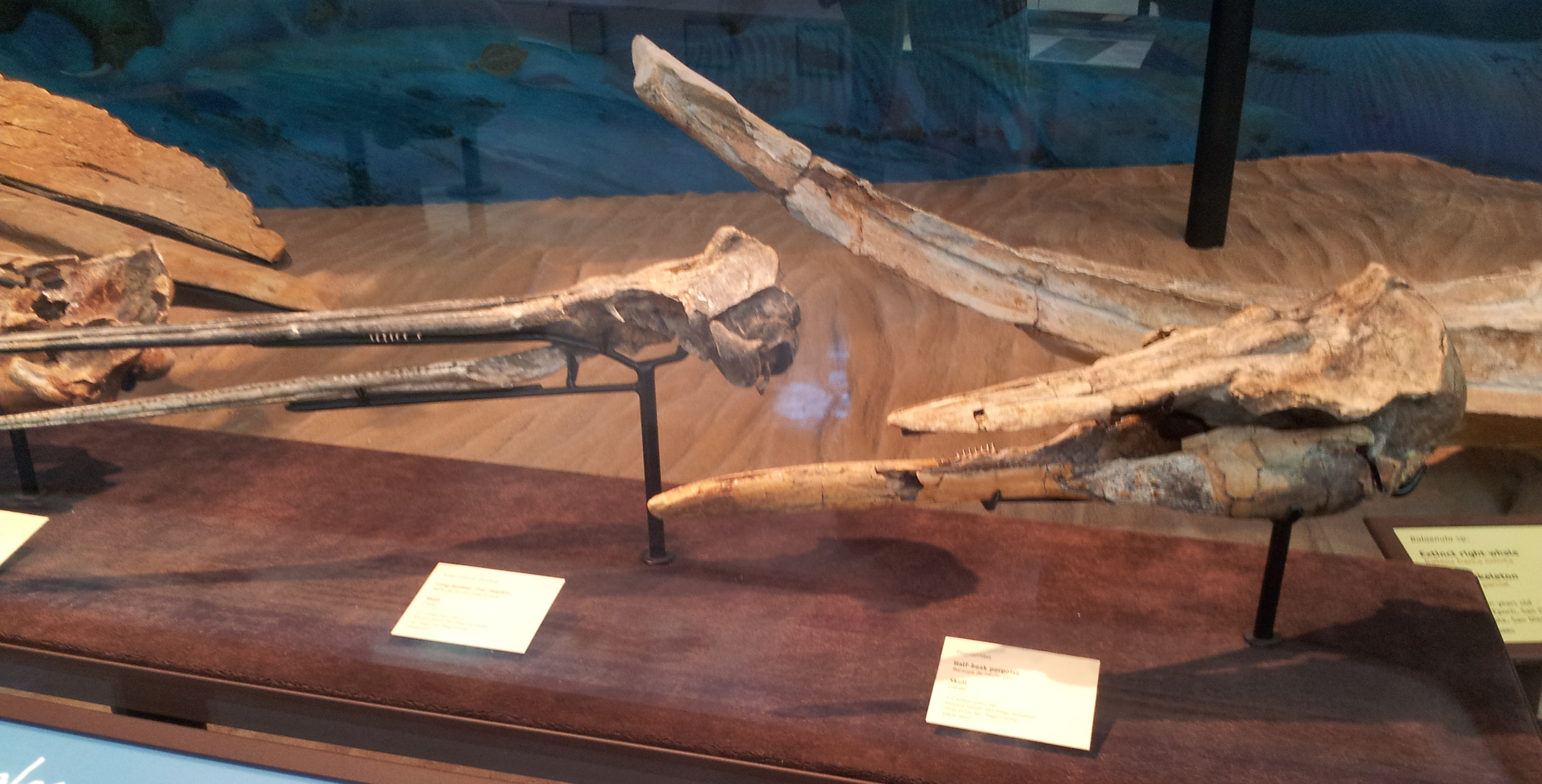
- Skull of Parapontoporia (left) and Semirostrum (right).
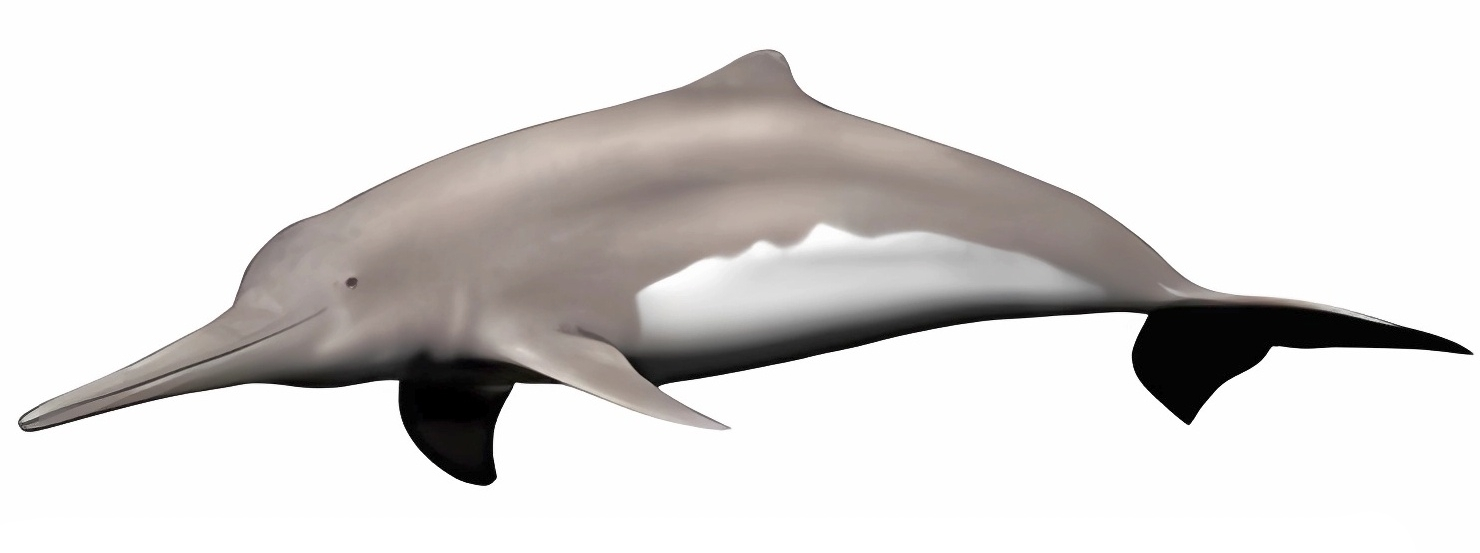
- Life reconstruction of Parapontoporia

Scientific classification
- Kingdom: Animalia
- Phylum: Chordata
- Class: Mammalia
- Order: Artiodactyla
- Infraorder: Cetacea
- Family: Lipotidae
- Genus: †Parapontoporia; Barnes, 1984

Type species
- †Parapontoporia pacifica

Species
- P. pacifica Barnes, 1984; P. sternbergi Gregory and Kellogg, 1927; P. wilsoni Barnes, 1985

= Parapontoporia =

Parapontoporia Temporal range: Late Miocene–Pliocene

Extinct genus of mammals

Parapontoporia is an extinct genus of lipotoid dolphin that lived during the Late Miocene to the Pliocene epochs. This genus can be found attributed across the North American coast of the Pacific Ocean. Fossils have been found in Tulare Formation of California and the Almejas Formation of Mexico.

== Taxonomy ==
Parapontoporia is a member of the family Lipotidae meaning that it is closely related and likely a sister taxon to the baiji (Chinese river dolphin). Within this genus there are three species; P. pacifica (type species), P. sternbergi and P. wilsoni.

== Distribution ==
Parapontoporia is widely distributed across the Pacific coast of North America being found in numerous marine formations. This area includes California, Baja California and possibly Japan.

They first appeared during the late and middle Miocene epoch with this genus during the Neogene becoming one of the most abundantly found genus of odontocetes from the eastern North Pacific. It went extinct during the Pliocene.

== Description ==
It was a diminutive genus.

The morphology of the cochlea of Parapontoporia is similar to other species of toothed whales and similar between the three species. All species have approximately two turns with relatively wide inter-turn distances (0.752 to 1.26 mm) similar to the Irrawaddy dolphin and the melon-headed whale. It has a thin canaliculi cochleae and relatively thin, short canals leading to the fenestrae cochleae. The cochlear hook, starting at the fenestra cochleae, is short and wide resembling that of delphinids. This hook leads to the scala tympani which has a wide base but narrows as it reaches the apex of the cochlea.

== Ecology ==
This genus was probably inhabiting primarily shallow marine environments. However fossil material of Parapontoporia have been found in the upper Tulare Formation, central California which has a mix of terrestrial vertebrate fossils suggesting that this formation is predominately freshwater. This suggests that it did not excessively inhabit a single habitat and may have been tolerant of both salt, fresh and brackish water conditions.

Parapontoporia was likely to have been able to echolocate and hear within narrow-band high frequencies (NBHF) with some species of this genus being NBHF specialist. It is hypothesized that this may have evolved in Parapontoporia to navigate transitional habitats such are rivers.
