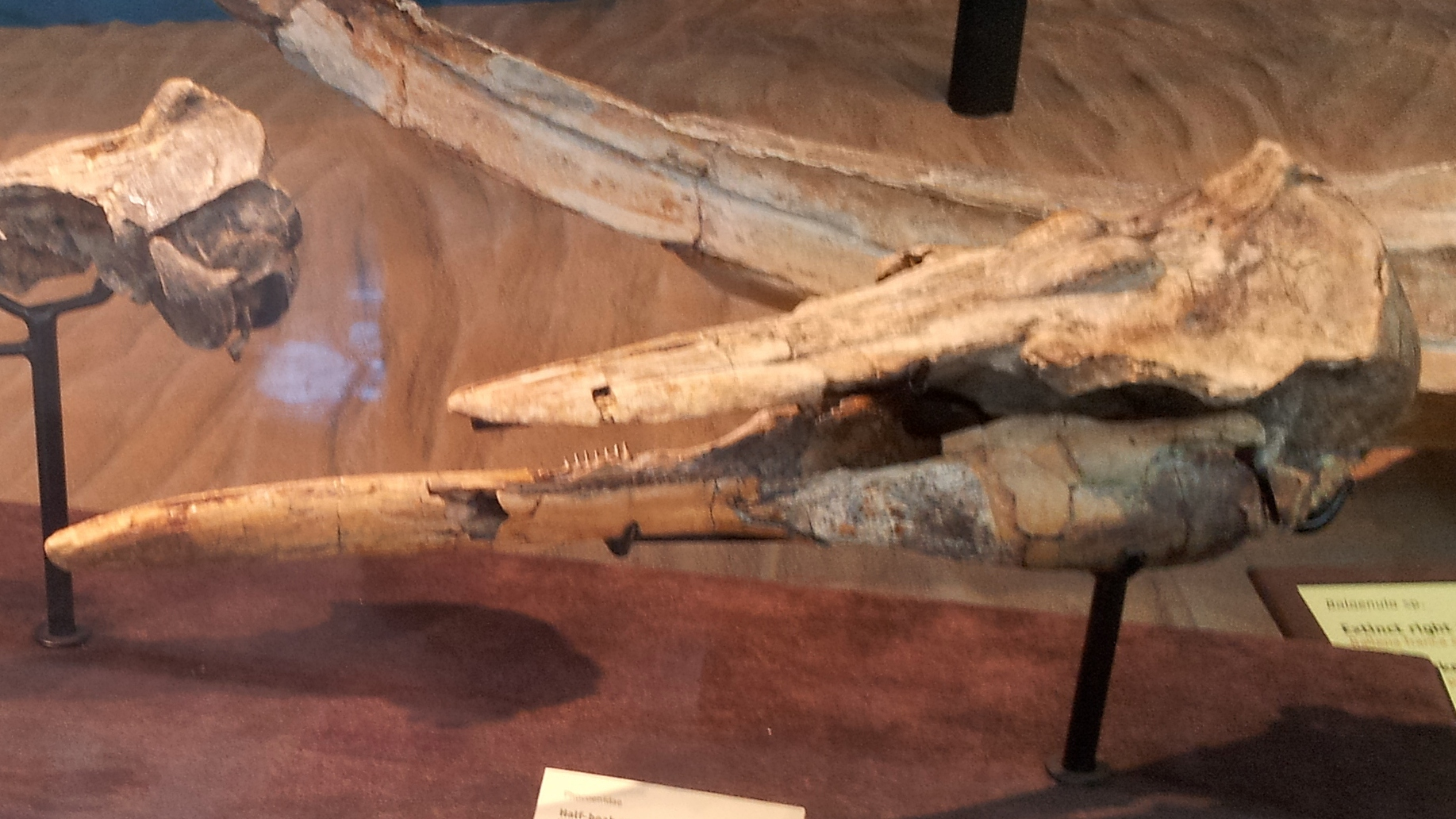
- Skull

Scientific classification
- Kingdom: Animalia
- Phylum: Chordata
- Class: Mammalia
- Order: Artiodactyla
- Infraorder: Cetacea
- Family: Phocoenidae
- Genus: †Semirostrum; Racicot et al., 2014
- Species: †S. ceruttii

Binomial name
- †Semirostrum ceruttii Racicot et al., 2014

= Semirostrum =

Semirostrum Temporal range: Pliocene

Extinct genus of porpoises

Semirostrum ceruttii is an extinct porpoise that lived between 5 and 1.5 million years ago (Ma), during the Pliocene epoch. The species is highly distinctive due to the extremely long symphysis on the lower jaw, reaching lengths of 85 centimeters (33.46 in), while that of a modern porpoise is 1–2 centimeters (0.39–0.79 in) long. The main hypothesis regarding its use is that it probed along the sediment in the murky estuaries and shores of what is now California in search of food, which would easily be scooped up the symphysis and into the jaws. It is the only known species in the genus Semirostrum. The etymology of the name means "half beak", referring to the upper jaw being half the length of the lower.

Fossils of Semirostrum have an unusually long, fused symphysis, longer than any known mammal. CT scans revealed elongate mental and accessory canals within the symphysis, which are similar to those found in birds of the genus Rynchops, meaning that the elongated symphysis was likely involved in sensory function.

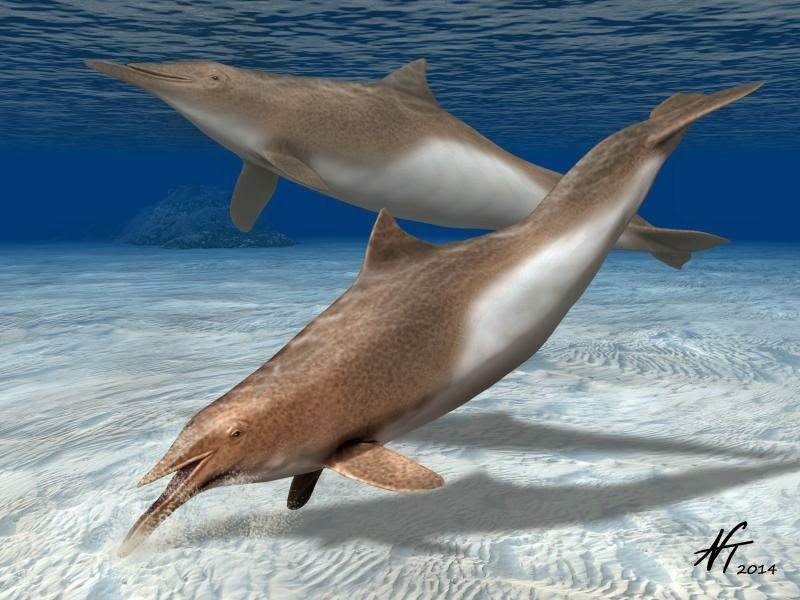
S. ceruttii restoration
