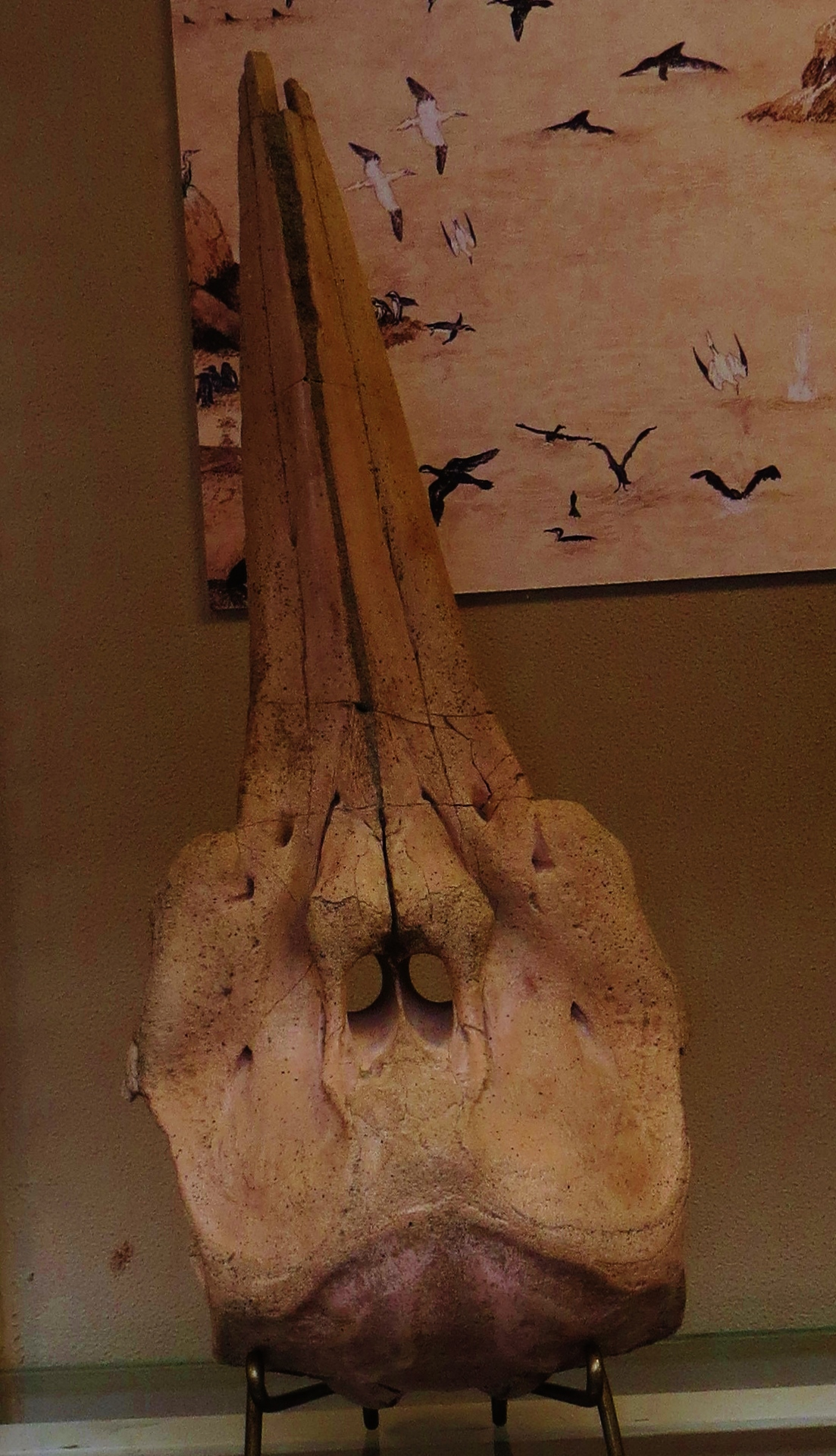
- Fossil of Lomacetus

Scientific classification
- Kingdom: Animalia
- Phylum: Chordata
- Class: Mammalia
- Order: Artiodactyla
- Infraorder: Cetacea
- Family: Phocoenidae
- Genus: †Lomacetus; Muizon, 1986

Type species
- Lomacetus ginsburgi Muizon, 1986

= Lomacetus =

Lomacetus Temporal range: 11.6–7.2 Ma Miocene

Extinct genus of porpoise

Lomacetus is an extinct genus of porpoise belonging to the family Phocoenidae. It is a significant find in the fossil record because it is the first known fossil of the subfamily Phocoeninae, which includes all living porpoises.
