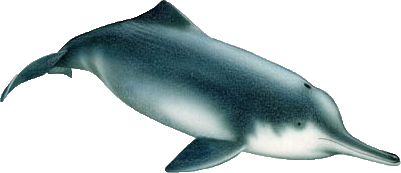
- Lipotes vexillifer

Scientific classification
- Kingdom: Animalia
- Phylum: Chordata
- Class: Mammalia
- Infraclass: Placentalia
- Order: Artiodactyla
- Infraorder: Cetacea
- Parvorder: Odontoceti
- Clade: Delphinida
- Superfamily: Lipotoidea
- Family: Lipotidae; Zhou, Qian & Li, 1978

Genera
- See text

= Lipotidae =

Pacific river dolphins Temporal range: Miocene–Recent

Family of river dolphins

Lipotidae is a possibly extinct family of river dolphins containing the critically endangered/functionally extinct Chinese river dolphin baiji and the fossil genus Parapontoporia from the Pacific coast of North America during the Late Miocene and Pliocene The genus Prolipotes, which is based on a mandible fragment from Neogene coastal deposits in Guangxi, China, has been classified as an extinct relative of the baiji, but is dubious. The oldest known member of the family is Eolipotes from the Late Miocene of Japan.

The only species of the Lipotidae family that has flourished until recent times is the baiji (Lipotes vexillifer), which lives only in the lower Yangtze River system, but its population has declined drastically since the second half of the 20th century due to the severe encroachment of industrial and fishing activities in China, and is thought to have become functional extinct in the early 21st century. The last confirmed specimen, a captive male named Qi Qi, died in a Wuhan dolphinarium 2002, and the freshwater dolphin expedition in 2006 failed to find any wild specimen, although sporadic unconfirmed sightings have been reported since 2007.

The putative kentriodontid "Lophocetus" pappus is a possible relative of Lipotidae.

== Genera and species ==
- †(?) Lipotes
  - †(?) L. vexillifer
- †Parapontoporia
  - †P. pacifica
  - †P. sternbergi
  - †P. wilsoni
- †Prolipotes
  - †P. yujiangensis
- †Eolipotes
  - †E. japonicus
