= Brujadelphis =

Brujadelphis Temporal range: Middle Miocene (Laventan) ~13.6–11.6 Ma

Scientific classification
- Domain: Eukaryota
- Kingdom: Animalia
- Phylum: Chordata
- Class: Mammalia
- Order: Artiodactyla
- Infraorder: Cetacea
- Family: incertae sedis
- Genus: †Brujadelphis; Lambert et al. 2017
- Species: †B. ankylorostris

Binomial name
- †Brujadelphis ankylorostris Lambert et al. 2017

Extinct genus of mammals

Brujadelphis is an extinct genus of river dolphin-like cetaceans of uncertain family placement from the Late Miocene epoch (Serravallian) of present-day Peru. The type species is Brujadelphis ankylorostris, recovered from the Pisco Formation.
