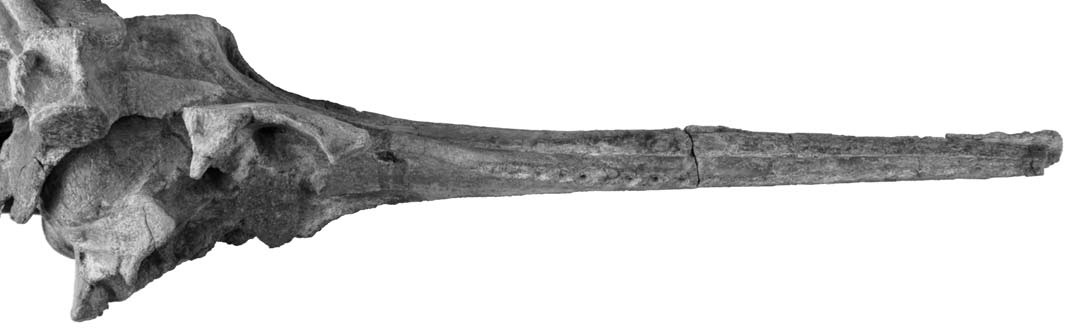

Scientific classification
- Kingdom: Animalia
- Phylum: Chordata
- Class: Mammalia
- Order: Artiodactyla
- Infraorder: Cetacea
- Family: †Kentriodontidae
- Genus: †Tagicetus; Lambert, Stevens, and Smith, 2005

Species
- T. joneti Lambert, Stevens, and Smith, 2005

= Tagicetus =

Extinct genus of mammals

Tagicetus is an extinct genus of dolphin belonging to the polyphyletic family Kentriodontidae.

Although classified in the subfamily Kentriodontinae by Lambert et al. (2005), recent cladistic analysis places it as closer to extant delphinoids than to Kentriodon.
