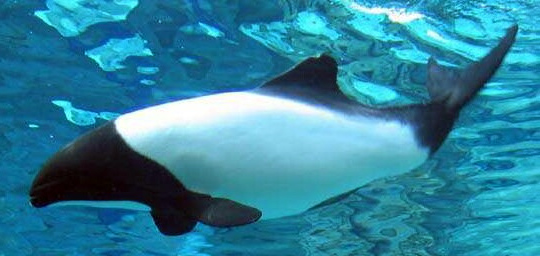
- A Commerson's dolphin

Scientific classification
- Domain: Eukaryota
- Kingdom: Animalia
- Phylum: Chordata
- Class: Mammalia
- Order: Artiodactyla
- Infraorder: Cetacea
- Parvorder: Odontoceti
- Clade: Delphinida; Muizon, 1984

Superfamilies
- Delphinoidea; Inioidea †(?)Lipotoidea

= Delphinida =

Delphinida Temporal range: Oligocene to Recent

Clade of mammals

Delphinida is a clade of cetaceans in the parvorder Odontoceti, the toothed whales. It includes all modern oceanic dolphins, porpoises, and their relatives, such as Lipotidae and Iniidae.

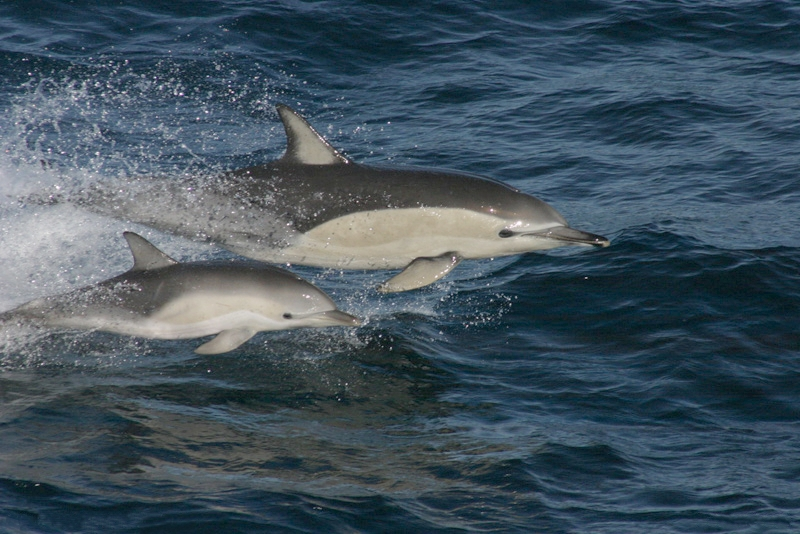
Short-beaked common dolphin (Delphinus delphis)
