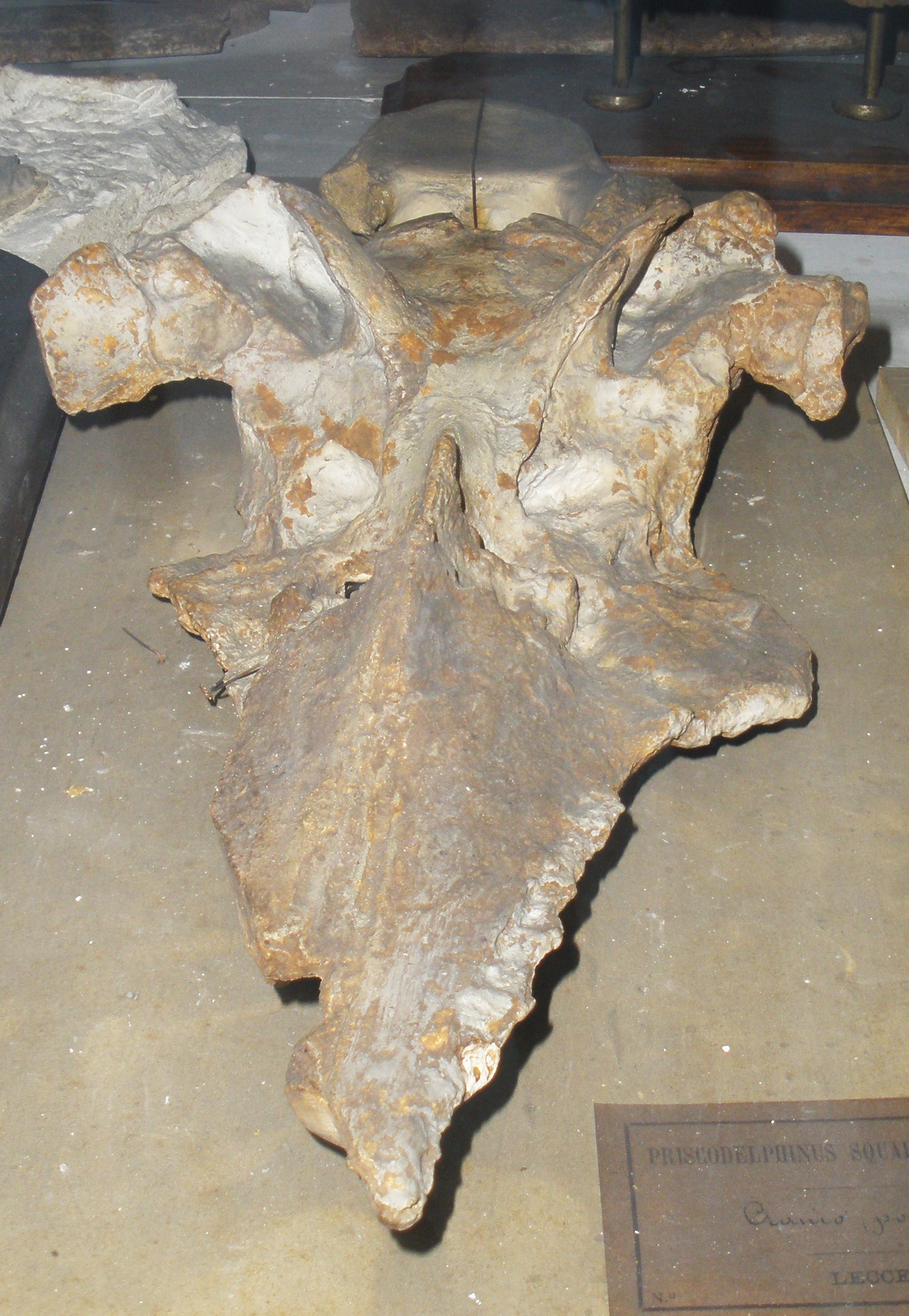
- Rudicetus squalodontoides skull

Scientific classification
- Domain: Eukaryota
- Kingdom: Animalia
- Phylum: Chordata
- Class: Mammalia
- Order: Artiodactyla
- Infraorder: Cetacea
- Family: †Kentriodontidae
- Genus: †Rudicetus; Bianucci, 2001
- Species: †R. squalodontoides

Binomial name
- †Rudicetus squalodontoides Capellini, 1878

Synonyms
- Priscodelphinus squalodontoides

= Rudicetus =

Extinct genus of mammals

Rudicetus is an extinct genus of cetacean.

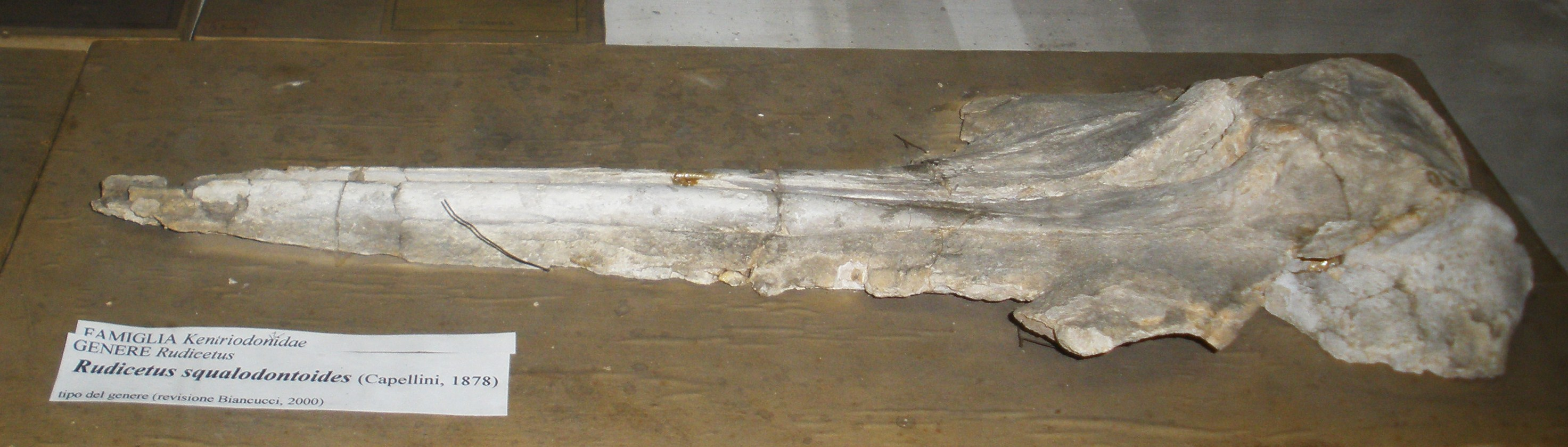
Skull
