= Remington Kellogg =

American paleontologist

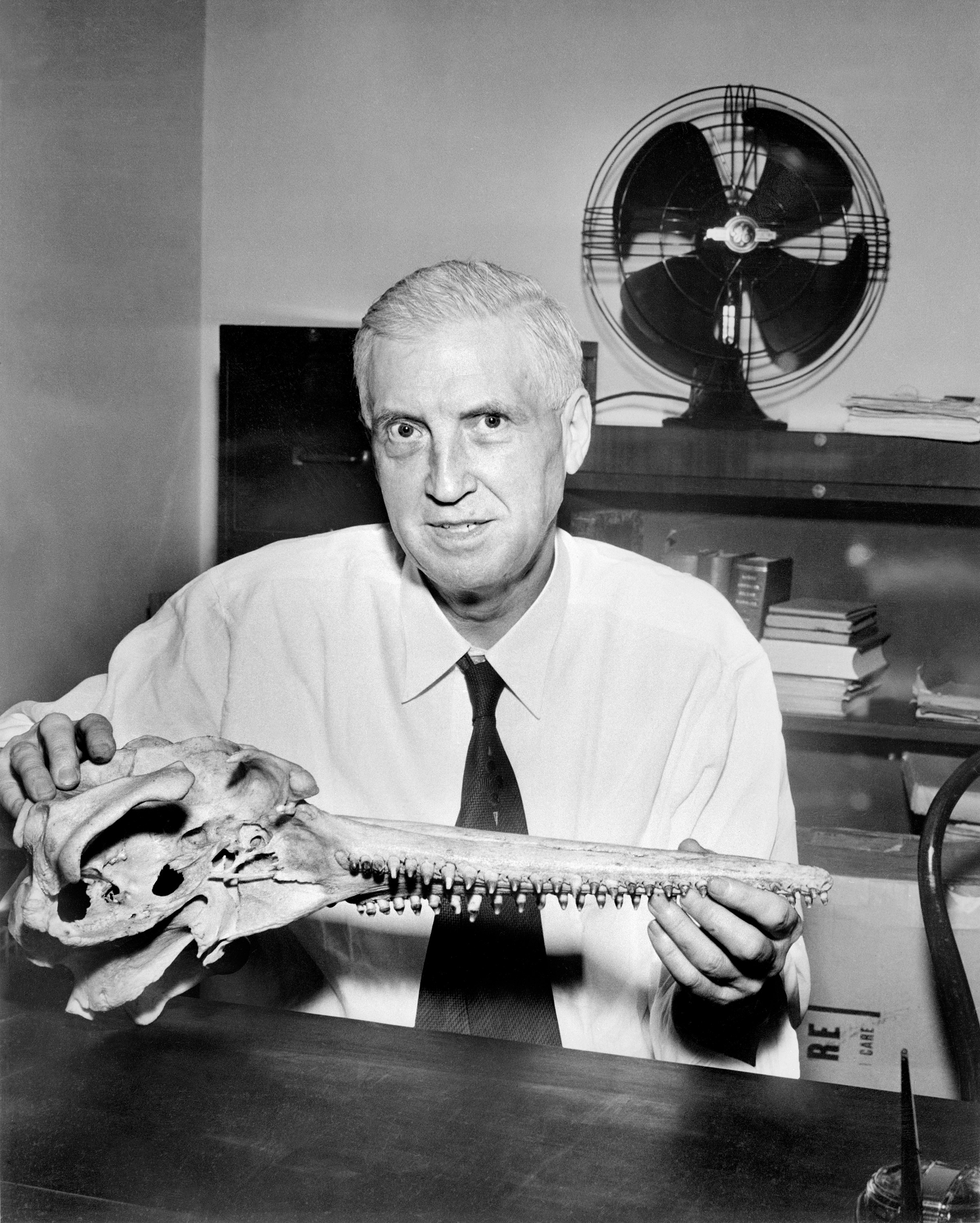
- Born: 5 October 1892; Davenport, Iowa
- Died: 8 May 1969 (aged 76); Washington, D.C.
- Occupation: Zoologist
- Spouse: Marguerite Henrich

Arthur Remington Kellogg (5 October 1892 – 8 May 1969) was an American naturalist and a director of the United States National Museum. His work focused on marine mammals.

== Early life and career ==
Kellogg was born in Davenport, Iowa, and quickly dropped the name "Arthur". From a young age he devoted his free time to the study of wildlife. He built up his own small collection of mounted birds and mammals and by the time he came to choose a university he had determined he would become a naturalist. Choosing the University of Kansas as it offered courses in his chosen field, he first studied entomology, later switching to the study of mammals. From 1913 to 1916 he worked under Charles D. Bunker, the curator of birds and mammals at the university's Museum of Natural History. He published his first paper as a result of his work with Bunker. Kellogg graduated in 1915 and received his M.A. the following year.

After graduating, he immediately began work with the United States Bureau of Biological Survey in Kansas and North Dakota. At the end of 1915 the Survey paid for him to travel to Washington, D.C. from where he undertook a tour of the museums of the eastern states. Around this time he decided to specialize in the study of marine mammals and in 1916 enrolled the University of California at Berkeley where he studied for a Ph.D. in zoology. He was given a teaching fellowship at the behest of John C. Merriam, and studied fossil pinnipeds, producing his first important papers on the subject in 1920 and 1921.

He served in the Army in France during World War I, but still found time to collect specimens which he sent back to Berkeley and the University of Kansas. He was discharged in July 1919 and returned to Berkeley to complete his doctorate, transferring from zoology to study vertebrate paleontology under Merriam.

In 1921 he became assistant biologist for the Biological Survey based in Washington, and worked there for the next eight years, concerned chiefly with studying toads and the feeding habits of hawks and owls. He also undertook a study to determine whether alligators were a predatory risk to help resolve controversy over their hunting. Merriam encouraged Kellogg to use his free time to study the fossilized marine mammals of Calvert Cliffs in Maryland. He added considerably to the collections created by previous expeditions and used the experience he gained as the basis for his Ph.D. thesis, entitled The History of Whales - Their Adaptation to Life in the Water in which he studied the specializations needed for mammalian organs to adjust to life in water.

In 1928 Kellogg became assistant curator at the United States National Museum and in 1941 became curator. At the museum he devoted time to studying the Archaeoceti, primitive whales from the Eocene and early Oligocene, and the Miocene Cetacea of North America. In 1948 he was appointed director of the Museum and in 1958 was made assistant secretary of the Smithsonian Institution. He was elected to the National Academy of Sciences in 1951. He was later elected to the American Philosophical Society in 1955 and the American Academy of Arts and Sciences in 1960.

His Ph.D. thesis had established him as an authority on cetaceans, and with concern growing over the need to protect whales from over-exploitation, in 1930 he was invited to speak at a conference on whaling held by the League of Nations. Further conferences followed and Kellogg was appointed as a US delegate to the International Conference on Whaling held in London in 1937, which resulted in the first protection for whales, the International Agreement for the Regulation of Whaling. Kellogg was head of the US delegation in two further conferences in 1944 and 1945 and was chairman of the 1946 conference, after which he became the US commissioner on International Whaling Commission between 1949 and 1967. He served as vice-chairman of the Commission between 1949 and 1951 and chairman between 1952 and 1954.

== Later life ==
He retired from his posts at the Smithsonian in 1962, but continued to work on his study of Miocene Cetacea, publishing nine papers on fossil marine mammals between 1965 and 1969. Ill-health, coupled with frustration over the lack of progress, forced him to abandon his work with the International Whaling Commission after 1964.

He died of a heart attack at his home in Washington on 8 May 1969 whilst recuperating from a broken pelvis.
