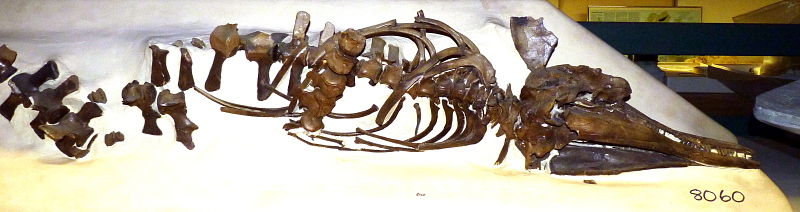
- K. pernix skeleton

Scientific classification
- Kingdom: Animalia
- Phylum: Chordata
- Class: Mammalia
- Order: Artiodactyla
- Infraorder: Cetacea
- Family: †Kentriodontidae
- Genus: †Kentriodon; Kellogg, 1927

Species
- K. pernix Kellogg, 1927 (type); K. obscurus (Kellogg, 1931); K. diusinus Salinas Márquez et al., 2014; K. fuchsii (Brandt, 1873); K. hobetsu Ichishima, 1995; K. hoepfneri Kazár & Hampe, 2014; K. schneideri Whitmore & Kaltenbach, 2008; K. nakajimai Kimura & Hasegawa, 2019; K. sugawarai Guo & Kohno, 2021

Synonyms
- Grypolithax Kellogg, 1931

= Kentriodon =

Kentriodon Temporal range: Late Oligocene–Middle Miocene

Extinct genus of mammals

Kentriodon is an extinct genus of toothed whale related to modern-day dolphins. Fossils have been found in North America, Europe and Japan. Several species have been described.

== Description ==
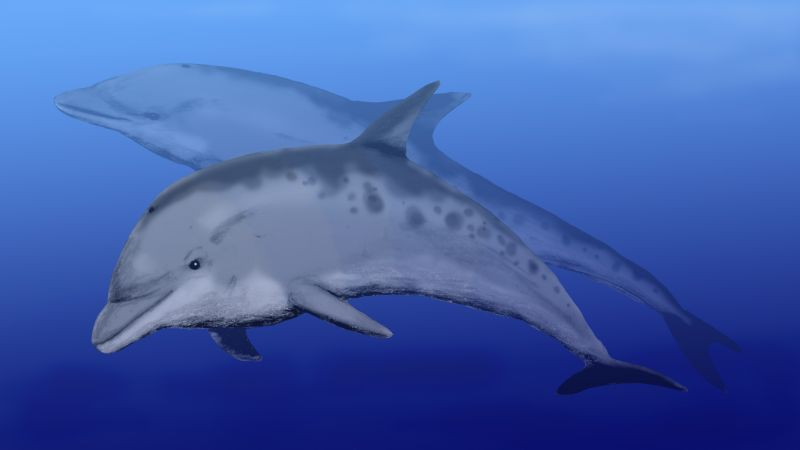
Restoration of two K. pernix

Kentriodon was the most diverse of all the kentriodontids, which are represented by seventeen described genera. These were small to medium-sized odontocetes with largely symmetrical skulls, and thought likely to include ancestors of some modern species. Kentriodon is also the oldest described kentriodontid genus, reported from the Late Oligocene to the Middle Miocene.

Kentriodontines ate small fish and other nectonic organisms; they are thought to have been active echolocators, and might have formed pods. The diversity, morphology and distribution of fossils appear parallel to some modern species.

== Species ==
- Kentriodon pernix Kellogg, 1927 (type)
- Kentriodon fuchsii (Brandt, 1873)
- Kentriodon hobetsu Ichishima, 1995
- Kentriodon obscurus (Kellogg, 1931)
- Kentriodon schneideri Whitmore and Kaltenbach, 2008
- Kentriodon diusinus Salinas-Márquez, Barnes, Flores-Trujillo, Aranda-Manteca, 2014
- Kentriodon hoepfneri Kazár & Hampe, 2014
- Kentriodon nakajimai Kimura & Hasegawa, 2019
- Kentriodon sugawarai Guo & Kohno, 2021

== See also ==
- Evolution of cetaceans
