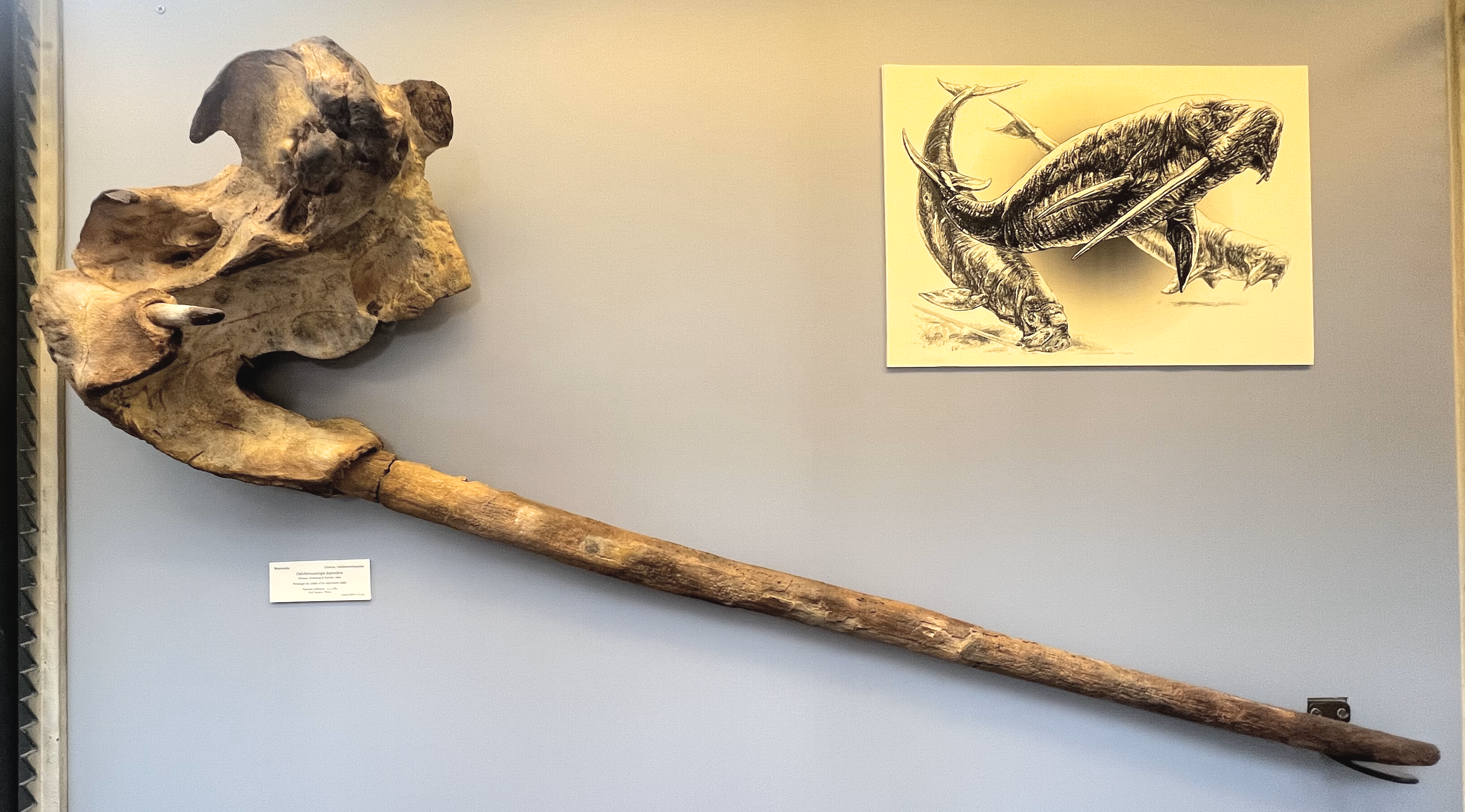
- O. leptodon skull (MNHN SAO 202) at the National Museum of Natural History, France

Scientific classification
- Kingdom: Animalia
- Phylum: Chordata
- Class: Mammalia
- Order: Artiodactyla
- Infraorder: Cetacea
- Superfamily: Delphinoidea
- Family: †Odobenocetopsidae; Muizon, 1993
- Genus: †Odobenocetops; Muizon, 1993

Type species
- †Odobenocetops peruvianus Muizon, 1993

Species
- O. peruvianus Muizon, 1993; O. leptodon Muizon, Domning & Parrish, 1999

= Odobenocetops =

Odobenocetops Temporal range: Late Miocene (Tortonian to Messinian)

Extinct genus of mammals

Odobenocetops (/ˌoʊdəbiːˈnɒsɪtɒps/) is an extinct genus of small toothed whale that inhabited the southwestern coast of South America during the late Miocene. Two species of Odobenocetops are currently recognized, O. peruvianus and the slightly younger O. leptodon, both known from the Pisco Formation of Peru. More disarticulated, indeterminate remains are also known from the Bahía Inglesa Formation of Chile.

Odobenocetops is mostly known for its large asymmetric tusks, which emerge from pronounced processes formed by the premaxillae, known as the alveolar sheaths. These tusks are thought to be sexually dimorphic and are only strongly pronounced in male individuals, while females appear to possess two similarly sized tusks. In the holotype of O. peruvianus the elongated right tusk is broken, leaving its precise length ambiguous. O. leptodon on the other hand preserves complete tusks, showing that at least in this species the longer tusk reached a total length of 1.35 metres (4 ft 5 in) long, 1.07 metres (3 ft 6 in) of which is located outside of the alveolar sheath. While these tusks are reminiscent of the tusk seen in the closely related narwhals, they evolved independently. Their purpose remains unknown, but the most common interpretation is that they served a non-violent social role, as they are too fragile for combat. The alveolar sheaths on the other hand may have been used as orientation guides during foraging. Besides the two tusks in the upper jaw, Odobenocetops is thought to have been toothless.

Another difference between this genus and other whales is that the melon, an organ important for echolocation, is reduced in O. leptodon and vestigial or entirely absent in O. peruvianus. At least the older species compensated for this by having large, dorsally located eyes giving it binocular vision. The fact that only the older species lost its melon has been taken as evidence that they were sister taxa, rather than one species evolving directly from the other. In addition to their vision or echolocation, Christian de Muizon argues that they may have possessed tactile hair, which is also found in walrus and to a lesser extent in Amazon river dolphins.

Odobenocetops is among the cetaceans with the greatest range of head motion, exceeding even the values of the beluga whale. This may have helped while foraging, extending the neck in a way that keeps their tusks roughly parallel to the rest of the body. Due to the anatomy of the palate and other similarities to the walrus, it is thought that this whale was a suctionfeeding molluscivore, searching for bivalves on the ocean floor, uncovering them with precise jets of water, grasping the uncovered molluscs with a powerful upper lip and using its tongue like a piston to suck out the soft parts of their prey, leaving the shell intact.

== History and naming ==
The first fossil material, a single skull missing much of its left side, was recovered in 1990 from the Sud Sadaco horizon of the Pisco Formation in Peru. Although initially thought to correlate with the earliest Pliocene, later studies have found that these sediments were deposited during the late Miocene, from the Tortonian to the Messinian stage (9.6 to 5.3 million years ago). This skull, designated USNM 460306 initially and later USNM 488252, was described by Christian de Muizon in 1993, establishing the genus Odobenocetops with O. peruvianus serving as the type species. Due to this genus' strange anatomy Muizon also coined the family Odobenocetopsidae. Several additional fragmentary fossils, namely periotic and tympanic bones, were later referred to the genus as well.

More substantial material was found in the form of three additional specimens, one of which is thought to represent a female O. peruvianus while the other two were described as a second, younger species named O. leptodon. The holotype specimen of O. leptodon is a nearly complete skull with the associated atlas, the topmost of the neck vertebrae. The other specimen of O. leptodon is a much less complete skull, badly weathered and missing the right tusk, but preserving an assortment of postcranial elements such as ribs, vertebrae and a partial forelimb. While the referred O. peruvianus skull was found in the SAS horizon like the type specimen, the new species stems from the SAO horizon, which is slightly younger.

In addition to these two species, more disarticulated remains of an indeterminate Odobenocetops species have been identified further south from the Bahia Inglesa Formation of Chile.

The generic name Odobenocetops comes from the Greek odon for "tooth", baino which means "walk", the Latin word cetus for "whale" and ops, "like". In combination the name means "cetacean that seems to walk on its teeth", a name chosen both to reflect the animal's potential feeding position as well as referring to the similarity with the extant walrus (Odobenus). The species name of O. peruvianus refers to Peru, the country it was found in.

== Description ==
=== Size ===
The body length has been estimated to range from 3–4 metres (9.8–13.1 ft). It is possible that Odobenocetops reached a mass similar to that of modern narwhals, between 800–1,000 kg (1,800–2,200 lb).

=== Skull ===
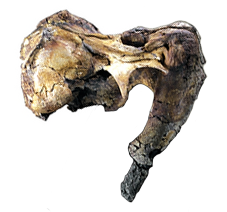
Holotype skull of O. peruvianus in right lateral view

The skull of O. peruvianus is large, measuring 46 cm (18 in) throughout its preserved length. The skull has a characteristic profile, appearing strongly concave between the elevated snout and skullroof. When viewed from above, it is also clearly separated into two large portions. The anterior most portion, which includes the premaxillae, tusks and nares is separated from the back of the head by a strong constriction, giving the skull somewhat of an hourglass-shape. The skulls of modern whales show a great variety of adaptations towards aquatic life, clearly setting them apart from all other mammals. Among these adaptations is what is commonly referred to as "telescoping", a term that generally describes the fact that bones typically far apart are very closely spaced in cetaceans and largely overlap.

However, Odobenocetops is unique due to how its skull appears to reverse the telescoped condition of the cetacean skull. This is achieved through the maxilla and frontal bones regressing towards the tip of the snout and the bony nares being moved forward. Subsequently, this gives the rostrum its characteristic short and round appearance, in contrast to the elongated skulls found in other cetaceans. Related to this the type species O. peruvianus is thought to have lacked a melon (an important sensory organ), or at the least only had a vestigial melon. The bony nares are now located near the tip of the skull, in contrast to the blowholes of whales and dolphins located on the top of the skull. In other odontocetes, parts of the frontal and maxillae cover the temporal fossae. In Odobenocetops, these bones are reduced and narrowed so that the temporal fossae are open dorsally. Additionally the parietal bones are well exposed dorsally, which corresponds with a well developed temporalis muscle. The periotic and tympanic bones are similar to those in other dolphins. The eye-sockets are oriented upwards and sideways, and not fully laterally like in other dolphins. The palate is arched, large and deep like in walruses and besides the two tusks in the premaxilla, Odobenocetops was toothless. The tip of the snout, specifically the premaxilla, is covered in important insertion points for facial musculature while also housing a great number of neurovascular foramina. This has been interpreted as supporting a strong upper lip and potentially even vibrissae similar to those in a walrus.

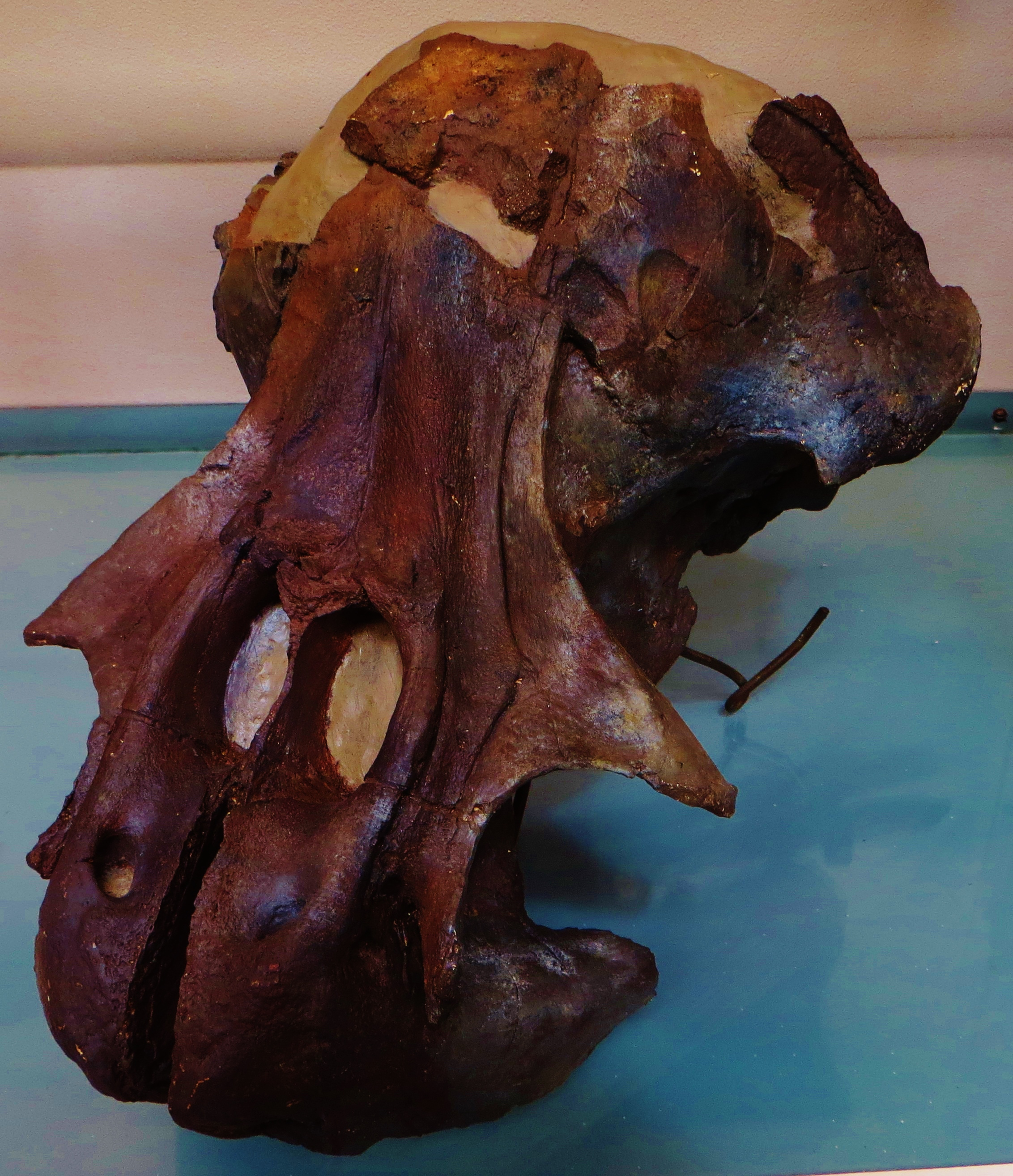
The skull of a female O. peruvianus showing the anterior position of the nares

The skull of O. leptodon differs from that of O. peruvianus in several ways. The palate is much deeper, longer and wider and the anterior border is curved more gently, giving it a U-shape rather than a V-shape as in O. peruvianus. The palate itself is also asymmetrical and was likely positioned parallel to the seafloor, but not at a right angle with the sagittal plane. The apex of the snout in general is more massive than in the type species and at the tip of the rostrum, between the premaxillae, there is a unique pair of supplementary bones not present in the older species at all. These bones, which may have been the rostral or prenasal bones, are similar to what is seen in mammals such as elephant shrews, moles, tapirs, saigas and pigs. A unifying factor of these groups is the presence of a strong upper lip, further supporting what was already inferred for O. peruvianus. The premaxillary foramina are missing in O. leptodon and a dorsal fossa (shallow depression) is present on the premaxilla. This fossa suggests the presence of a melon in O. leptodon, an organ either absent or strongly reduced in O. peruvianus. On the other hand, the orbit in O. leptodon has an anterior edge that is only slightly concave, whereas it is deeply notched in O. peruvianus which suggests that the binocular vision of O. leptodon wasn't as well-developed as in the older form. Although no mandibles are known for either species, it has been inferred that it was short and toothless based on the well developed pterygoid and temporalis muscles.

Like the rest of the skull, the periotic bone surrounding the inner ear is highly derived and does not closely resemble the typical anatomy expected from a cetacean. Still, the cochlear canal follows the general anatomy also present in its closest relatives the beluga and narwhal. The inner ear also has large semicircular canals, vestibular aqueduct and a large count of facial and vestibular nerve fibres. Other toothed whales have semicircular canals that are notably smaller than the cochlear canal. Again Odobenocetops most closely resembles the related beluga. It is possible that this correlates with increased mobility of the neck and head.

=== Tusks ===
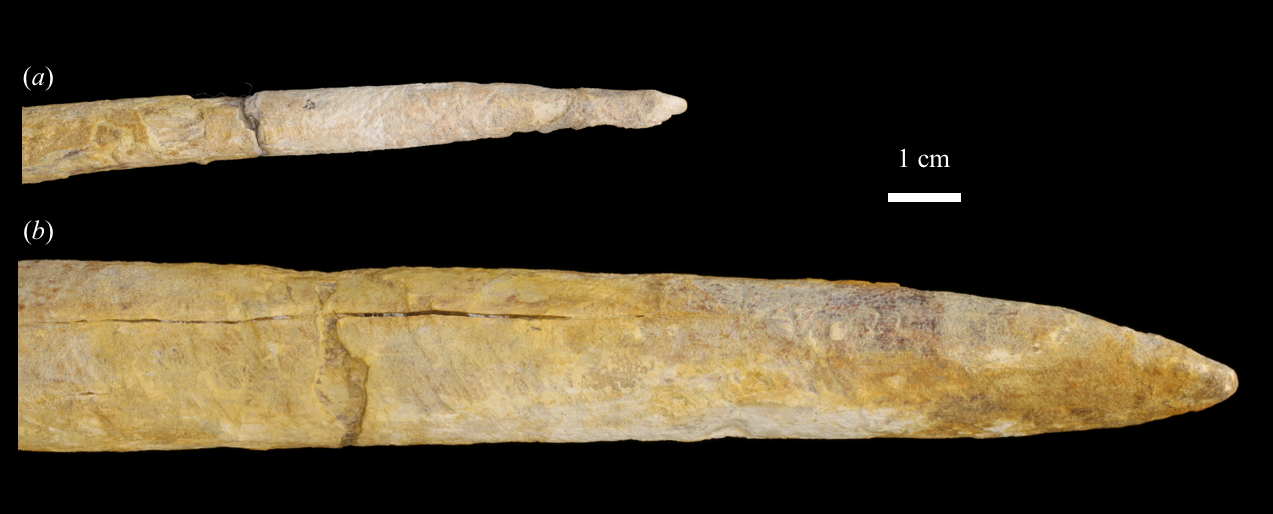
Odobenocetops sp. tusks from Cerro Ballena

In addition to the unique shape of the skull, Odobenocetops is most easily distinguished from other cetacean by the presence of a pair of asymmetric tusks composed entirely of dentine. These tusks are housed by large processes, known as the alveolar sheaths, formed by the premaxilla, which are directed back- and downwards at a 60° angle from the horizontal plane of the skull. Such a tusk is only known in a single other cetacean, the extant narwhal, in which they are also asymmetric. However, in narwhals the tusk is implanted in the left maxilla, whereas the tusk in Odobenocetops originates in the right premaxilla. The tusks in these two genera are therefore not homologous, and the occurrence of tusks in Odobenocetops is a convergence with narwhals. In the holotype of Odobenocetops peruvianus both tusks are incomplete. Based on the preserved elements it is estimated that the longer, right tusk measured between 45–55 cm (18–22 in) in length. The left tusk was notably smaller, being estimated at no more than 20 cm (7.9 in) long and possibly entirely contained in the premaxillary process. Following the discovery of O. leptodon, Muizon speculated that both tusks could have obtained larger sizes in other individuals. This however would require additional specimens to corroborate the hypothesis. The second skull, described by Muizon in 1999, differs significantly from the 1993 skull despite being found in the same horizon. Unlike the drastic size difference between the left and right tusk of the type specimen, the tusks of the second specimen were both mostly symmetrical and short. Rather than taking this as evidence for an additional species, Muizon suggests that this skull may have belonged to a female individual displaying sexual dimorphism. This is supported by the dimorphism seen in modern narwhals, in which only males possess the iconic tusk while most females lack them. The pulp cavity of the elongated tusk was 23 cm (9.1 in) long, indicating that it grew continuously. The short tusk also appeared to still be growing, even if at a much slower speed.

The holotype of the younger species O. leptodon was found with both tusks in situ, the right one was needle-like and 1.35 metres (4 ft 5 in) long, 1.07 metres (3 ft 6 in) of which being located outside of the premaxillary process, the left tusk was only 25 cm (9.8 in) long, similar in length to the small tusk of O. perivianus. Despite the small tusk only being slightly longer than that of the type species, the wear facet of it indicates that it was erupted and not confined within the bony process of the premaxilla. The larger tusk also preserves a clear wear facet at its tip, giving the apex of the tusk a strongly oblique shape due to how the tusk was used.

Given the tusks length and slenderness, it was likely very fragile, which is considered to be an argument against it being held at a 45° angle from the body. This is corroborated by the anatomy of the neck. The way the atlas and the occipital condyle articulate suggests that in neutral position, the neck would have been angled slightly downward, which inclines the tusk slightly upward into a position parallel to the rest of the body. Due to the fact that the tusk additionally projects slightly towards the side, Odobenocetops could lower its head even further than that without having its tooth get in the way of its front flippers. The atlas itself, like the skull, is asymmetrical, with a stronger left side to compensate for the enlarged tusk.

== Phylogeny ==
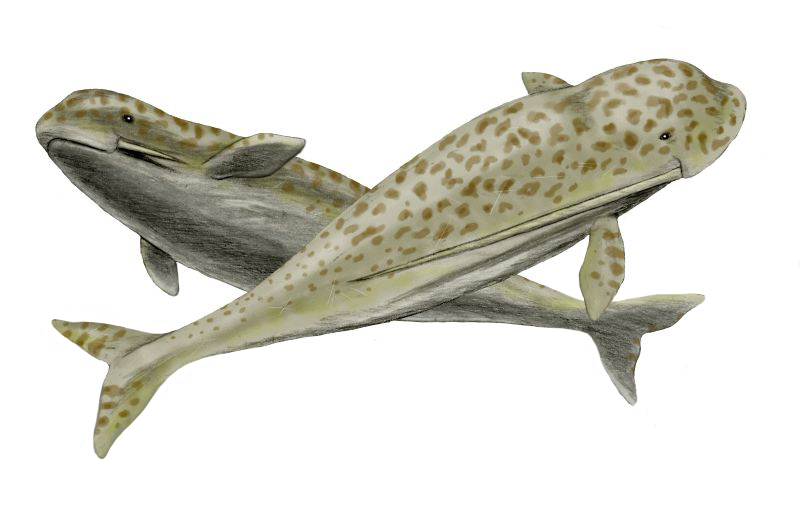
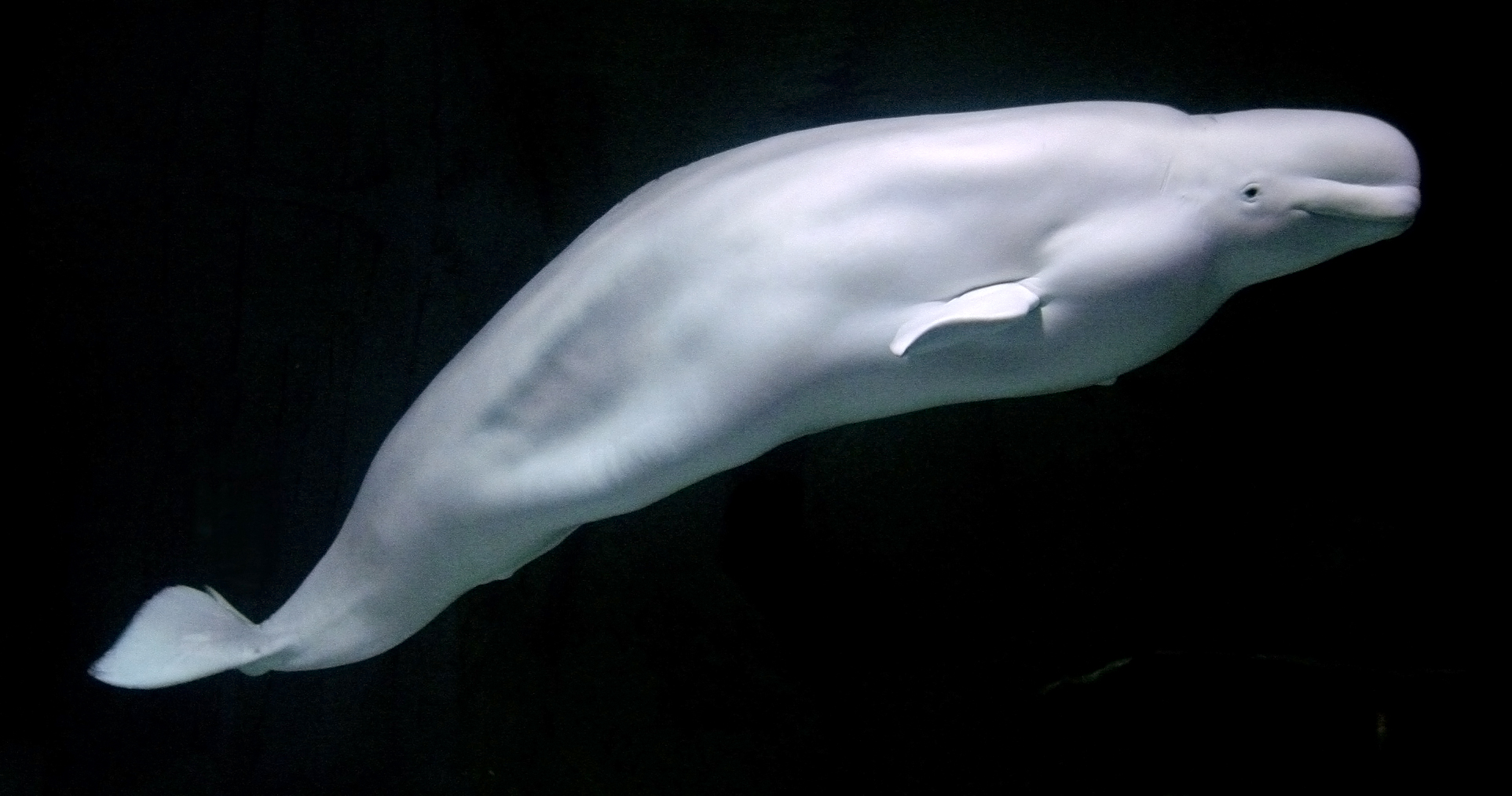
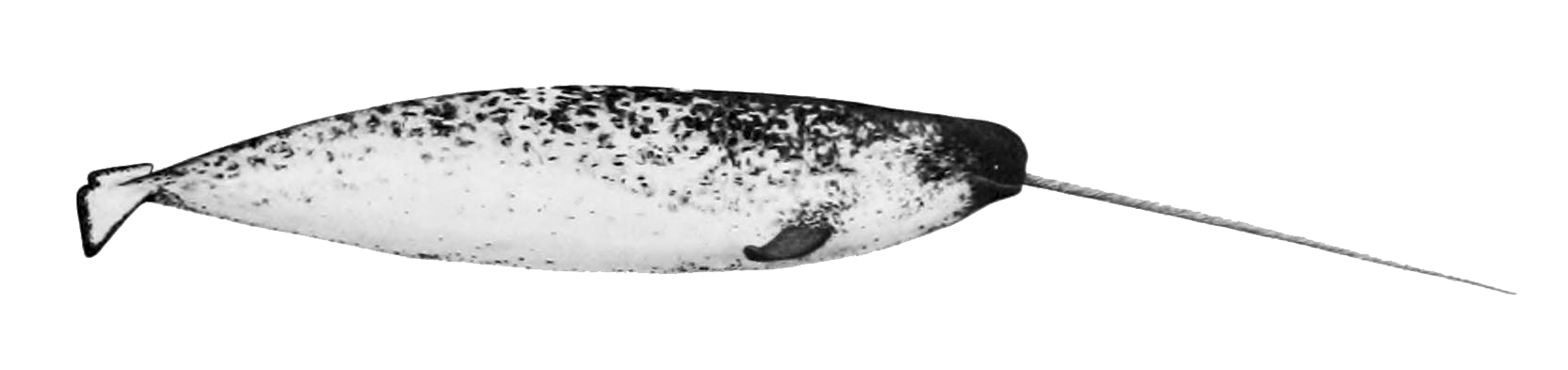
The closest living relatives of Odobenocetops are the beluga and the narwhal.

Odobenocetops was an early member of the dolphin superfamily, more closely related to narwhals than dolphins but with tusks projecting towards the rear of its body. Muizon placed Odobenocetopsidae as a sister group to the Monodontidae (the family including the narwhal and beluga whale). Murakami and colleagues placed Odobenocetopsidae in a large clade together with Phocoenidae (porpoises), Monodontidae, and Albireonidae (an extinct group similar to porpoises). This clade originated in the Pacific Ocean in the Langhian (15–13 ma) and diversified from there during the Serravallian and Tortonian (13–7 ma).

The relation between the two species may be that of sister taxa rather than successive species. Muizon points out that Odobenocetops leptodon clearly has a more derived palate than its older relative, yet retains the basal melon which is heavily reduced in O. peruvianus as a derived trait.. This suggests that they are two different branches of the same genus, rather than one species having evolved from the other. Despite their very limited range, no transitional form between Odobenocetops and other whales is known, leaving their precise origin a mystery.

- Delphinida
  - Lipotidae
  - - - "Pontoporiidae"
      - Iniidae
    - Delphinoidea
      - Hadrodelphis
      - - "Kentriodontidae"†
        - - Albireonidae†
          - - - Odobenocetops
              - Denebola†
              - Monodontidae
                - Delphinapterus leucas (Beluga whale)
                - Monodon monoceros (Narwhal)
            - Phocoenidae (Porpoises)
          - Delphinidae (Dolphines)

== Paleobiology ==
=== Senses ===
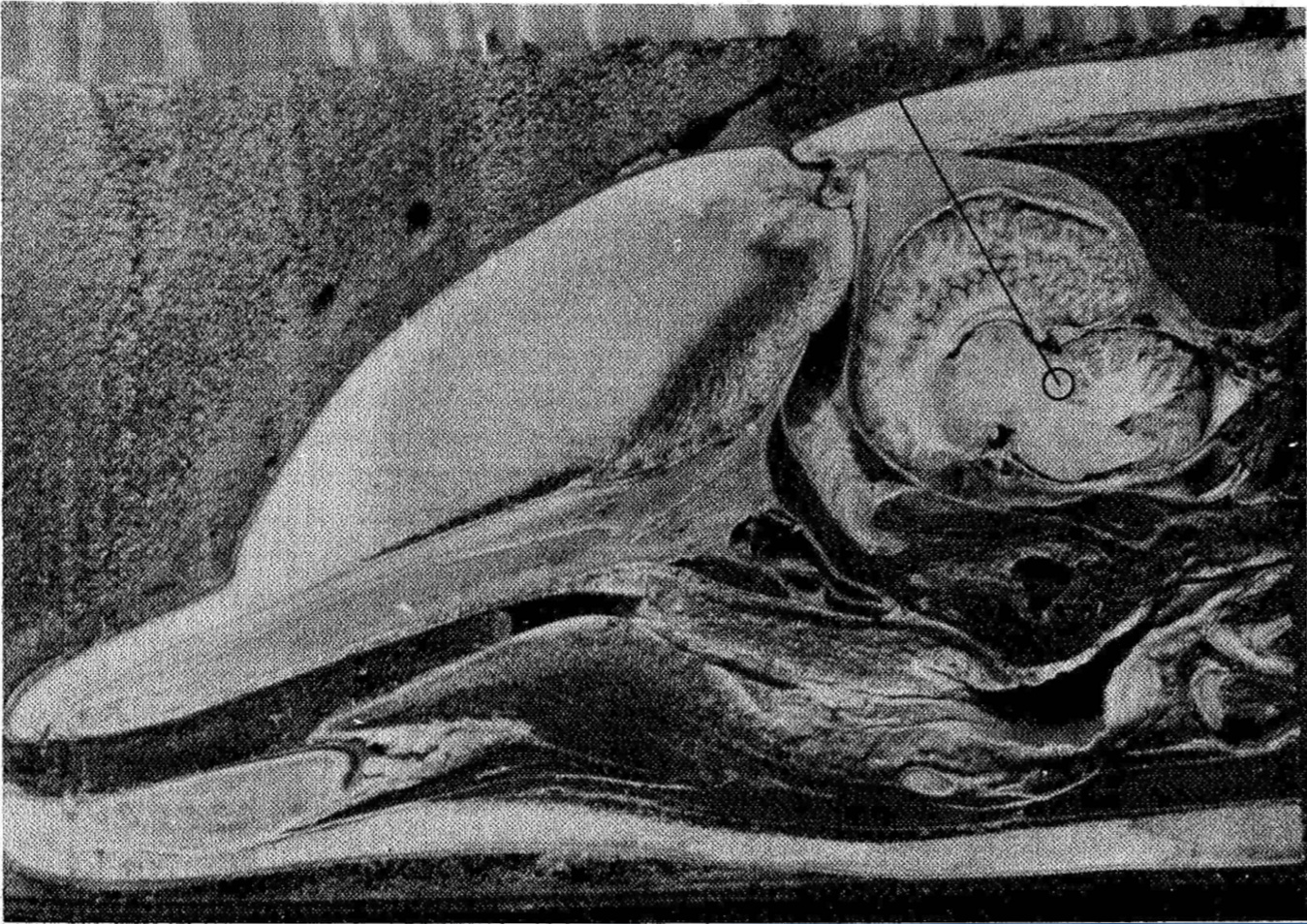
The bisected head of a dolphin. The melon is just above the upper jaw.

The melon, an important fatty sensory organ present towards the front of the head and associated with echolocation in toothed whales, appears to be either heavily reduced or entirely absent in Odobenocetops due to the highly specialised skull shape of the animal. The anatomy of the inner ear as seen in O. peruvianus indicates that Odobenocetops was capable of ultrasonic hearing. Specifically, the cochlear anatomy resembles that of belugas and narwhals, which generally allows for the peak perception of sounds below 80 kHz. The anatomy points towards Odobenocetops being at the lower end of this range, its peak sensitivity likely ranging from 35 to 50 kHz. Despite this, O. peruvianus displays a series of characters suggesting that it was generally less capable at producing sounds itself. This includes not just the absent melon, but also the lack or the reduction of premaxillary sacs, nasal plugs and the diverticula in the nasal passage. Furthermore, the extremely derived skull of Odobenocetops likely means that many of the nasolabialis muscles were reduced or entirely absent. Overall this suggests that Odobenocetops peruvianus was most likely incapable of producing the beamed, gated signals that define echolocation and could only passively listen to ultrasonic sound. While this could still provide valuable information about the animals surroundings, it is not nearly as complex as the biosonar seen in other toothed whales. However, Muizon suggests that this may not have been a hindrance to the animal and that if positioned oblique to the seafloor, the enlarged and dorsally located eyes of the whale may have provided good binocular vision. This would mean that while losing its biosonar, O. peruvianus instead developed much better vision to compensate for this.

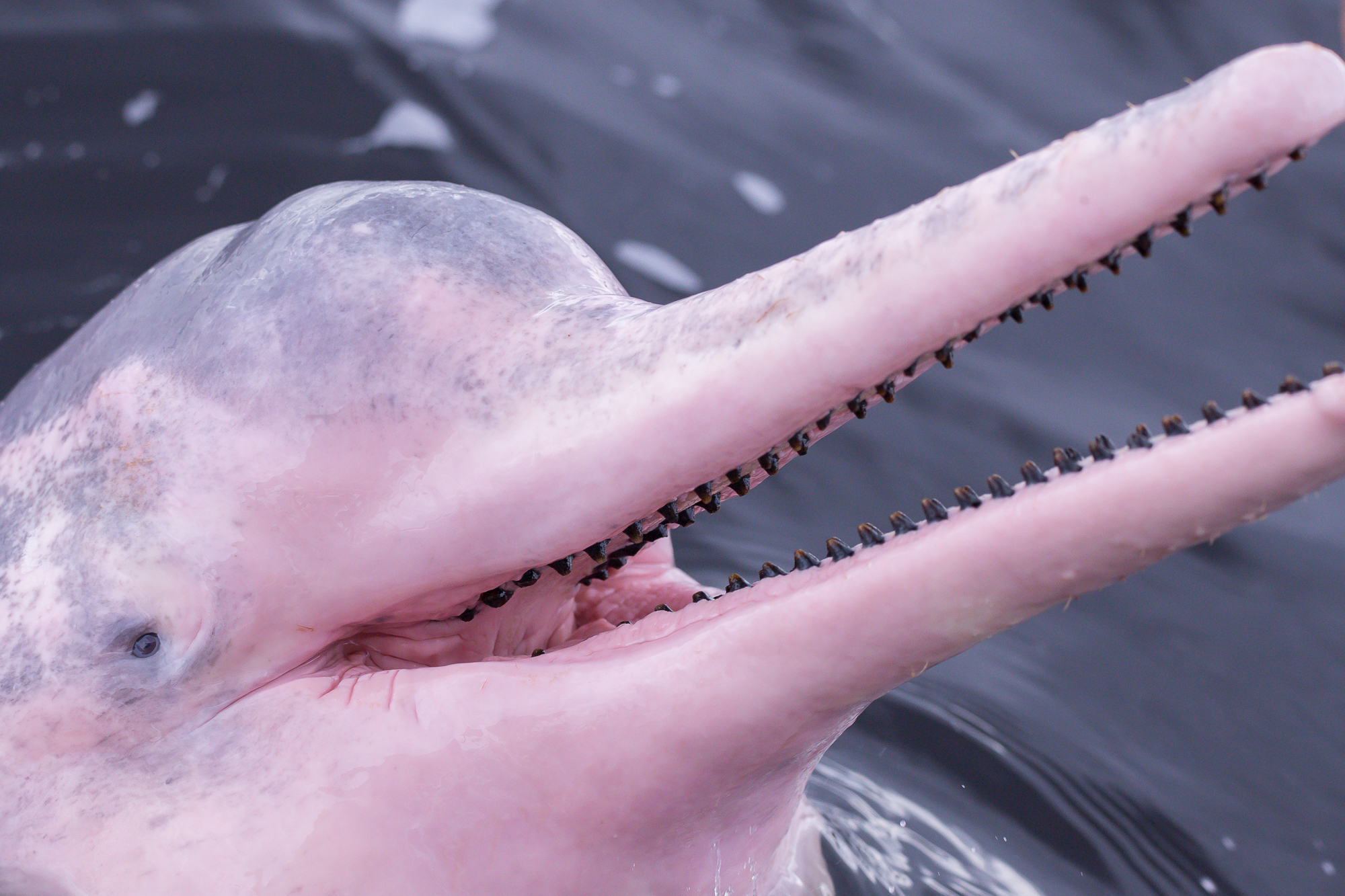
It is possible that Odobenocetops possessed tactile hair like the modern walrus or some cetaceans like the boto.

Odobenocetops leptodon differed significantly in this regard. The eyes were still oriented more dorsally, but the shape of the orbits does not support the idea that this species also had well developed binocular vision. The precise state of this species' vision is uncertain, but it may have ranged from only having reduced binocular vision to no binocular vision at all. Unlike the older species though, O. leptodon preserves small depressions on the premaxillae that indicate that the animal was equipped with premaxillary sacs. This would mean that although the melon is absent in the type species, it was at least somewhat developed in O. leptodon. Such a small melon would further be supported by the width of the apex of the rostrum. In O. peruvianus the rostrum is simply too narrow and tapering to have room for a melon. Regardless, even with a melon present in O. leptodon, this organ would still be reduced relative to other toothed whales.

All this suggests that the two species varied in their approach to foraging. O. peruvianus with its vestigial or non-existent melon relied on its vision, which was exceptionally well developed compared to that of other cetaceans. O. leptodon on the other hand appears to have had much poorer binocular vision if at all and instead possessed a small melon, likely hunting primarily through the use of echolocation.

Another sense Odobenocetops may have used was touch through the presence of vibrissae, sensitive hair as seen in the modern walrus and other seals, which Muizon speculates may have been present. The later discovery of small foramina along the sheaths of the tusks may correspond with this idea. However, the presence of fully formed vibrissae is not confirmed and would be a unique adaptation among toothed whales, as tactile hair are typically a vestigial structure in the group, only found in adult Amazon river dolphins, some mysticetes and the calves of a few other toothed whales. If they were present, they and the strong upper lip may have formed a structure similar to the rostral disc of the modern dugong.

=== Tusk function ===
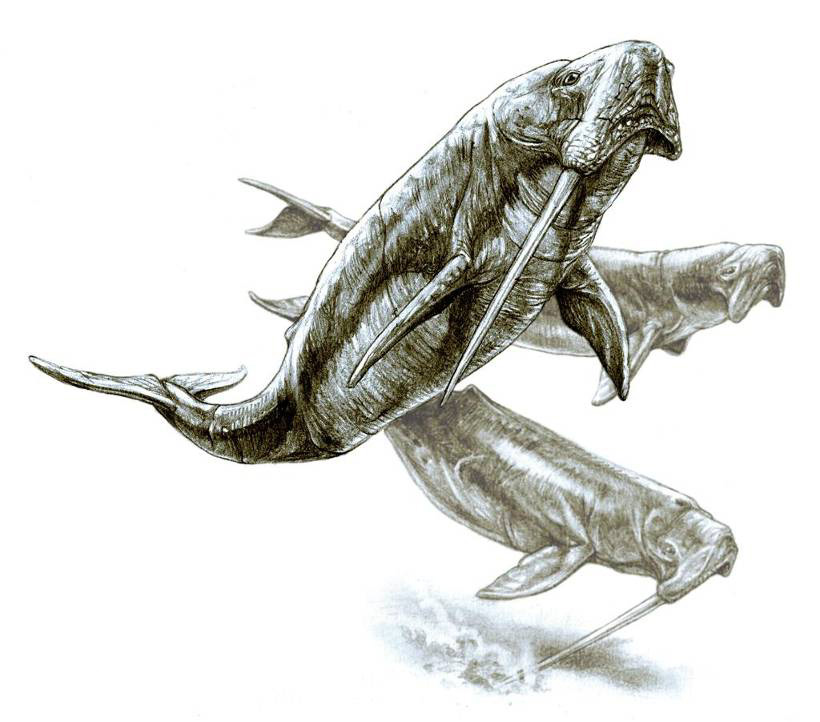
Life reconstruction of three Odobenocetops, with one of them using its tusk for orientation

Generally its length and slenderness both make it rather fragile, which is supported by the fact that the tooth of the holotype was broken while the animal was still alive. The function of the tusks themselves is not entirely clear. Initially, Muizon proposed that they were merely a social instrument and not used in foraging, a hypothesis favored by later discoveries. The fragile nature of the enlarged tusks indicates that they were not used in any ways that would require it to apply force, for instance digging or fighting. The idea that they were possibly used in a non-violent social way may explain why female individuals lacked these enlarged tusks. One way the tusks could have been used in such a fashion would to establish hierarchy without actually having to fight. However they might have still served some unknown role in feeding that wouldn't require the tusk to be endangered by breakage. Studies conducted on the second species shows that in O. leptodon, both tusks have noticeable wear facets. In the case of the enlarged right tusk, this facet runs parallel to the crest of the palate and the seafloor, indicating that the wear of the tooth may have been caused by it being dragged along the bottom of the ocean during foraging. Muizon and colleagues suggest that the tusks could have been held parallel to the seafloor, serving as a sort of orientation guide for the animal during foraging.

In 2002 Muizon and colleagues considered the function of the tusks in greater detail, writing on the pros and cons of various potential uses. Many of these proposed functions were however quickly dismissed due to their strange nature. The use as ballast or as a forceful feeding adaptation is considered unlikely due to their asymmetrical nature, nor would such a use be supported by modern relatives or analogues. Using the tusks for climbing on land is quickly dismissed due to how such behavior would be out of place for anything but the basalmost cetaceans, while any use that would involve sea ice (such as creating breathing holes) is dismissed due to the climate of the region, which is much too warm. The possibility that they are simply an evolutionary leftover is also discarded due to how such a trait would quickly be lost if it served no purpose. Again a social function appears to have been the most likely function even though the exact details of how they would be used remains mysterious. Muizon and colleagues argue that although the tusks were positioned in a way that would allow them to slash at the flanks of other individuals after approaching head on, their fragile nature seems to preclude the use in actual combat. Purely visual display would be more consistent with the strength of the structure, but is not favored by the orientation of the tusk and how it's only visible on one side. The very limited sample size only serves to deepen the mystery. Regardless of their function, Muizon and colleagues propose that they were a secondary sexual character that was subject of rapid sexual selection in a very narrow timeframe.

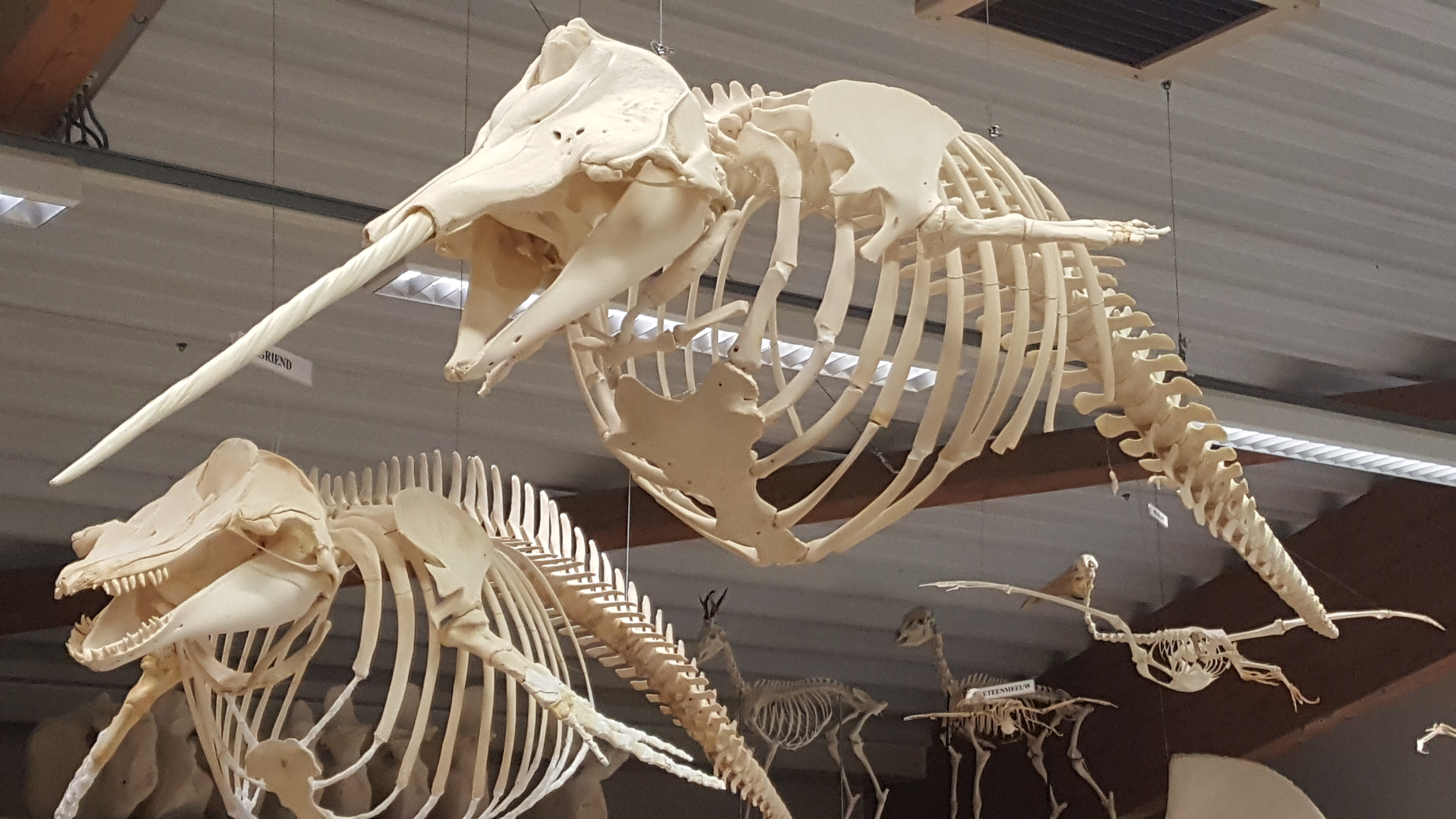
Although the teeth evolved independently in both animals, the tusk of Odobenocetops may have had a social function like that of the narwhal

The sheathes of the tusks themselves may have been an important feature in their own right. Muizon and colleagues speculate that they may have served as orientation guides and stabilizers to the mouth and the speculative set of vibrissae. Muizon compares this to the use of sled runners, especially relative to underwater photography, which keep the camera stable and pointed in the right direction. Their function is no less disputed than that of the tusks, even though the fact that they are nearly symmetrical and found in both sexes suggests that it was unrelated to sexually dimorphic behavior. The minor asymmetry is thought to be merely a compromise necessitated by the enlarged tusk. Regardless, the fact that they are of generally similar size indicates that they have a function beyond housing the tusks and were likely subject to their own selective pressure.

Their possible functions were explored in greater detail in the same publication as the tusks, again exploring different ideas and assessing the advantages and disadvantages. For instance, although their function to support the tusks seems natural, this would not explain why the sheaths are much more symmetrical despite only one of the two tusks being enlarged. Although Odobenocetops may have profited from the presence of hydrofoils, the sheaths are considered to be too small to serve this function effectively. Furthermore, hydrofoils might not have been very useful for the slow-swimming Odobenocetops, the sheaths would have generated little lift and if anything been counterproductive when the animal tried to feed and their stiff attachment to the skull makes them less effective than flippers. The sheaths are not dense enough to serve as ballast and are not angled correctly to form an effective plough during foraging (which would further clash with the interpretation that they might have been covered in tactile hair). They may not have been points for muscle attachment, as the back of the skull already serves this purpose, and they appear to have been overdeveloped for simply restricting the area affected by their suction force. They could have expanded the surface area for tactile hair, however only parts of the entire sheath contain the foramina used to infer these hair, whose presence is not confirmed to begin with. Although Muizon and colleagues find flaws with these last two hypothetical functions, they cannot rule them out entirely and suggest that they may even have been factors in the early evolution, before the length of the sheaths reached the size seen in the known fossils of Odobenocetops. It is possible that they could have also served social functions in display or combat, making the animal appear larger or serving as a shield against attacks. The idea that they are a retained primitive feature on the other hand is questioned as it does not explain what caused them to attain their size in the first place, as they likely didn't serve to support the tusks.

Two of the hypotheses regarding the function of the sheaths were however found to lack any direct evidence to the contrary. Skin attached to the sheaths could have been an adaptation for feeding, protected the eyes from mud and sediment, while the use as orientation guides is an idea Muizon had already suggested in previous publications. Although there may have been several possible advantages to the alveolar sheaths, most are thought to have been secondary and not the reason for their evolution. Instead, Muizon suggests that it was primarily the function as hydrofoils that caused Odobenocetops to develop these elongated structures.

=== Range of motion ===
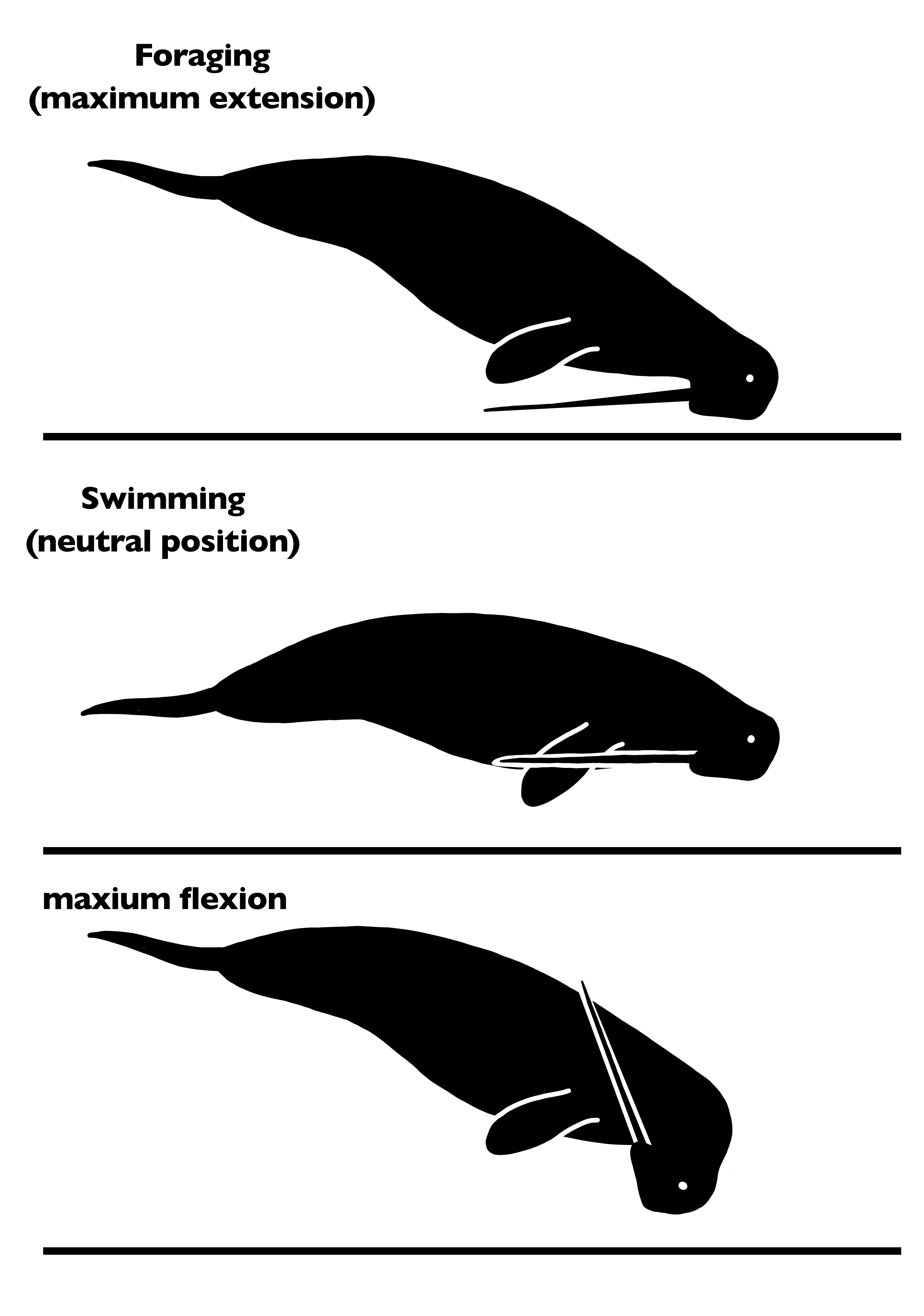
Different positions taken on by Odobenocetops leptodon.

Research conducted on the atlas of Odobenocetops suggests that the head, when held in its neutral position, would be positioned at a 133° angle relative to the axis of the body. This means that the tusk, which is angled downward relative to the skull, would be held in a raised position at a 13° angle relative to the torso. Due to the flexibility of the neck, Odobenocetops could have easily changed the angle at which it held its head, allowing it to change the position of the tusk as needed. Muizon and colleagues suggest that it may have angled its head down while swimming, which would effectively bring the tusk into a position roughly parallel with the rest of the body and reduce drag. When looking the anatomy of the occipital condyle these values change however. Here the tusk would diverge from the body at an angle of only 6°, running effectively parallel to the rest of the body. This difference may be caused by the difficulty in determining the neutral position between maximum flexion and maximum extension of the neck. Whichever the case, Odobenocetops shows pronounced points for muscle attachment on the basioccipital bone, which corroborates the presence of strong neck musculature that would be needed to compensate for the weight of the large tusks.

While the neck would flex to bring the tusks up while swimming, during foraging the densely built skull and tusk would keep the head down, essentially pulling the head to the seafloor while the buoyant body would be held oblique to the ground. In this position the neck would be hyperextended and the tusks may have been held at a 45° angle relative to the torso. Here too Odobenocetops shows clear convergence with the walrus. Muizon and colleagues contrast this to the position taken on by sirenians like the dugong, which are capable of swimming parallel to the seafloor thanks to their denser bonestructure relative to ceteaceans and pinnipeds. The hyperextension performed during feeding is the result of the incredibly mobile neck, which allows for a range of motion of up to 83°. This includes the hyperextension of 7° during feeding and hyperflexion of up to 90°. This far exceeds the 50° range of motion seen in the beluga whale, which is the odontocete with the greatest range of motion still living today. Further support for this can be found in the anatomy of the atlantooccipital joint. In accordance with this, Odobenocetops had a range of motion at least 29% greater than belugas.

While the hyperextension of the neck would be used in feeding, the precise purpose of the great possible range of flexion is not known. Regardless of purpose, such a position would have effectively allowed Odobenocetops to bring the tips of the tusks in a position above their origin without hindering the movement of the flippers due to the angle at which the tusks protrude outwards. The great range of motion estimated from the articulation of the bones is further supported by the numerous strongly developed muscle attachments seen on the skull of Odobenocetops.

=== Foraging and feeding ===
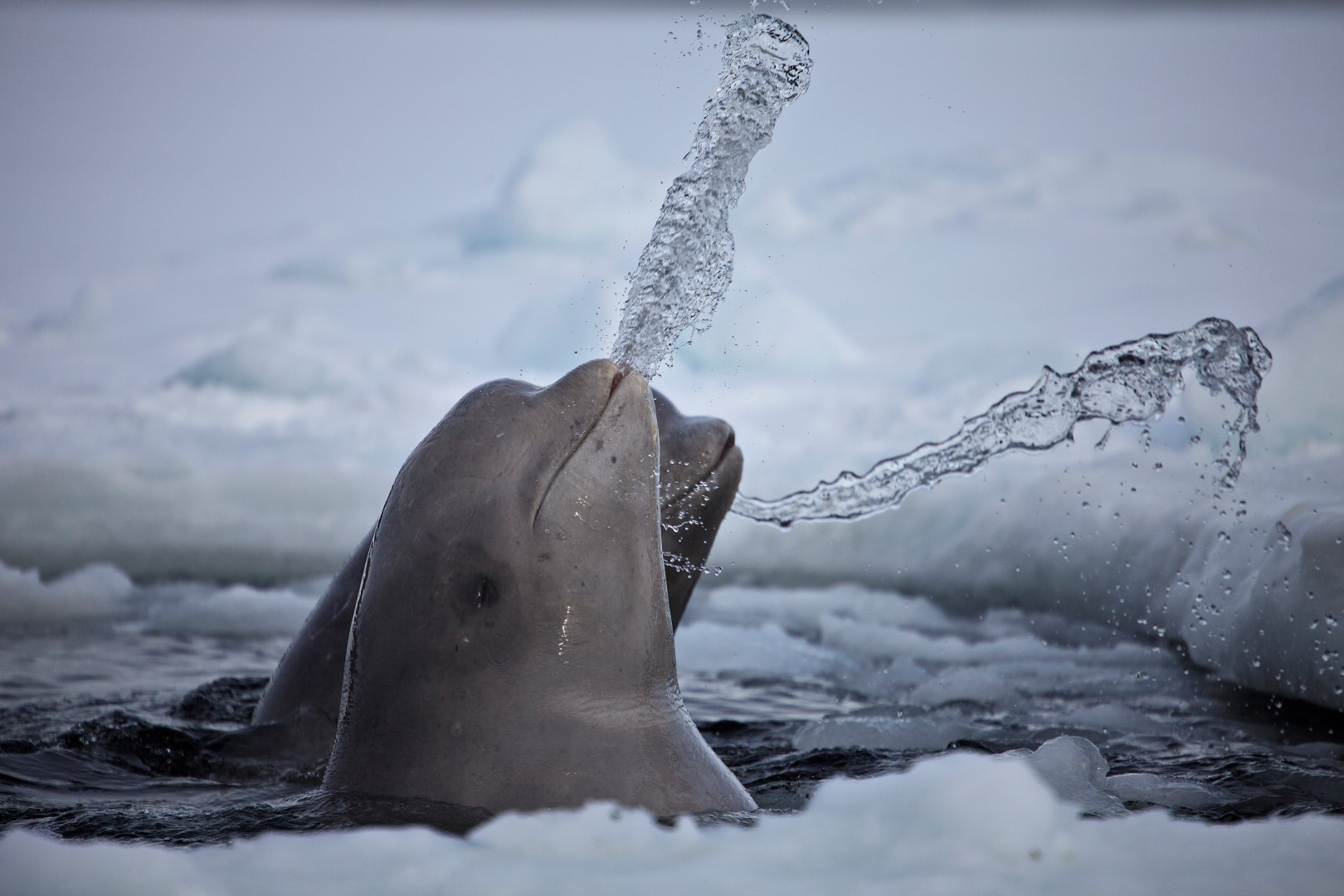
Belugas water jetting

In the morphology of the skull, Odobenocetops peruvianus shares many characteristics with the modern walrus. Due to this it is believed that the two animals, although unrelated, likely shared a very similar lifestyle. The deep palate, rounded snout supporting a strong upper lip, tusks and reduced dentition are all traits shared between this cetacean and walruses, both extant and extinct. The powerful musculature associated with the movement of the lower jaw in particular stands out. As the lower jaw was likely toothless, similar to the upper jaw, the strong musculature could not have functioned to allow for chewing and grinding. Instead the musculature is thought to have enabled Odobenocetops to suctionfeed. Like the walrus, Odobenocetops might have used its upper lip to grab various marine bivalves and sucked out the foot and siphon with the help of a large piston-like tongue. The entire mouth would essentially function like a vacuum pump. Such a feeding mechanism is further supported by the musculature connecting the upper and lower jaw. The glenoid fossa allows for forward and backward movement of the mandible while the temporalis muscle, masseter, tongue and throat musculature may have all contributed to moving the lower jaw back. The pterygoid muscles would have been responsible for forward movement. After having sucked out the soft parts of the bivalves it fed on, Odobenocetops could have simply ejected the remains of the shell. The same is also applicable to O. leptodon, although the modified and more pronounced anatomy of the palate may indicate that its ability to suck out molluscs was even greater than that of the older species. Regardless, both species are considered to be bottomfeeders like the modern walrus.

The asymmetrical palate was inclined more towards the left to compensate for the massive right tusk. Muizon and colleagues also mention the possibility that it was the other way around, and that the asymmetry wasn't responsible for the preference of the left side, but rather that this already established preference was responsible for the development of the tusk. A preference for one particular side is not unheard of in modern cetaceans, as bottlenose dolphins occasionally and gray whales consistently show a preference for feeding using their right side.

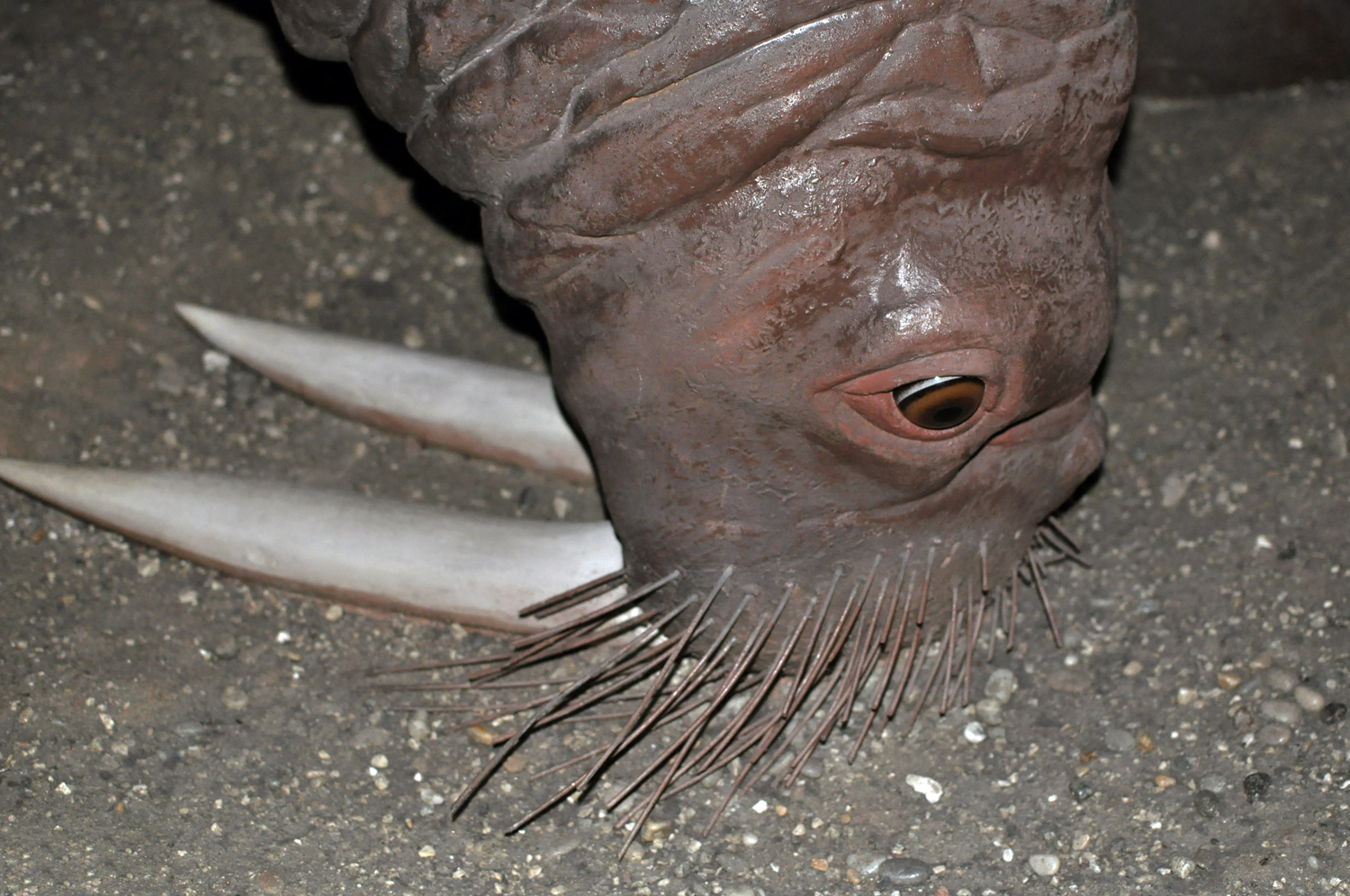
Odobenocetops likely foraged much like the modern walrus.

All this combined indicates that Odobenocetops was a bottomfeeding molluscivore, detecting various bivalves or crustaceans either through, depending on the species, the use of echolocation or exceptional vision and possibly with the assistance of tactile hair. While foraging the animal would keep its head down and the tusks parallel to the sediment while the rest of the body would be held oblique due to its greater density. The tail fluke would help keep this position while also providing propulsion, whereas the forelimbs may have been used as stabilizers. Once a suitable prey item was detected, Odobenocetops could have created a powerful jet of water using its mouth (an ability also seen in belugas and orcas), excavating the target from the sediment. It would then have likely used its powerful upper lip to grasp and hold the invertebrate in place before utilizing a complex suctionfeeding mechanism created by the palate and tongue to suck out the soft parts. Once these were out, the shell could be easily discarded.

== Paleoenvironment ==
Odobenocetops is mainly known from the Miocene Pisco Formation of Peru, which is thought to represent a coastal environment with calm, shallow waters. The rock units preserve a great cetacean diversity, including cetotheriids, rorquals, the pontoporiid Pliopontos, the beaked whale Ninoziphius as well as the porpoise Piscolithax and multiple sperm whales including the giant Livyatan. Other marine animals include the marine sloth Thalassocnus, the giant megalodon shark, two species of marine gharials, and various seals and penguins. Bivalves that could have served as prey to Odobenocetops have also been found in the area, including the genera Anadara, Trachycardium, Hybolophus, Panopea and Miltha.

Odobenocetops is also known from the Late Miocene-aged Cerro Ballena locality of the Bahía Inglesa Formation of Chile. It is composed of silty sandstones and sands that were deposited in a supratidal flat (flattened beach or berm zone). Contemporaneous vertebrates from this locality include the seal Acrophoca, balaenopterid and sperm whales, billfish, the shark Carcharodon, and the marine sloth Thalassocnus. Other faunal components include a variety of trace fossils left by invertebrates. These remains are found amid mass death assemblages comprising a variety of cetacean taxa, and likely owe to frequent harmful algal blooms.

== See also ==
- Evolution of cetaceans
