= Paleontological Museum of Caldera =

Chilean paleontological museum

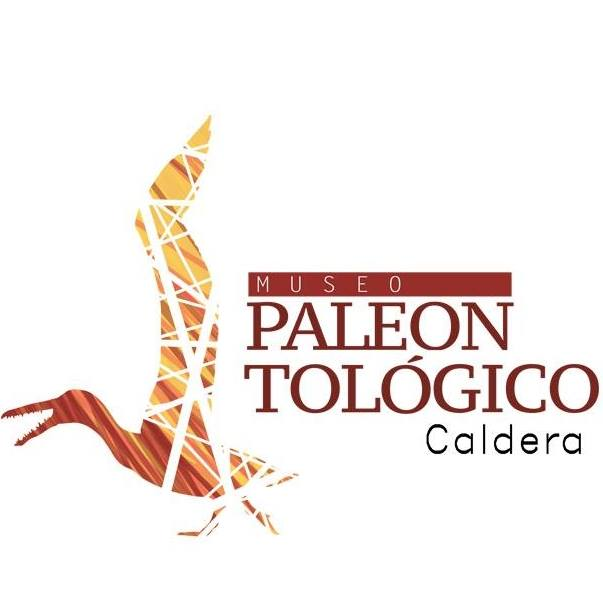

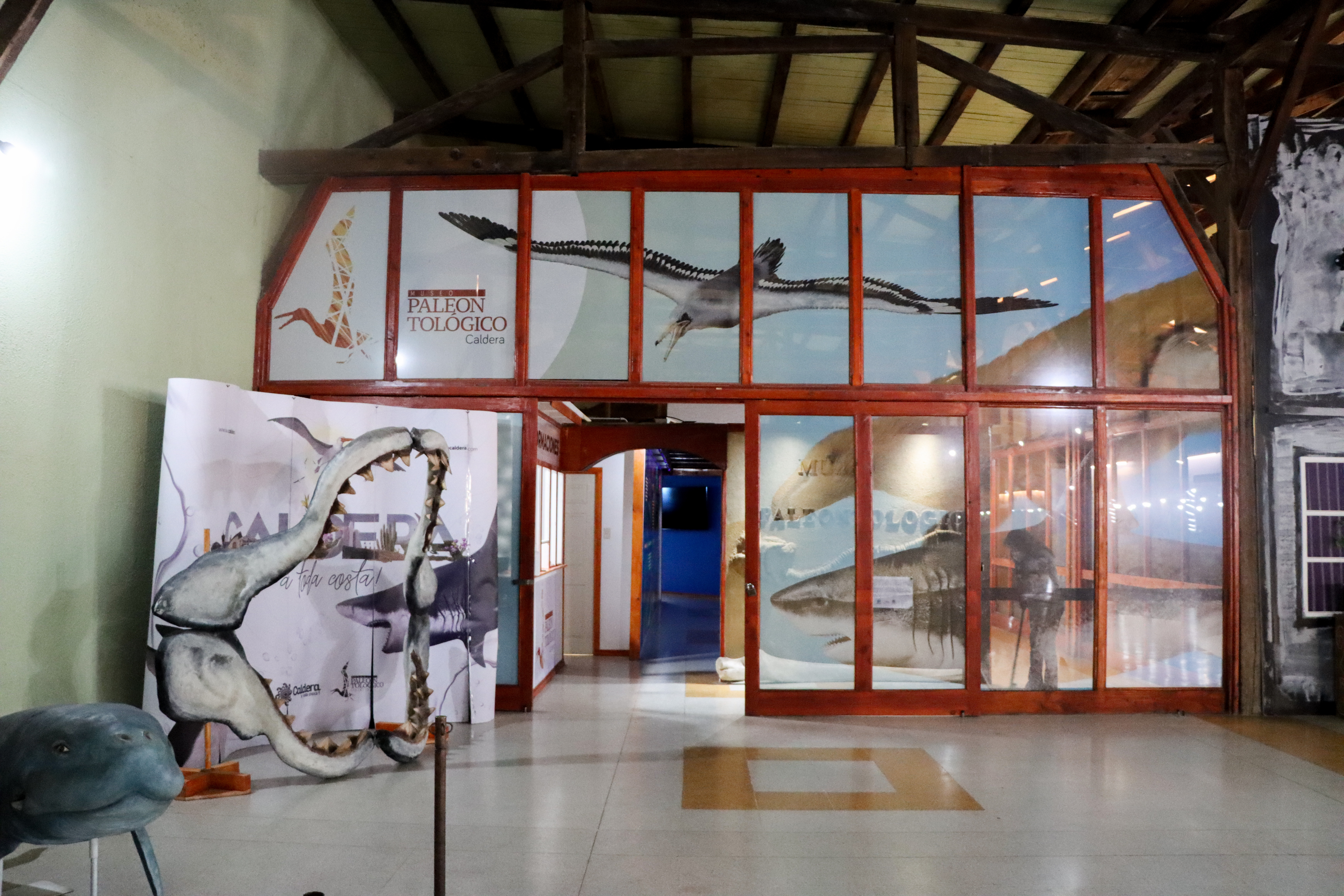
- Entrance to the museum, inside the Caldera station
- Established: September 21, 2006
- Location: Caldera station, Caldera, Chile
- Coordinates: 27°03′53″S 70°49′23″W
- Type: Natural history museum
- Collections: Neogene fossils
- Curator: Mario Suárez Palacios

The Paleontological Museum of Caldera (abbreviated MPC) is a natural history museum located in the commune of Caldera, Atacama Region, Chile. Since its establishment in 2006, it is dedicated to the protection and preservation of the fossil record of Caldera and related areas, including the nearby coasts, and has been instrumental in the conservation of remains from emblematic fossiliferous localities of the Bahía Inglesa Formation (Miocene-Pliocene), such as Cerro Ballena or Los Dedos Paleontological Park. The museum was erected inside the cultural station of Caldera, where it offers public access to the most significant collections.
