= Caldera Basin =

Geological feature in Chile

- Cuenca de Caldera
- Location within Chile
- Coordinates: 27°11′50″S 70°45′30″W
- Etymology: Caldera
- Region: Atacama Region
- Country: Chile
- State: Copiapó
- Cities: Caldera

Characteristics
- On/Offshore: Onshore
- Boundaries: Pacific Ocean, Chilean Coast Range

Hydrology
- River: Copiapó

Geology
- Plate: South American
- Orogeny: Andean
- Age: Early Miocene-recent
- Stratigraphy: Stratigraphy

Caldera Basin (Spanish: Cuenca de Caldera) is a sedimentary basin located in the coast of northern Chile west of Copiapó. The basin has a fill of marine sediments of Late Cenozoic age. With a north–south extension of 43 kilometres (27 mi) and an east–west width of 20 kilometres (12 mi) the basin occupies an area between the coast and the Chilean Coast Range and between the port of Caldera and the mouth of Copiapó River. The sedimentary fill rests on metamorphic rocks of Paleozoic age and on plutonic rocks of Mesozoic age.

== Stratigraphy ==
The following units make up the sedimentary fill
Name		Age	Lithologies	Depositional environment
Caldera Beds		Pleistocene		
Bahía Inglesa Formation	Quebrada Blanca	Late Miocene	Conglomerate, sandstone, biocalcirudite	Shoreface, outer shelf, tsunami
Bahía Inglesa Formation	Rocas Negras	Late Miocene	Calcirudite, biocalciarenite	Shoreface
Bahía Inglesa Formation	Mina Fosforita	Late Miocene	Sandstone, siltstone, shale	Uppermost continental slope, shoreface
Bahía Inglesa Formation	Chorrillos	Late Miocene	Clast-supported conglomerate	Submarine canyon debris flow fill, formed possibly by a tsunami
Bahía Inglesa Formation	La Higera	Late Miocene	Shale with gypsum veins, sandstone, siltstone, diatomaceous clay	Outer shelf or uppermost continental slope
Bahía Inglesa Formation	Cerro Ballena	Late Miocene	Silty sandstone	Supratidal flat
Bahía Inglesa Formation	Punta Totoral	Late Miocene	Biocalcarenite, biocalcirudite, matrix-supported conglomerate	Rapid sea-level oscillations
Bahía Inglesa Formation	Puerto Viejo	Late Miocene	Sandstone, siltstone, claystone, shale, microcoquina	Shoreface, marine transgression
Bahía Inglesa Formation	El Pimiento	Late Miocene	Biocalcarenite, quartzarenite	Shoreface
Angostura Formation		Early to Mid-Miocene	Matrix-supported conglomerate	High-energy river mouth
