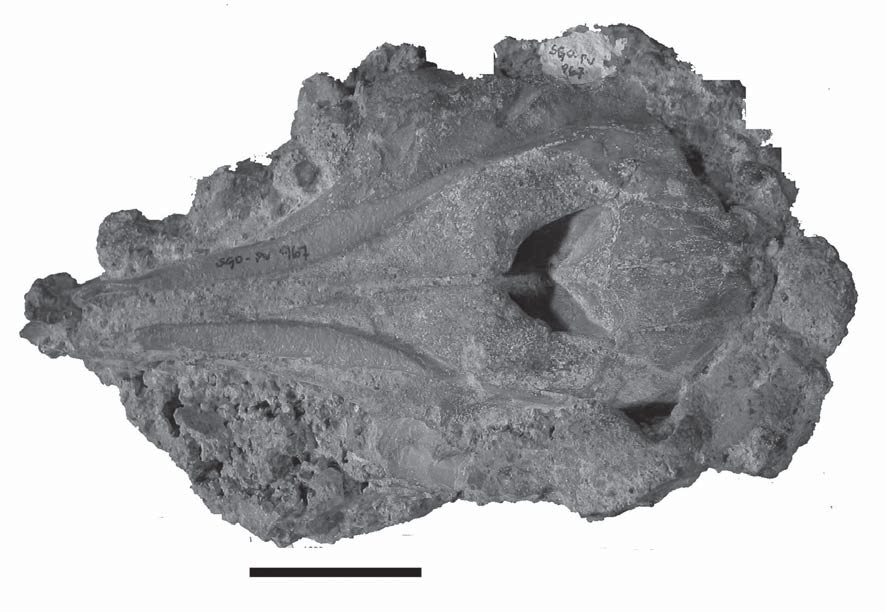
- Skull specimen SGO.PV.967, from Bahía Inglesa Formation

Scientific classification
- Domain: Eukaryota
- Kingdom: Animalia
- Phylum: Chordata
- Class: Mammalia
- Order: Artiodactyla
- Infraorder: Cetacea
- Superfamily: Inioidea
- Family: Pontoporiidae
- Genus: †Pliopontos; De Muizon, 1983

Type species
- †Pliopontos littoralis De Muizon, 1983

= Pliopontos =

Pliopontos Temporal range: Miocene-Pliocene

Extinct genus of mammals

Pliopontos is a genus of river dolphins that lived during the Miocene-Pliocene epochs in what are now the coasts of Chile and Peru. It contains a single species, Pliopontos littoralis, described in 1983 and known from the highly fossiliferous Pisco Formation. Additional remains attributable to the genus have been found in the Bahía Inglesa Formation and Coquimbo Formation.

== See also ==
- Evolution of cetaceans
- Pontoporia
