= Cerro Ballena =

Miocene palaeontological locality in Chile

- Stratigraphic range: Late Miocene, ~8.4 Ma
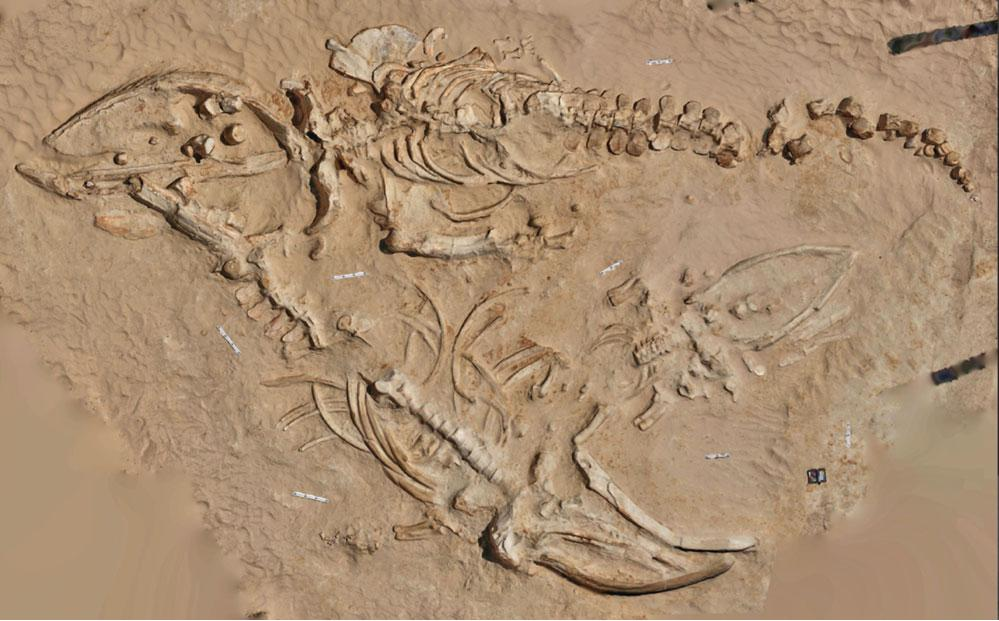
- Adult and juvenile balaenopterid whale mass mortality nicknamed "La Familia"
- Type: Locality
- Unit of: Cerro Ballena Member (Bahía Inglesa Formation)
- Thickness: ~9 m (30 ft)

Lithology
- Primary: Sandstone
- Other: Sand, silt

Location
- Coordinates: 27.042385°S 70.795255°W
- Region: Caldera Basin
- Country: Chile

Cerro Ballena (meaning "Whale Hill") is a fossiliferous locality of the Bahía Inglesa Formation, located in the Atacama Desert along the Pan-American Highway a few kilometers north of the port of Caldera, Chile. It has been dated back to the Late Miocene epoch, during the Neogene period. The locality was first noted in 1965 during military work and fully excavated and studied between 2011 and 2012, and is protected by law since the latter year.

Cerro Ballena is extremely abundant in cetacean fossil skeletons, including over 40 individuals of adult and juvenile ages. This high concentration of cetacean skeletons has made Cerro Ballena well known, now considered a national treasure of Chile. Besides cetaceans the site does also contains fossils of pinnipeds (seals), sailfish, sharks, swordfish, aquatic sloths (not a group as such, but rather the genus Thalassocnus) and invertebrate trace fossils.

The unusual concentration of cetacean remains and other marine vertebrates is explained to have occurred due to poisoning by toxins secreted by algae (events also known as harmful algal bloom). Geological and paleontological evidence indicates that high levels of iron in the sea saturated the growth of algae. Cetaceans and other vertebrates became poisoned, and their carcasses then floated towards the coastline, where they were later transported by strong waves into a flattened berm/shore, and finally becoming buried. This sequence of events happened four times during the deposition of sediments at Cerro Ballena.

== History and excavation ==
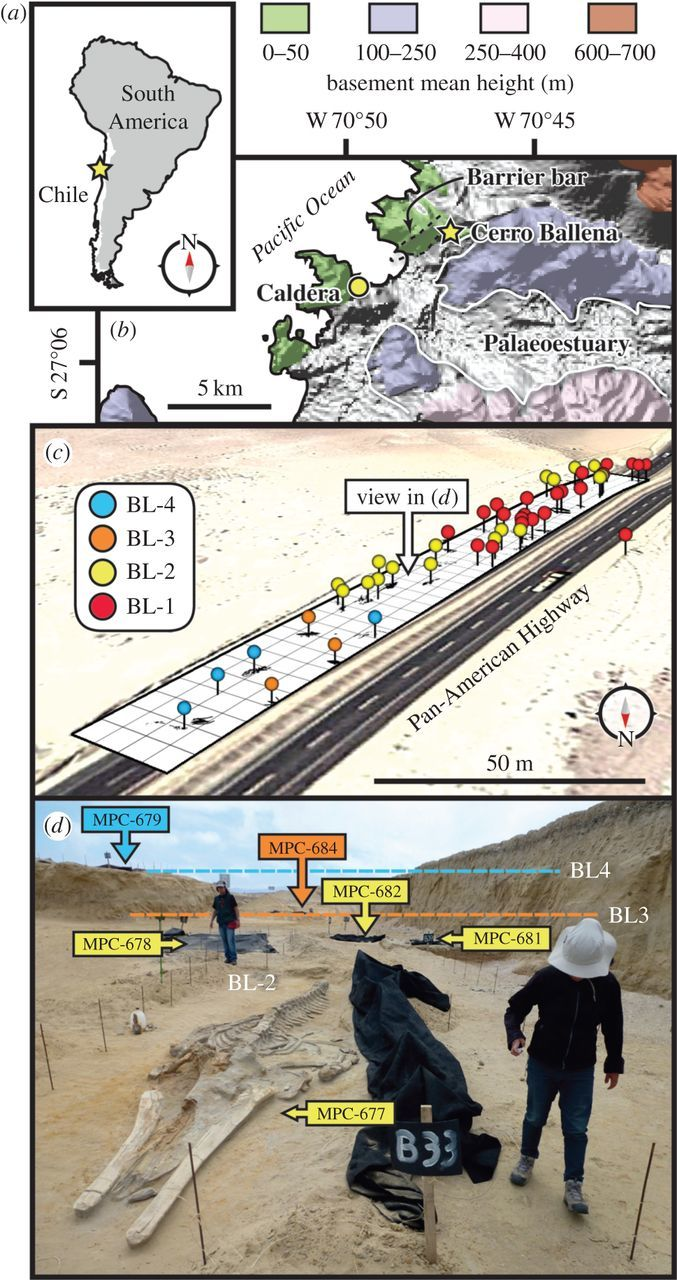
Location context of Cerro Ballena

The excavation and documentation of Cerro Ballena has had a rather convoluted and slow progression. Whale fossils from the area have been in knowledge since 1965, some of which were identified during the expansion of the Route 5 (which is part of the Pan-American Highway) at the hands of the Chilean Army. The presence of such remains in this area led to the locals and citizens of the nearby Caldera city to nickname the locality as "Cerro Ballena". The fossil material in question was never formally reported and its influence vanished for over 40 years. Later on, a large-scale project with the aim to connect both Caldera and Vallenar cities of Chile started to operate in this region. While this project considered archeological, faunal, floral, and landscape implications, paleontological research was not included, and thus, the prospecting and preservation of potential fossil findings was not given attention. The advancing progress of the highway work started to intercept with fossil outcrops, most notably at Cerro Ballena.

Paleontologist and curator of the Paleontological Museum of Caldera (MPC), Mario Suárez Palacios, noted the importance and impact of the situation and together with the director of Atacama Regional Museum requested a meeting with the at-the-time governor of Atacama. Upon this meeting, studies and measures were performed to temporarily stop the highway progress at the locality in coordination with the Ministry of Public Works, which allowed the National Monuments Council (CMN) of Chile to intervene and protect the fossils. Although the fossil remains were secured by laws and ready to get unearthed, the unprecedented high concentration of nearly complete whale skeletons (over 30 individuals) difficulted the speed and efficiency of paleontological research, and by extent halted the progress on the highway expansion.

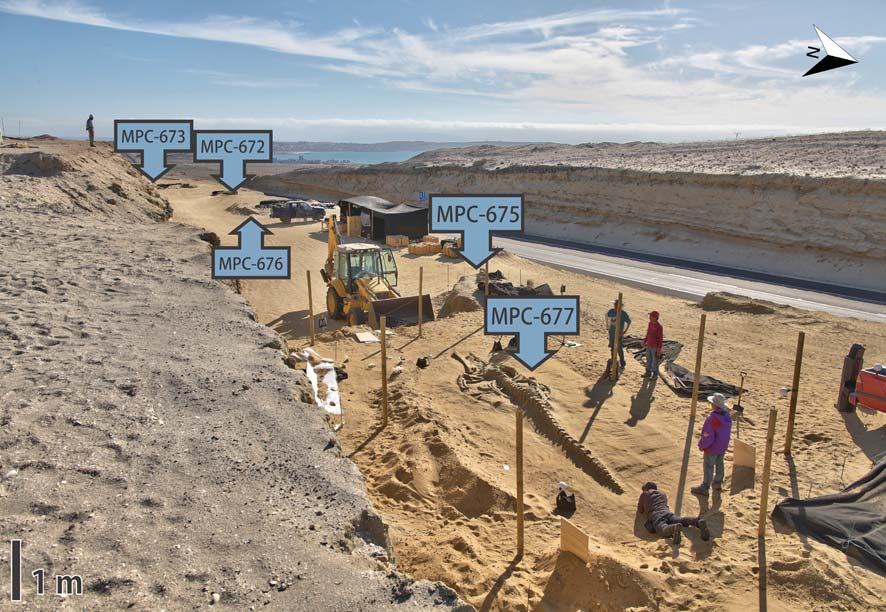
Multiple whale specimens from Cerro Ballena being excavated, along the Pan-American Highway

Suárez with his team became aware of this and reached out to other institutions for support, such as the Chilean National Museum of Natural History (located in Santiago) and the Smithsonian Institution of United States. As such, Cerro Ballena began to become very noticeable in both national and global contexts, and numerous institutions from Chile joined efforts to drive progress at the locality excavation. As a whole, excavation work was carried out between 2010 and 2012, discovering an extremely abundant concentration of whale fossils, proclaiming Cerro Ballena as the largest whale fossil site in Chile. With authorization of the CMN, documentation and agreements with the Smithsonian Institution were conducted so skeletons could be prepared in their museums, further speeding up the research at Cerro Ballena.

As a fruitful result of the extensive excavations and fieldwork by researchers over the years, the collected geological and paleontological data from the site was finally published in 2014 in a publication led by North American paleontologist Nicholas D. Pyenson and colleagues from Chile. The published research revealed that not only whale fossils were abundant at Cerro Ballena, but also fish, seals, ground sloths, and trace fossils, as well as giving insight into the taphonomic history of the fossil preservation at the locality.

== Geology and age ==
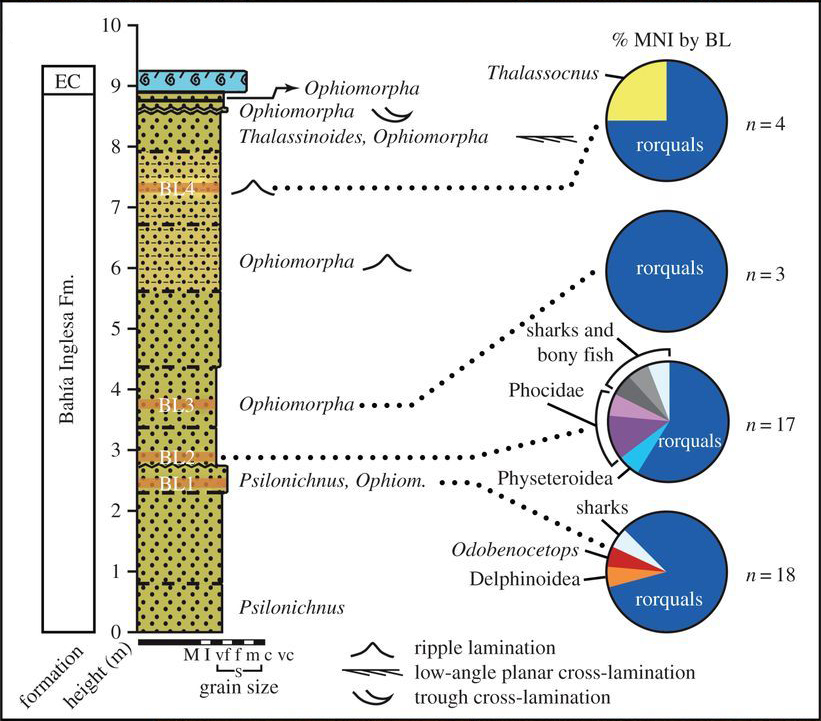
Stratigraphic and sedimentological column from Cerro Ballena

Cerro Ballena comprises a 20 m × 250 m (66 ft × 820 ft) quarry extending along the Pan-American Highway, though aerial maps indicate a larger extent of nearly 2 km (6,600 ft). The locality is about 9 m (30 ft) in thickness, composed of stratified fine to very fine-grained silty sandstones and sands that are assigned to the Bahía Inglesa Formation. About four fossil "levels" are recorded within the first 8 m (26 ft) of Cerro Ballena. Stratigraphically, the succession of Cerro Ballena is overlain by the younger deposits of Estratos de Caldera. Compared to other localities and stratigraphic members of the Bahía Inglesa Formation, the quarry is located too far north for reliable age correlations. However, even though no radiometric analysis has been performed at Cerro Ballena, its fossil content has been used to estimate the relative geological age of the site.

Fossil taxa like Thalassocnus natans and Carcharodon hastalis are reported from Cerro Ballena and are also known to occur in the Miocene-Pliocene Pisco Formation of Peru, which is similar to Cerro Ballena in sedimentation. Specifically, these taxa are correlated with El Jahuay and Montemar Horizon localities of the Peruvian Sacaco Basin, thus placing the age of Cerro Ballena between 9.03 million and 6.45 million years old (roughly Late Miocene). Because of the geology of Cerro Ballena, it has been assigned its own member, the Cerro Ballena Member. In this context, it is suggested that this member is somewhat equivalent in age to La Higuera and Mina Fosforita members of the Bahía Inglesa Formation, though its depositional environment is mostly similar to that of the Punta Totoral Member. As such, Cerro Ballena is considered to be slightly older than La Higuera Member, around 8.4 million years.

== Depositional environment ==
Sediments and fossils of Cerro Ballena were deposited in a marine supratidal flat (flattened berm/shore or beach) during rise in sea-levels caused by transgressive–regressive cycling and tectonic subsidence along this part of the coastline. Based on comparisons with other marine depositional environments, it is estimated that the Cerro Ballena succession was deposited during a period roughly between ~16000–10000 years. It is unlikely that the deposition rate of this locality was regressively eroded or interrupted given the rise in sea-level suggested by the stratigraphy and age correlation with transgressive south beds. In addition, low-angle planar cross-lamination at the top of the Cerro Ballena succession indicates that a beach paleoenvironment existed. This lamination most likely formed on a barrier bar that protected the supratidal flat from the open ocean to the west, ultimately preserving the fossil content.

=== Taphonomy ===
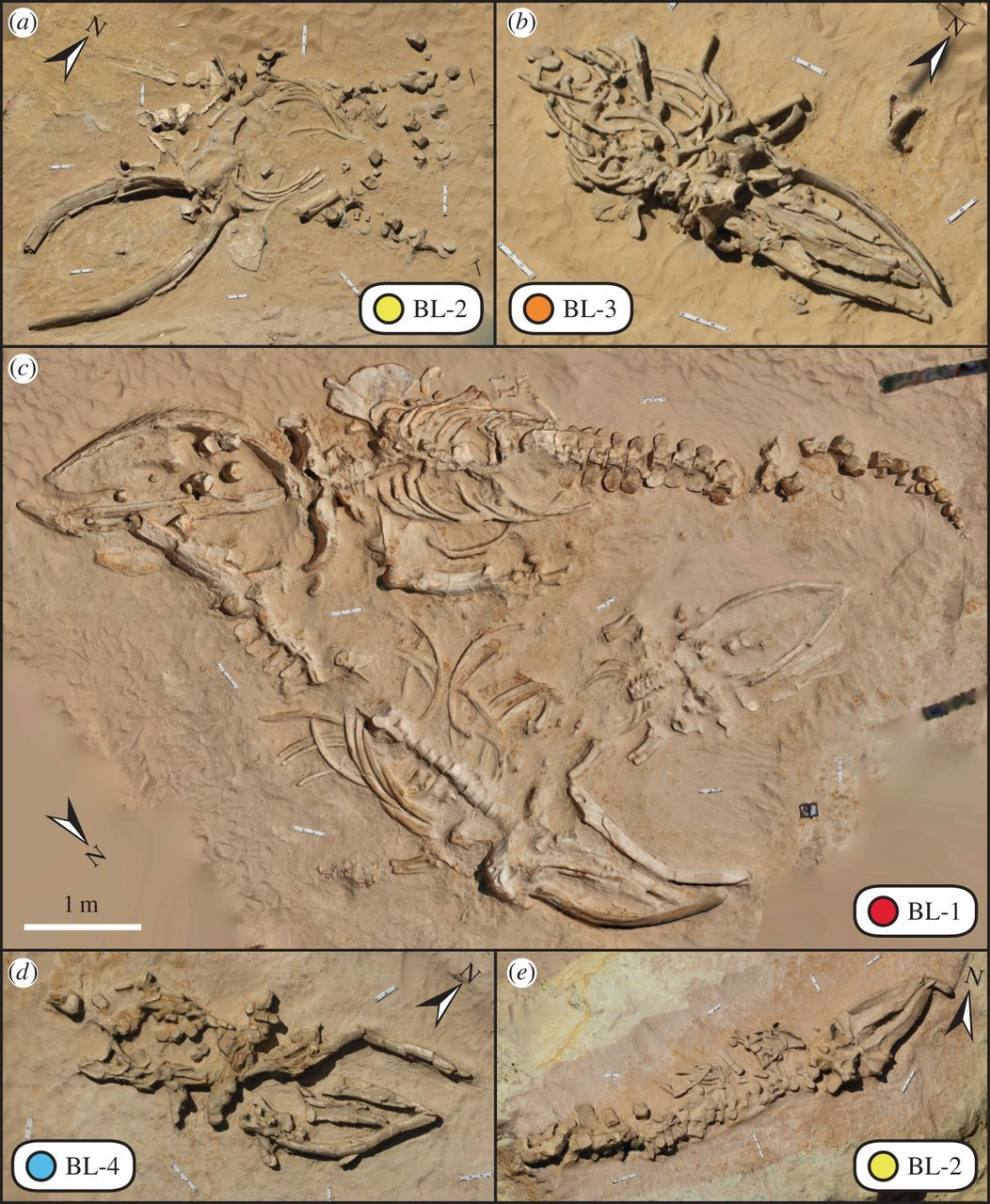
Multiple balaenopterid whale specimen occurrences from Cerro Ballena which are thought to have died due to toxic algae

Cerro Ballena is exceptionally abundant in cetacean fossils (especially skeletons), which are dominant in all four fossil levels. The high concentration of cetacean skeletons is similar to modern-day mass-mortality stranding events, characterized by beachcasted individuals. The fact that whale skeletons are found across all fossil levels indicates that at least four mass-mortality episodes occurred at this locality. Although many could be the reasons for these strandings, most are likely to occur due to saxitoxins consumed by vertebrates (released during harmful algal blooms; HABs).

At Cerro Ballena, several iron-stained domal structures can be found in the strata, which are attributed to algae growth traces. Given that the reported algae domal structures are rich in iron oxide replacement, it is concluded that a high concentration of iron was present at the mass-mortality events, which by extent saturated the growth of algae in the sea environment. Toxins would have been later consumed by marine vertebrates of this region. The close proximity of both juvenile-adult cetacean and other vertebrates (thus, multispecific) fossils strongly reinforces the interpretation that assemblages died from a common cause.

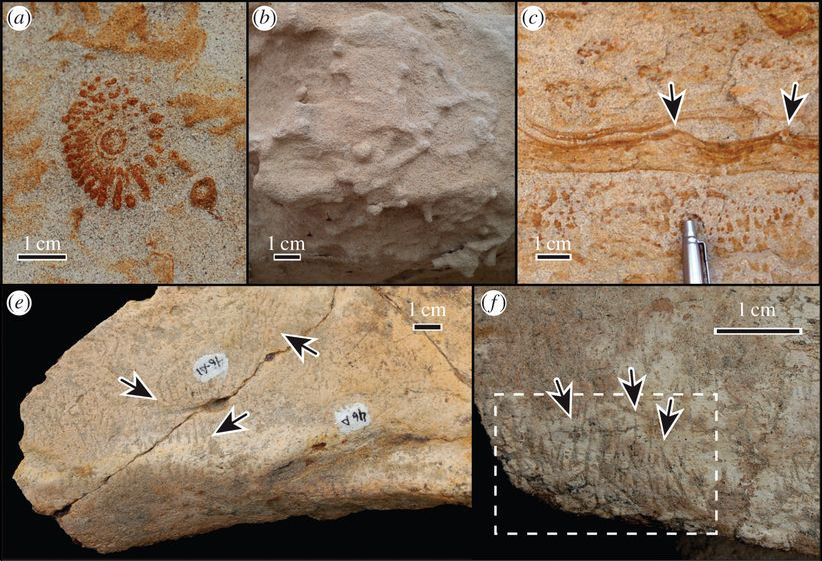
Ichnotaxa from Cerro Ballena, including traces attributed to algae structures and crab feeding

Floating vertebrate corpses located in the shoreline were later transported to the supratidal flat by high-energy storm waves, and protected from other sea waves by surrounding geological barriers and basement rocks. The supratidal flat allowed carcasses to decay in a paleoenvironment free from scavengers and climatic hazards. Fine grained sediments eventually buried the skeletons. As reflected by four fossil-bearing levels at Cerro Ballena, these HABs and mass-mortality events repeated at least in four rapid instances, thus preserving an exceptional concentration of marine vertebrate fossils.

Because of the relative articulation and completeness of cetacean skeletons compared to other vertebrates, it is clear that scavengers were unable to fully target floating whale carcasses. This could be explained by differences in size between carcasses or temporal delay during scavenging which allowed further abrasion and disarticulation of skeletal remains. Scavengers that could dismember skeletons were further limited once these arrived in the supraridal flat, whose surroundings were already becoming desertic. It is also possible that predatory fish (such as sharks or sailfishes) were additional victims of toxic algae due to the ingestion of contaminated carcasses. Nevertheless, small feeding traces attributed to crabs have been reported from the skull of at least one whale skeleton.

== Paleobiota of Cerro Ballena ==
Color key: Taxon / Reclassified taxon / Taxon falsely reported as present / Dubious taxon or junior synonym / Ichnotaxon / Ootaxon / Morphotaxon	Notes; Uncertain or tentative taxa are in small text; ~~crossed out~~ taxa are discredited.

=== Algae ===
Genus	Species	Material	Notes	Images
Algae indet.	Indeterminate	"Iron-stained algae growth traces."	Growth trace fossil.	

=== Fish ===
Genus	Species	Material	Notes	Images
Carcharodon	C. hastalis	"Teeth."	A lamnid shark.	
Istiophoridae indet.	Indeterminate	"Nearly complete vertebra and fragmentary rostrum."	A billfish.	
Xiphiidae indet.	Indeterminate	"Partial vertebra."	A billfish.	

=== Invertebrates ===
Genus	Species	Material	Notes	Images
Brachyura indet.	Indeterminate	"Feeding traces on whale skulls."	Crab feeding traces.	
Ophiomorpha	Indeterminate	"Multiple burrows."	Invertebrate trace fossil.	
Psilonichnus	Indeterminate	"Several unorganized traces."	An invertebrate supratidal trace fossil.	
Skolithos-like	Indeterminate	"Elongated vertical tubes."	Invertebrate trace fossil.	
Thalassinoides	Indeterminate	"Web-like traces."	Invertebrate trace fossil.	

=== Mammals ===
==== Cetaceans ====
Genus	Species	Material	Notes	Images
Balaenopteridae indet.	Indeterminate	"Multiple partial to nearly complete skeletons, including juveniles and adults."	A baleen whale.	
Delphinoidea indet.	Indeterminate	"Partial skeleton."	A toothed whale.	
Odobenocetops	Indeterminate	"Fragmentary skull and skeleton, including tusks."	A toothed whale.	
Physeteroidea indet.	Indeterminate	"Teeth and right periotic."	A toothed whale.	

==== Seals ====
Genus	Species	Material	Notes	Images
Acrophoca	Indeterminate	"Scapula and femur."	An earless seal.	
Australophoca	A. changorum	"Left humerus."	An earless seal.	

==== Sloths ====
Genus	Species	Material	Notes	Images
Thalassocnus	T. natans	"Partial lower jaw and femur."	A nothrotheriid ground sloth.	

== See also ==
- Coquimbo Formation
- Pisco Formation
- Evolution of cetaceans
