= Mamaziphius =

Mamaziphius Temporal range: Pliocene (Zanclean-Piacenzian), 9.1–9.0 Ma

Scientific classification
- Kingdom: Animalia
- Phylum: Chordata
- Class: Mammalia
- Order: Artiodactyla
- Infraorder: Cetacea
- Family: Ziphiidae
- Genus: †Mamaziphius; Bianucci et al., 2024

Type species
- †Mamaziphius reyesi Bianucci et al., 2024

Extinct genus of beaked whale

Mamaziphius is an extinct genus of beaked whale that lived during the Late Miocene epoch in what is now Peru. The genus is known from its type and only species, Mamaziphius reyesi, which was described by Giovanni Bianucci and colleagues in 2024. The species was based on the holotype specimen MUSM 4687: a mostly complete skull and a few pieces of the rostrum. This specimen was found in Tortonian-age rocks of the Pisco Formation. The genus name Mamaziphius comes from the name of the hill where the holotype was found, being the larger of a pair known as "la Mama y la Hija" ("the Mother and the Daughter"). The species name reyesi honors Julio Cesar Reyes Robles, who described the extant ziphiid species Mesoplodon peruvianus.
