= Shoreface =

Shoreface may refer to:

- The upper shoreface of a seafloor
- The lower shoreface of a seafloor
