= Los Dedos Paleontological Park =

Neogene paleontological park and locality from Chile

Los Dedos
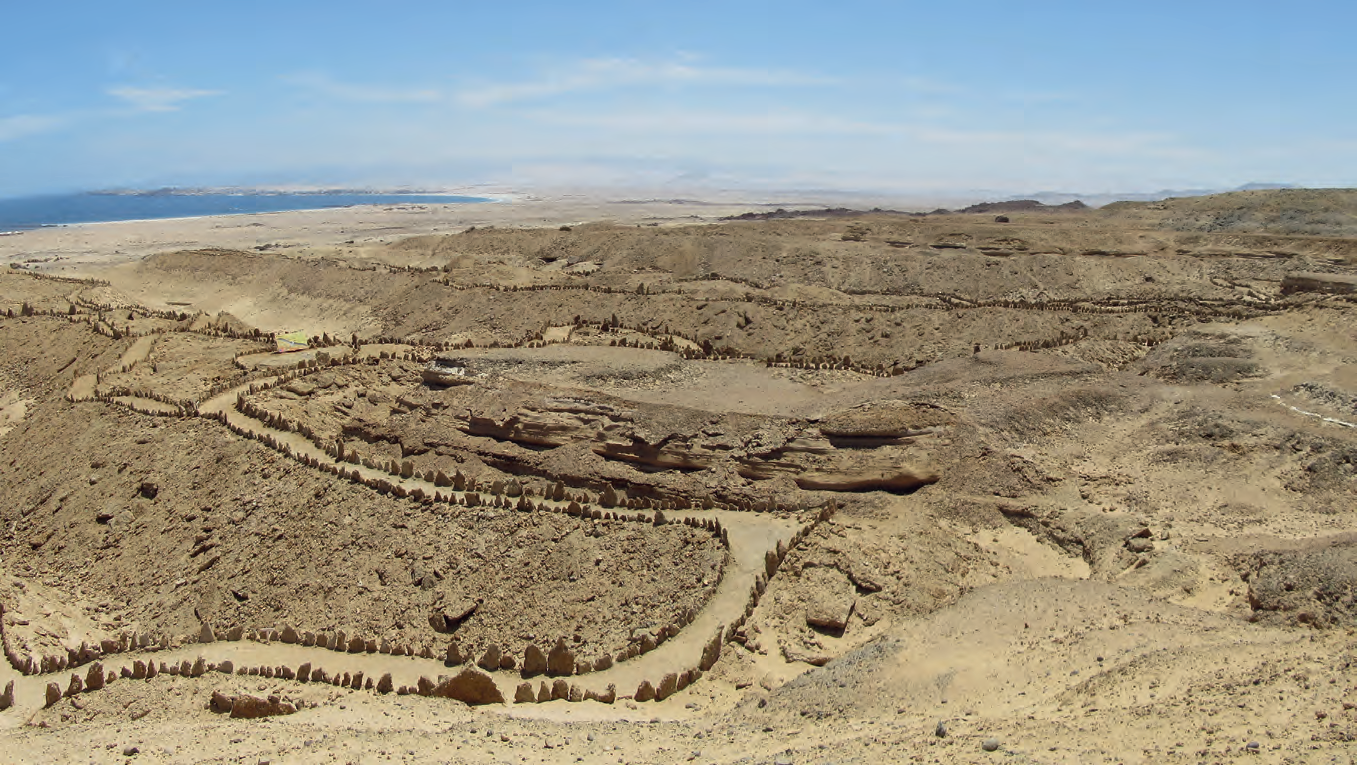
- View of the rocky paths of the park
- Type: Municipal Park and Natural Area
- Location: Caldera, Chile
- Nearest town: Caldera
- Coordinates: 27°9′13.549″S 70°52′54.572″W
- Area: ~370 ha (3,700,000 m^{2})
- Created: 2007
- Etymology: Rock bodies resembling fingers
- Operated by: Municipality of Caldera
- Terrain: Sands and sandstones

Los Dedos Paleontological Park is a public park and highly fossiliferous locality of the Bahía Inglesa Formation, located in the commune of Caldera, Atacama Region, Chile. The park is well known for its abundant fossil remains, comprising mostly marine vertebrate species like Otodus, Pelagornis, Thalassocnus, among others.
