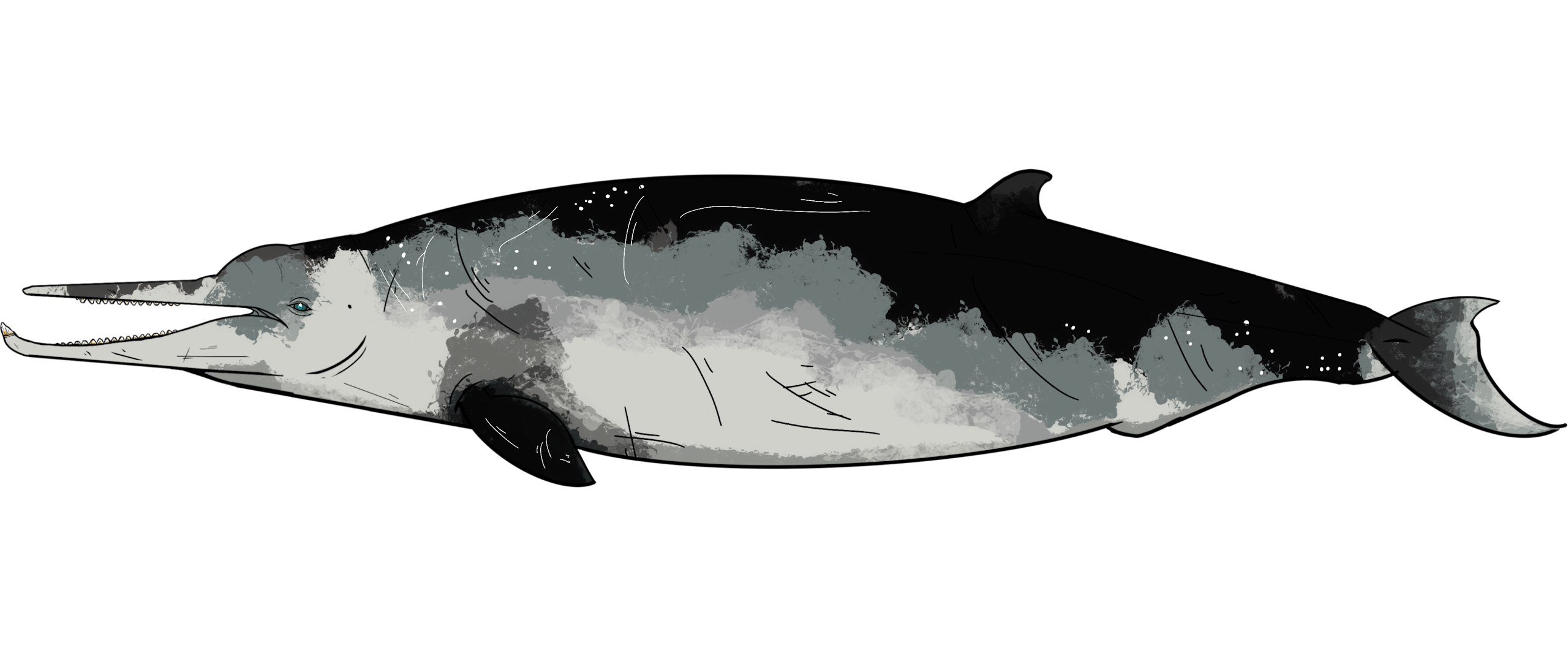

Scientific classification
- Domain: Eukaryota
- Kingdom: Animalia
- Phylum: Chordata
- Class: Mammalia
- Order: Artiodactyla
- Suborder: Whippomorpha
- Infraorder: Cetacea
- Family: Ziphiidae
- Genus: †Ninoziphius; Muizon, 1983

Type species
- †Ninoziphius platyrostris Muizon, 1983

= Ninoziphius =

Ninoziphius Temporal range: Miocene

Extinct genus of mammals

Ninoziphius is a genus of extinct of beaked whale. Fossils have been found in the Eastern United States as well as in South America with specimens being found in the Pisco Formation.
