= Bahía Inglesa Formation =

Geologic formation in Chile

- Stratigraphic range: Miocene–Pleistocene
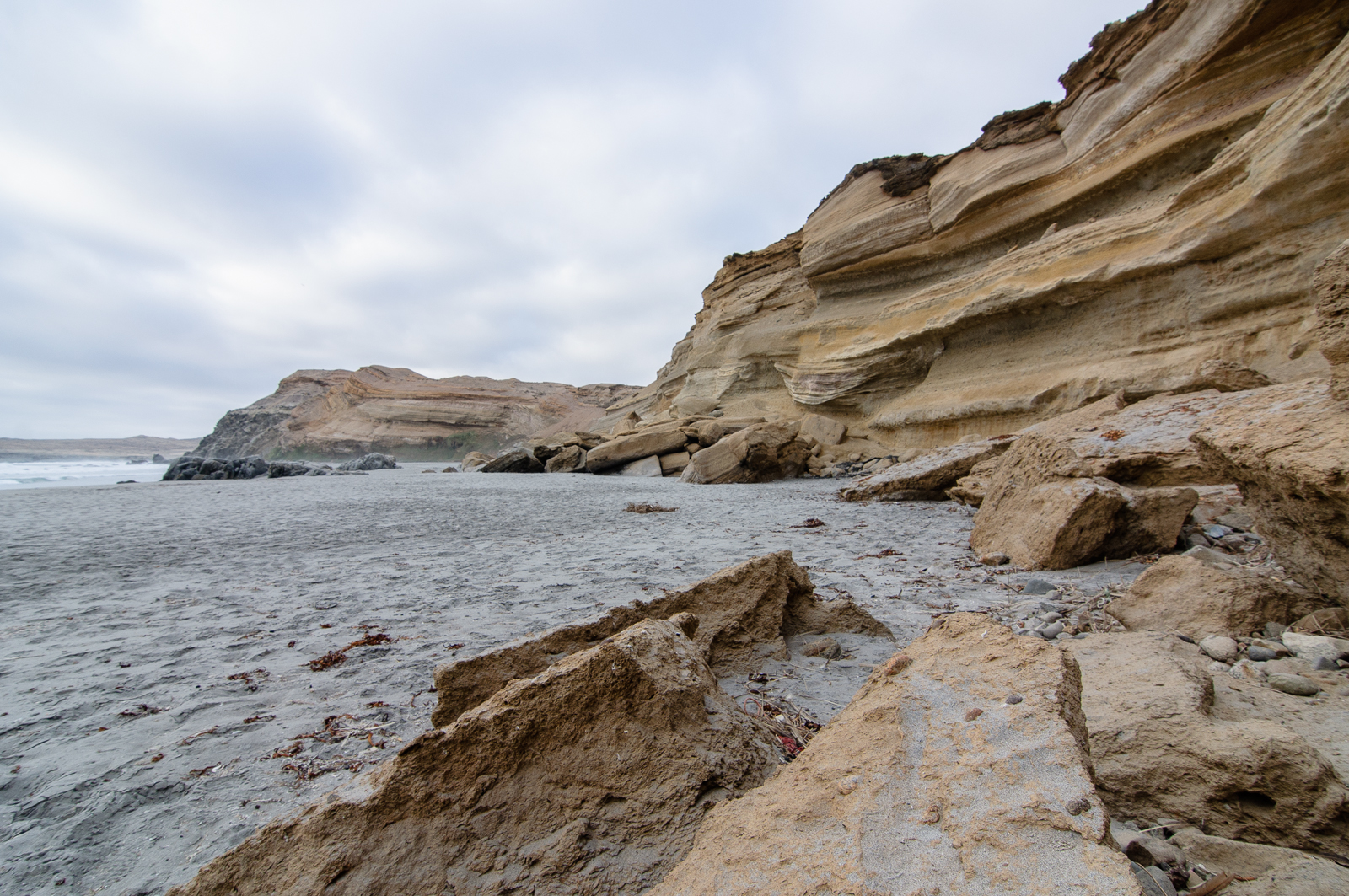
- Bahía Inglesa Formation exposures at Chorrillos beach, far from Bahia Inglesa
- Type: Geological formation
- Underlies: Estratos de Caldera (Caldera Beds)
- Overlies: Angostura Formation

Lithology
- Primary: Conglomerate, coquina, sand, sandstone, siltstone, shale
- Other: Clay, limestone

Location
- Region: Atacama Region
- Country: Chile
- Extent: Caldera Basin

Type section
- Named for: Bahía Inglesa

The Bahía Inglesa Formation (alternatively misspelled "Bahia") is a littoral, sedimentary, and highly fossiliferous geological formation that outcrops across the nearby coastal zones of Caldera, Chile. The unit is part of the greater Caldera Basin and was deposited in deep-shallow water, littoral paleoenvironments. It holds an exquisite fossil record in several localities (such as Cerro Ballena or Los Dedos), mostly composed of marine mammals, as well as invertebrate taxa.

== See also ==
- Coquimbo Formation
- Gaiman Formation
- Pisco Formation
