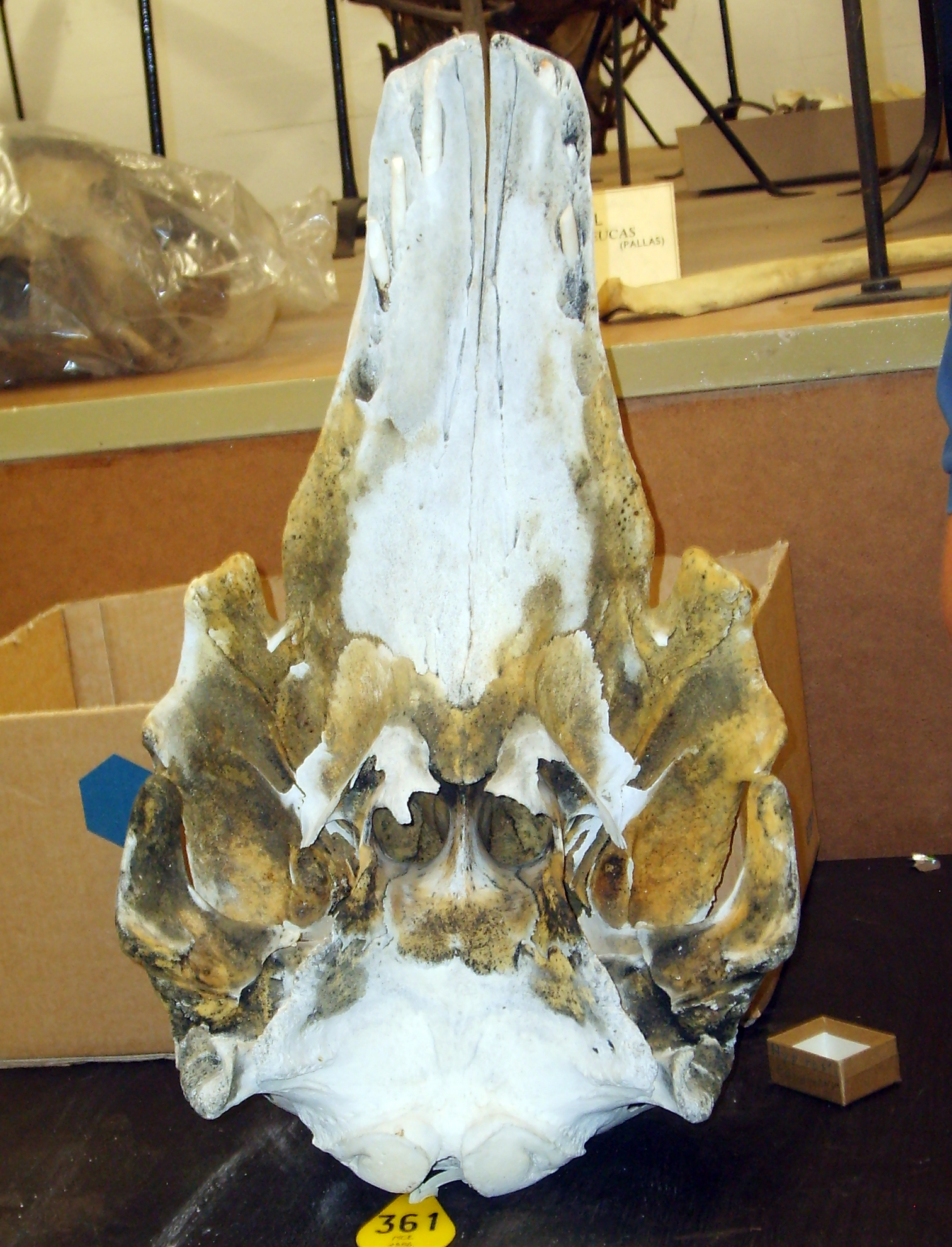
- Skull specimen at Zoological Museum, Copenhagen

Scientific classification
- Kingdom: Animalia
- Phylum: Chordata
- Class: Mammalia
- Order: Artiodactyla
- Infraorder: Cetacea
- Superfamily: Delphinoidea
- Family: Monodontidae
- Hybrid: Delphinapterus leucas × Monodon monoceros

= Narluga =

Hybrid born from mating narwhal and beluga

A narluga (portmanteau of narwhal and beluga) is a hybrid born from mating a female narwhal and a male beluga whale. Narwhals and beluga whales are both cetaceans found in the High Arctic and are the only two living members of the family Monodontidae.

== Discovery ==
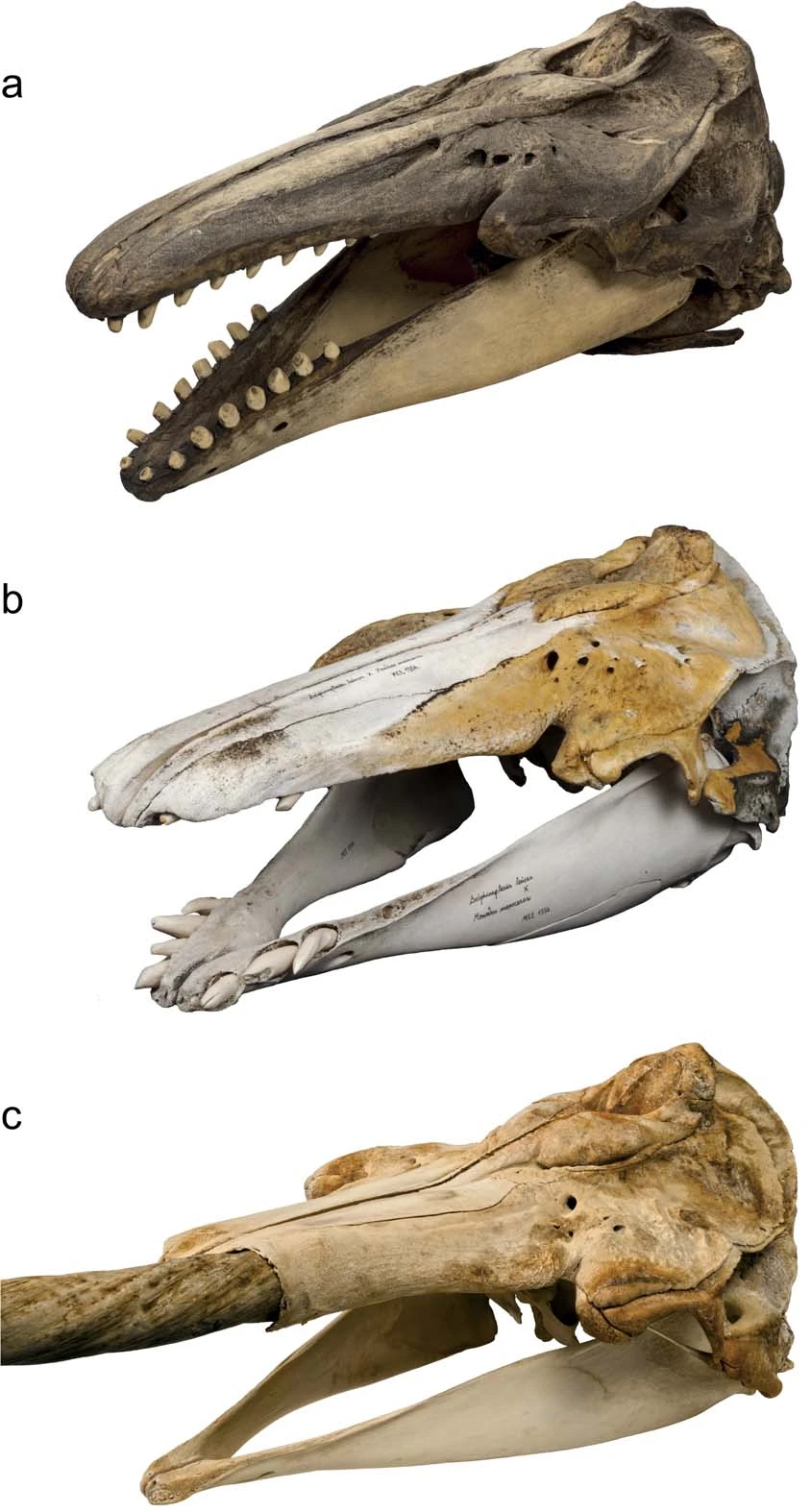
Skulls of a beluga, narluga, and narwhal

The existence of narlugas had been hypothesized for decades before its discovery. There are 20 known cetacean hybrids in existence, with 7 of those occurring only in captivity. In 1990, the researcher Mads Peter Heide-Jørgensen spoke to an Inuk hunter who had captured an unusual hybrid animal that had both beluga and narwhal anatomy. He noted seeing two other anomalous individuals, but no part of them was retained. When Heide-Jørgensen was shown that skull, he determined that it belonged to an unknown Monodontidae. Through analysis of anatomical characters, he and a colleague found that the specimen had some descriptive properties which fell between a narwhal and a beluga. In particular, the characteristic narwhal 'horn' is anatomically a tooth; the unidentified specimen lacked a single narwhal tusk, but its teeth were spiraled, like the tusk of a narwhal. The specimen had 18 teeth, an intermediate number when compared to the beluga (40 teeth) and the narwhal (one tooth). However, not all characters fell between those of narwhals and belugas; the potential hybrid had a skull larger than is usual for either species.

The hybrid genetics of the narluga was confirmed in 2019 when the genome of the specimen was sequenced. Carbon/nitrogen isotopic analysis also found that narlugas have a greater C/N concentration than both parent species.

== Feeding ==
Narwhals and beluga whales are both pelagic feeders, with the largest portion of their diet consisting of Arctic cod. Through analysis of stable isotopes, Skovrind et al. determined that the hybrid had isotopic carbon readings consistent with that of a benthic foraging strategy. The hybrid had outward-facing teeth in its bottom jaw which may have aided in this benthic foraging strategy, allowing it to capture prey more effectively, scooping it off the ocean floor. This proposed foraging strategy differs from that of the gray whale, which rolls on its side on the ocean floor to consume benthic prey. This may fill the niche left open by the anthropogenically extinct Atlantic gray whale, a relative of the benthically feeding Pacific gray whale.

== Species compatibility ==
Despite being each other's closest living relative phylogenetically, narwhals and beluga whales diverged an estimated four million years ago; however, it is predicted that gene flow continued until 1.25–1.65 million years ago. Narwhals and beluga whales have overlapping ranges in the northern Atlantic and Pacific Oceans. As a result of climate change, Arctic cetaceans are at high risk for range contraction, which is likely to increase interspecific interaction between narwhals and belugas whales. Both species exhibit seasonal migrations, and they are most likely to overlap with one another in their summering grounds.

Beluga whales and narwhals use high frequency vocalizations for echolocation; while beluga whales typically utilize higher frequency vocalizations than narwhals do, their vocalization ranges are overlapping. Both species show evidence of context-dependent vocalizations. This indicates possible social compatibility between the two species. However, narwhals also show evidence of pod-specific vocalizations, potentially serving as a barrier to hybridization with beluga whales. The two parental species share a spring mating season, but their mating systems differ. Beluga whales are thought to be more monogamous, whereas narwhals operate under a more polygamous mating system, further differentiating the two socially. Current data on narwhals, beluga whales, and their hybrids is not sufficient to state definitively, but the prevailing thought is that the hybrid would likely not be reproductively viable. In spite of their potential for social incompatibility, the last recorded sighting of the two species comingling was in 2018, when a narwhal was captured via drone footage schooling with a pod of beluga whales.
