= Kattendijk Formation =

Geologic formation in Belgium

- Stratigraphic range: Zanclean
- Type: Geological formation
- Underlies: Various Quaternary aged formations
- Overlies: Rupellian Clay Formation
- Thickness: 5–15 m (16–49 ft)

Lithology
- Primary: Sand

Location
- Coordinates: 51°18.5667′N 3°12.3675′E
- Region: Flanders
- Country: Belgium

Type section
- Year defined: De Heuter and Laga, 1976
- Kattendijk Formation (Belgium)

The Kattendijk Formation (also known as the Kattendijk Sands) is a five-million-year-old marine geological formation with outcrops north of Antwerp, Belgium. The area was named by De Heuter and Laga in 1976. The sands range from medium fine to coarse and contain a large proportion of shell grit.

== Geology ==
The clay is of Rupelian age and developed to a depth of approximately 70 m (230 ft) beneath a deposit of Neogene sand. The formation has a Miocene epoch aquifer, while the clay level dates to the Pliocene.

== Palaeontology ==
Color key: Taxon / Reclassified taxon / Taxon falsely reported as present / Dubious taxon or junior synonym / Ichnotaxon / Ootaxon / Morphotaxon

Notes
Uncertain or tentative taxa are in small text
~~crossed out~~ taxa are discredited.

=== Birds ===
Birds of the Kattendijk Formation
Genus	Species	Location	Material	Notes	Images
Alca	A. stewarti		A patellar skeleton including humeri and ulnae	A relative of the modern razorbill	Modern razorbill (A. torda)

=== Cetaceans ===
Cetaceans of the Kattendijk Formation
Genus	Species	Location	Material	Notes	Images
Pliodelphis	P. doelensis		A partial skull	A small oceanic dolphin	
Balaenella	B. brachyrhynus		A partial skull	A relative of modern right whales	
Casatia	Inderterminate		A partial skeleton	A relative to the modern narwhal and beluga	Holotype of C. thermophila from Italy
Quasibalaena	Q. portisantuerpiae			A relative of modern bowhead whales	

=== Fish ===
Shark teeth have been found in the formation, and bite marks attributed to Hexanchus griseus (bluntnose sixgill shark) and Carcharodon plicatilis have been reported on the fossil bones of cetaceans.
