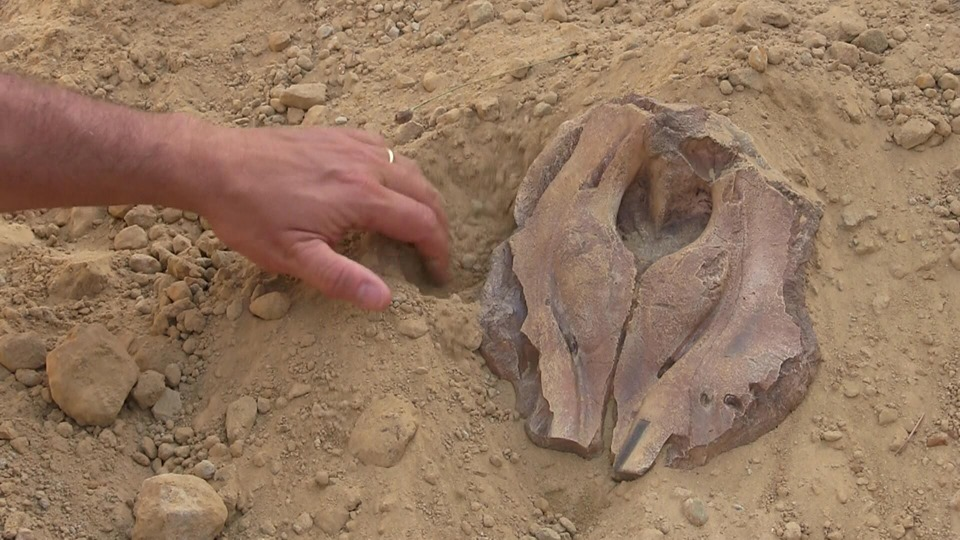
- Photograph of the excavation of the holotype

Scientific classification
- Kingdom: Animalia
- Phylum: Chordata
- Class: Mammalia
- Order: Artiodactyla
- Infraorder: Cetacea
- Family: Monodontidae
- Genus: †Casatia; Bianucci et al., 2019
- Species: †C. thermophila

Binomial name
- †Casatia thermophila Bianucci et al., 2019

= Casatia =

Casatia Temporal range: Early Pliocene

Extinct genus of cetaceans

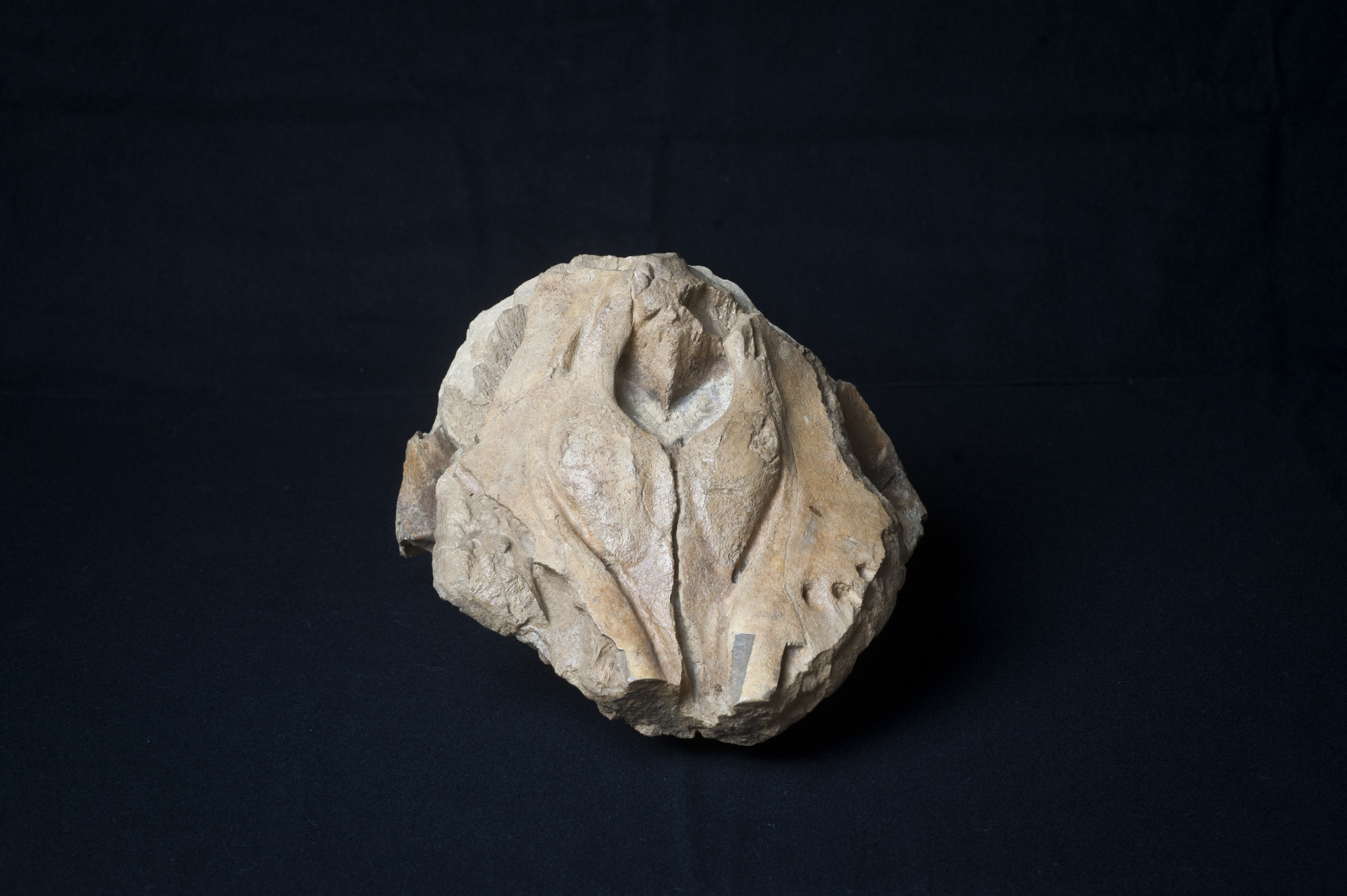
C. thermophila, holotype kept at the Natural History Museum of the University of Pisa

Casatia is an extinct genus of cetacean in the family Monodontidae, known from the Early Pliocene, approximately between 5.1 to 4.5 million years ago. The type species, C. thermophila, was described in 2019 from a partial skull found in Italy, representing the only known fossils of a monodontid from the Mediterranean Basin. Its closest living relatives are the narwhal and beluga, though the remains were found farther south than these species, supporting the hypothesis that monodontids evolved in warmer regions before adapting to cold water. Other partial indeterminate remains are known from the Kattendijk Formation of Belgium.

== Palaeoecology ==
Fossils of C. thermophila were also found near fossils of the modern bull and tiger sharks as well as many extinct marine mammals, such as the sirenian Metaxytherium subapenninum.

A partial skeleton of an indeterminate species of Casatia from the Kattendijk Formation of Belgium shows evidence of bite marks belonging to the lamnid shark Carcharodon plicatilis. The marks suggest an attempt by the predator to sever the head from the rest of the body, pointing to the forehead region as the main targeted area.
