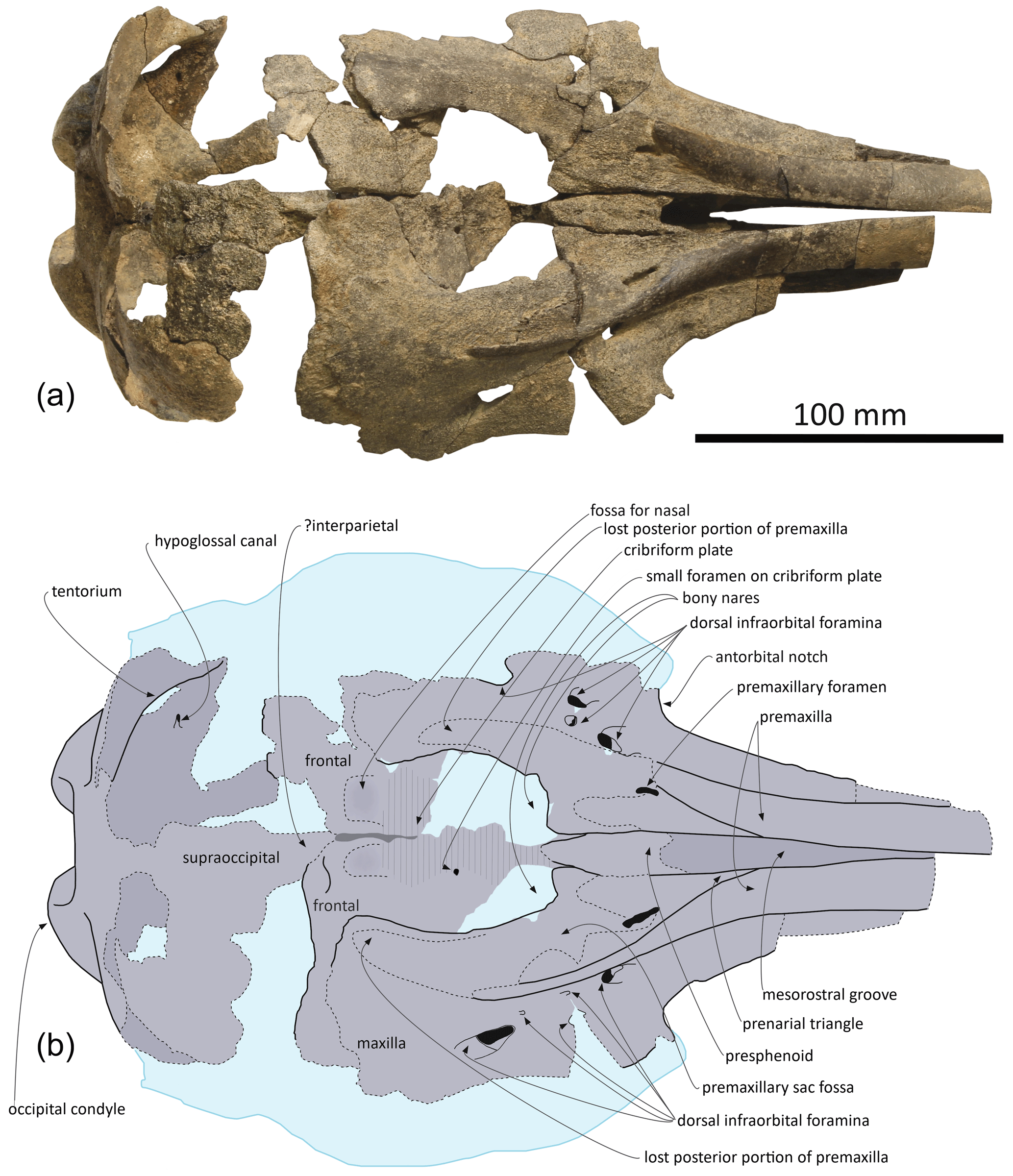
- Holotype skull in dorsal view

Scientific classification
- Domain: Eukaryota
- Kingdom: Animalia
- Phylum: Chordata
- Class: Mammalia
- Order: Artiodactyla
- Infraorder: Cetacea
- Superfamily: Delphinoidea
- Family: Delphinidae
- Genus: †Pliodelphis; Belluzo & Lambert, 2021

Type species
- †Pliodelphis doelensis Belluzo & Lambert, 2021

= Pliodelphis =

Pliodelphis Temporal range: Early Pliocene (Zanclean), 5–4.4 Ma

Small Pliocene Dolphin

Pliodelphis (meaning "Pliocene dolphin") is a genus of small delphinid (oceanic dolphin) cetaceans that lived in Belgium during the Early Miocene epoch, about 5 million to 4.4 million years ago. The genus contains the type species Pliodelphis doelensis, named and described in 2021 based on a partial skull recovered from the littoral Kattendijk Formation.

== See also ==
- Evolution of cetaceans
