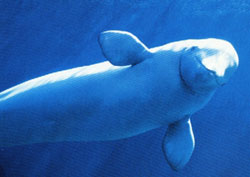
- Beluga whale

Scientific classification
- Kingdom: Animalia
- Phylum: Chordata
- Class: Mammalia
- Infraclass: Placentalia
- Order: Artiodactyla
- Infraorder: Cetacea
- Superfamily: Delphinoidea
- Family: Monodontidae; J. E. Gray, 1821

Type genus
- Monodon C. Linnaeus, 1758

Extant genera
- Monodon; Delphinapterus
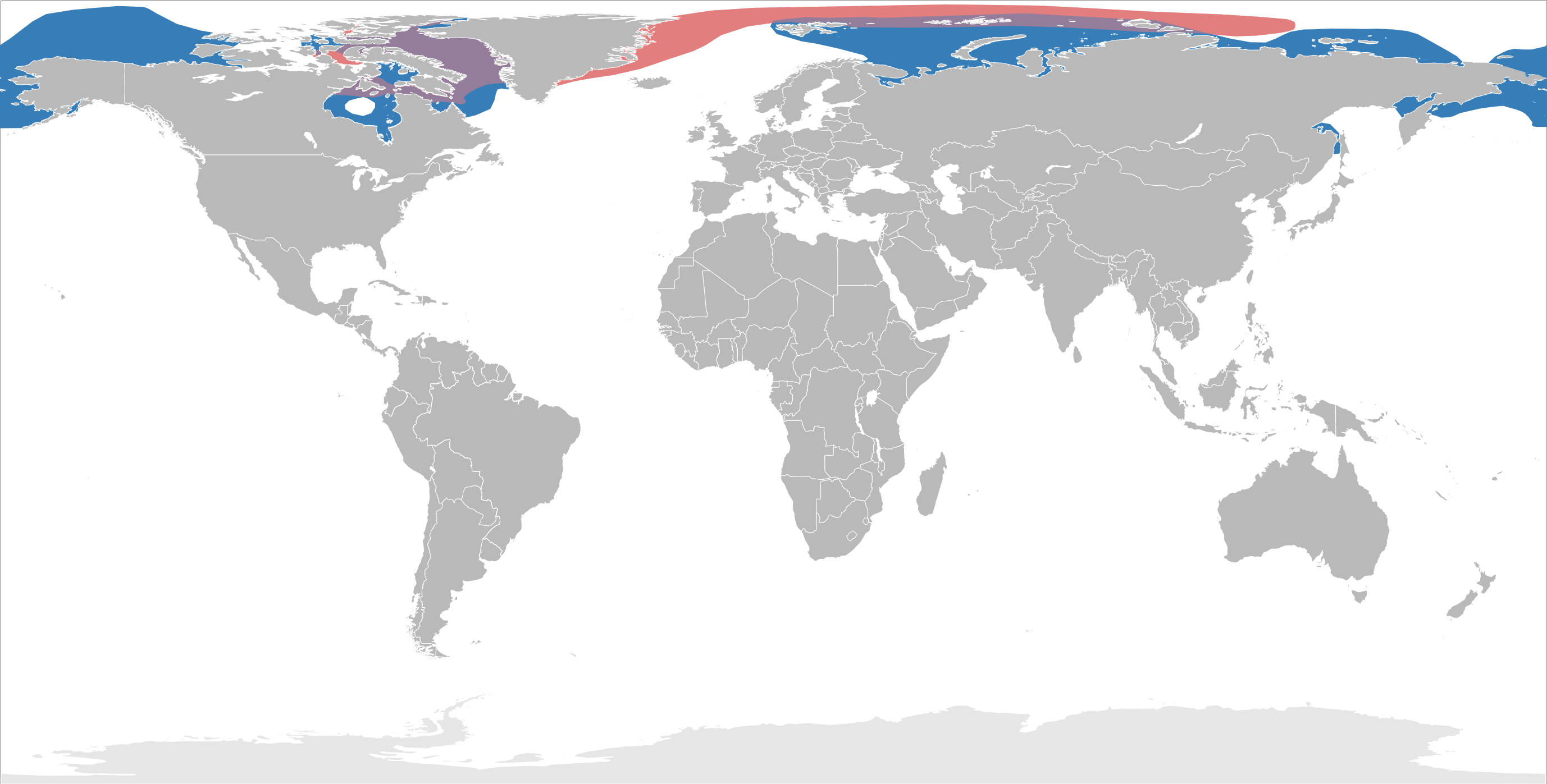
- Distribution of extant Monodontids; Monodon in red, Delphinapterus in blue. Overlap in purple.

= Monodontidae =

Monodontidae Temporal range: Late Miocene–Recent

Family of mammals

The cetacean family Monodontidae comprises two living whale species, the narwhal and the beluga whale and at least four extinct species, known from the fossil record. Beluga and narwhal are native to coastal regions and pack ice around the Arctic Ocean. Both species are relatively small whales, 3–5 m (9.8–16.4 ft) in length, with a forehead melon, and a short or absent snout. Premaxillary teeth are absent. They do not have a true dorsal fin, but do have a narrow ridge running along the back, which is much more pronounced in the narwhal. They are highly vocal animals, communicating with a wide range of sounds. Like other whales, they also use echolocation to navigate. Belugas can be found in the far north of the Atlantic and Pacific Oceans; the distribution of narwhals is restricted to the Arctic and Atlantic Oceans.

Monodontids have a wide-ranging carnivorous diet, feeding on fish, molluscs, and small crustaceans. They have reduced teeth, with the beluga having numerous simple teeth, and the narwhal having only two teeth, one of which forms the tusks in males. Gestation lasts 14–15 months in both species, and almost always results in a single calf. The young are not weaned for a full two years, and do not reach sexual maturity until they are five to eight years of age. Family groups travel as part of herds, or 'pods', which may contain several hundred individuals.

== Taxonomy ==
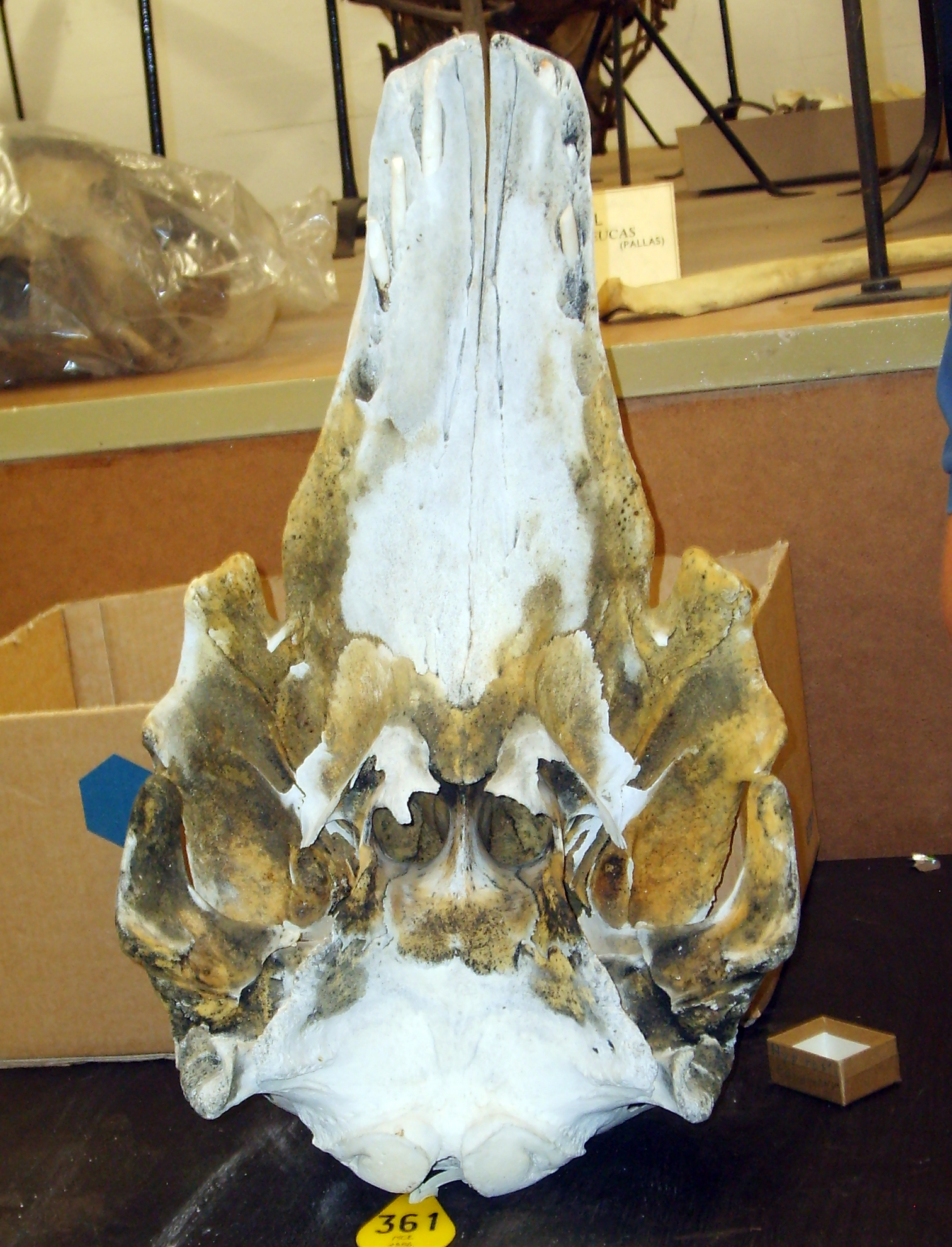
Skull of a cross between a narwhal and a beluga whale, at the Zoological Museum, Copenhagen

The monodontids, oceanic dolphins (Delphinidae) and porpoises (Phocoenidae) together comprise the Delphinoidea superfamily. Genetic evidence suggests the porpoises are more closely related to the monodontids, and these two families constitute a clade that diverged from the oceanic dolphins within the past 11 million years.

- Suborder Odontoceti
  - Superfamily Delphinoidea
    - Family Monodontidae
      - Genus †Haborodelphis
        - Haborodelphis japonicus
      - Genus † Denebola
        - Denebola brachycephala
      - Subfamily Delphinapterinae
        - Genus Delphinapterus
          - Delphinapterus leucas, beluga
        - Genus †Casatia
          - Casatia thermophila
      - Subfamily Monodontinae
        - Genus † Bohaskaia
          - Bohaskaia monodontoides
        - Genus Monodon
          - Monodon monoceros, narwhal
