= Haborodelphis =

Haborodelphis Temporal range: Early Pliocene

Scientific classification
- Domain: Eukaryota
- Kingdom: Animalia
- Phylum: Chordata
- Class: Mammalia
- Order: Artiodactyla
- Infraorder: Cetacea
- Family: Monodontidae
- Genus: †Haborodelphis; Ichishima et al., 2018
- Species: †H. japonicus

Binomial name
- †Haborodelphis japonicus Ichishima et al., 2018

Extinct genus of mammals

Haborodelphis is an extinct genus of beluga-like odontocete cetacean known from the Early Pliocene from the north-west Pacific. It was first named by Hiroto Ichishima and colleagues in 2018 and the type species is H. japonicus.

The type fossil was found in the Embetsu Formation in Haboro, Japan. There is only one known specimen as of 2021.
