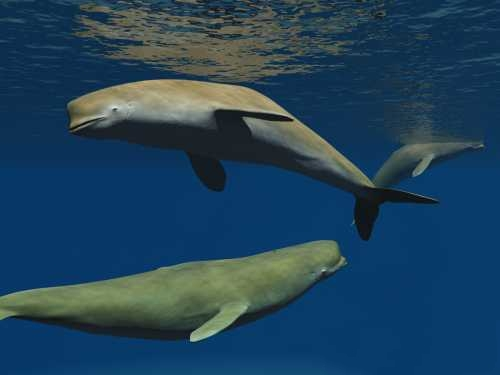
- Restoration

Scientific classification
- Domain: Eukaryota
- Kingdom: Animalia
- Phylum: Chordata
- Class: Mammalia
- Order: Artiodactyla
- Infraorder: Cetacea
- Family: Monodontidae
- Genus: †Bohaskaia; Vélez-Juarbe & Pyenson, 2012
- Species: †B. monodontoides

Binomial name
- †Bohaskaia monodontoides Vélez-Juarbe & Pyenson, 2012

= Bohaskaia =

Bohaskaia Temporal range: Early Pliocene

Extinct genus of mammals

Bohaskaia is an extinct genus of beluga-like odontocete cetacean known from the Early Pliocene of Virginia and North Carolina, United States. It was first named by Jorge Vélez-Juarbe and Nicholas D. Pyenson in 2012 and the type species is Bohaskaia monodontoides.
