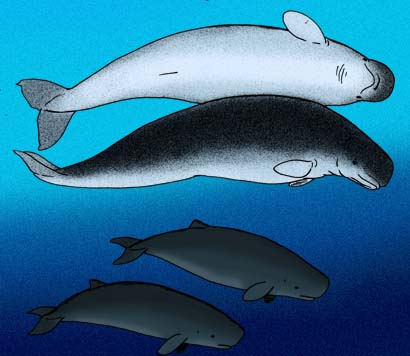
- D. brachycephala and Praekogia

Scientific classification
- Kingdom: Animalia
- Phylum: Chordata
- Class: Mammalia
- Order: Artiodactyla
- Infraorder: Cetacea
- Family: Monodontidae
- Genus: †Denebola; Barnes, 1984
- Species: †D. brachycephala

Binomial name
- †Denebola brachycephala Barnes, 1984

= Denebola brachycephala =

Denebola brachycephala Temporal range: Late Miocene

Extinct species of whale related to belugas

Denebola is an extinct genus of whale belonging to the family Monodontidae. It contains a single known species, Denebola brachycephala. It is the earliest known ancestor of the beluga, Delphinapterus leucas, and dates from the Upper Miocene period. A fossil was found in the Baja California peninsula, indicating that the family once existed in warmer waters.
