= List of marine mammal species =

Marine mammals comprise over 130 living and recently extinct species in three taxonomic orders. The Society for Marine Mammalogy, an international scientific society, maintains a list of valid species and subspecies, most recently updated in October 2015. This list follows the Society's taxonomy regarding and subspecies.

Conservation status codes listed follow the IUCN Red List of Threatened Species (v. 2014.3; data current at 19 January 2015) and are clickable to link to IUCN Red List species pages.

EX - extinct

EW - extinct in the wild
CR - critically endangered
EN - endangered
VU - vulnerable
NT - near threatened
LC - least concern
DD - data deficient

NE - not evaluated

== Order Cetartiodactyla ==
Footnote on use of Cetartiodactyla (Note: The use of Order Cetartiodactyla, instead of Cetacea with Suborders Odontoceti and Mysticeti, is favored by most evolutionary mammalogists working with molecular data and is supported by the IUCN Cetacean Specialist Group and by the Taxonomy Committee of the Society for Marine Mammalogy, the largest international association of marine mammal scientists in the world. See Cetartiodactyla and Marine mammal articles for further discussion.)

=== Mysticeti (baleen whales) ===
==== Balaenidae ====
- North Atlantic right whale, Eubalaena glacialis EN^{IUCN}
- North Pacific right whale, Eubalaena japonica EN^{IUCN}
- Southern right whale, Eubalaena australis LC^{IUCN}
- Bowhead whale or Greenland right whale, Balaena mysticetus LC^{IUCN}

==== Balaenopteridae (rorquals) ====
- Common minke whale, Balaenoptera acutorostrata LC^{IUCN} (ssp. acutorostrata - North Atlantic minke whale NE, ssp. scammoni - North Pacific minke whale NE, unnamed ssp. dwarf minke whale NE)
- Antarctic minke whale, Balaenoptera bonaerensis DD^{IUCN}
- Sei whale, Balaenoptera borealis EN^{IUCN} (ssp. borealis - northern sei whale NE, ssp. schlegellii - southern sei whale NE)
- Bryde's whale, Balaenoptera edeni DD^{IUCN} (ssp. brydei - Bryde's whale NE, ssp. edeni - Eden's whale NE )
- Omura's whale, Balaenoptera omurai DD^{IUCN}
- Blue whale, Balaenoptera musculus EN^{IUCN} (ssp. musculus - northern blue whale NE, ssp. brevicauda - pygmy blue whale DD^{IUCN}, ssp. intermedia - southern blue whale CR^{IUCN}, ssp. indica - great Indian blue whale NE)
- Fin whale, Balaenoptera physalus EN^{IUCN} (ssp. patachonica pygmy fin whale NE, ssp. physalus - northern fin whale NE but Mediterranean Subpopulation VU^{IUCN}, ssp. quoyi - southern fin whale NE)
- Humpback whale, Megaptera novaeangliae LC^{IUCN} (ssp. novaeangliae North Atlantic humpback whale NE, ssp. kuzira - North Pacific humpback whale NE, ssp. australis - southern humpback whale NE but Oceania subpopulation EN^{IUCN}, isolated subpopulation in Arabian Sea EN^{IUCN})

==== Neobalaenidae ====
- Pygmy right whale, Caperea marginata DD^{IUCN}

==== Eschrichtiidae (gray whales) ====
- Gray whale, Eschrichtius robustus LC^{IUCN}

=== Odontoceti (toothed whales) ===
==== Physeteridae (sperm whales) ====
- Sperm whale, Physeter macrocephalus VU^{IUCN}

==== Kogiidae ====
- Pygmy sperm whale, Kogia breviceps DD^{IUCN}
- Dwarf sperm whale, Kogia simus DD^{IUCN}

==== Ziphiidae (beaked whales) ====
- Arnoux's beaked whale, Berardius arnuxii DD^{IUCN}
- Baird's beaked whale, Berardius bairdii DD^{IUCN}
- Sato's beaked whale, Berardius minimus NT^{IUCN}
- Northern bottlenose whale, Hyperoodon ampullatus DD^{IUCN}
- Southern bottlenose whale, Hyperoodon planifrons LC^{IUCN}
- Tropical bottlenose whale, Indopacetus pacificus DD^{IUCN}
- Sowerby's beaked whale, Mesoplodon bidens DD^{IUCN}
- Andrews' beaked whale, Mesoplodon bowdoini DD^{IUCN}
- Hubbs' beaked whale, Mesoplodon carlhubbsi DD^{IUCN}
- Blainville's beaked whale, Mesoplodon densirostris DD^{IUCN}
- Gervais' beaked whale, Mesoplodon europaeus DD^{IUCN}
- Ginkgo-toothed beaked whale, Mesoplodon ginkgodens DD^{IUCN}
- Gray's beaked whale, Mesoplodon grayi DD^{IUCN}
- Hector's beaked whale, Mesoplodon hectori DD^{IUCN}
- Deraniyagala's beaked whale, Mesoplodon hotaula NE
- Strap-toothed whale, Mesoplodon layardii DD^{IUCN}
- True's beaked whale, Mesoplodon mirus DD^{IUCN}
- Perrin's beaked whale, Mesoplodon perrini DD^{IUCN}
- Pygmy beaked whale, Mesoplodon peruvianus DD^{IUCN}
- Stejneger's beaked whale, Mesoplodon stejnegeri DD^{IUCN}
- Spade-toothed whale, Mesoplodon traversii DD^{IUCN}
- Shepherd's beaked whale, Tasmacetus shepherdi DD^{IUCN}
- Cuvier's beaked whale, Ziphius cavirostris LC^{IUCN}

==== Platanistidae ====
- Ganges river dolphin, Platanista gangetica EN^{IUCN}
- Indus river dolphin, Platanista minor EN^{IUCN}

==== Iniidae ====
- Amazon river dolphin, Inia geoffrensis DD^{IUCN} (ssp. geoffrensis - common boto NE, ssp. boliviensis - Bolivian bufeo NE)

==== Lipotidae ====
- Baiji, Lipotes vexillifer CR^{IUCN}, possibly EX

==== Pontoporiidae ====
- La Plata dolphin (Franciscana), Pontoporia blainvillei VU^{IUCN}

==== Monodontidae ====
- Beluga, Delphinapterus leucas LC^{IUCN} (Cook Inlet Subpopulation CR^{IUCN})
- Narwhal, Monodon monoceros LC^{IUCN}

==== Delphinidae (oceanic dolphins) ====
- Dusky dolphin, Aethalodelphis obscurus DD^{IUCN} (ssp. fitzroyi - Fitzroy's dolphin NE, ssp. obscurus - African dusky dolphin NE, ssp. posidonia - Chilean dusky dolphin NE, unnamed spp. - New Zealand dusky dolphin NE)
- Pacific white-sided dolphin, Aethalodelphis obliquidens LC^{IUCN}
- Peale's dolphin, Cephalorhynchus australis DD^{IUCN}
- Commerson's dolphin, Cephalorhynchus commersonii DD^{IUCN} (ssp. commersonii - Commerson's dolphin NE, ssp. kerguelenensis - Kerguelen Islands Commerson's dolphin NE)
- Hourglass dolphin, Cephalorhynchus cruciger LC^{IUCN}
- Chilean dolphin, Cephalorhynchus eutropia NT^{IUCN}
- Heaviside's dolphin, Cephalorhynchus heavisidii DD^{IUCN}
- Hector's dolphin, Cephalorhynchus hectori (ssp. hectori - South Island Hector's dolphin EN^{IUCN}, ssp. maui - Maui's dolphin or North Island Hector's dolphin CR^{IUCN})
- Long-beaked common dolphin, Delphinus capensis DD^{IUCN} (ssp. capensis - long-beaked common dolphin NE, ssp. tropicalis - Indo-Pacific common dolphin NE)
- Short-beaked common dolphin, Delphinus delphis LC^{IUCN} (ssp. delphis - short-beaked common dolphin Mediterranean Subpopulation EN^{IUCN}, ssp. ponticus - Black Sea common dolphin VU^{IUCN})
- Pygmy killer whale, Feresa attenuata DD^{IUCN}
- Short-finned pilot whale, Globicephala macrorhynchus DD^{IUCN}
- Long-finned pilot whale, Globicephala melas DD^{IUCN} (ssp. edwardii - southern long-finned pilot whale NE, ssp. melas - North Atlantic long-finned pilot whale NE, unnamed spp. - North Pacific long-finned pilot whale EX)
- Risso's dolphin, Grampus griseus LC^{IUCN}
- Fraser's dolphin, Lagenodelphis hosei LC^{IUCN}
- White-beaked dolphin, Lagenorhynchus albirostris LC^{IUCN}
- Atlantic white-sided dolphin, Leucopleurus acutus LC^{IUCN}
- Northern right whale dolphin, Lissodelphis borealis LC^{IUCN}
- Southern right whale dolphin, Lissodelphis peronii DD^{IUCN}
- Irrawaddy dolphin, Orcaella brevirostris VU^{IUCN}
- Australian snubfin dolphin, Orcaella heinsohni NT^{IUCN}
- Orca (killer whale), Orcinus orca DD^{IUCN} (unnamed ssp. - resident killer whale NE, unnamed ssp. transient killer whale NE)
- Melon-headed whale, Peponocephala electra LC^{IUCN}
- False killer whale, Pseudorca crassidens DD^{IUCN}
- Atlantic humpback dolphin, Sousa teuszii VU^{IUCN}
- Indo-Pacific humpbacked dolphin, Sousa chinensis NT^{IUCN}, (ssp. chinensis - Chinese humpback dolphin NE, ssp. taiwanensis - Taiwanese humpback dolphins NE)
- Indian Ocean humpback dolphin, Sousa plumbea NE
- Australian humpback dolphin, Sousa sahulensis NE
- Tucuxi, Sotalia fluvialis DD^{IUCN}
- Guiana dolphin (Costero), Sotalia guianensis DD^{IUCN}
- Pantropical spotted dolphin, Stenella attenuata LC^{IUCN} (ssp. attenuata - Offshore pantropical spotted dolphin NE, ssp. graffmani - Coastal pantropical spotted dolphin NE)
- Clymene dolphin, Stenella clymene DD^{IUCN}
- Striped dolphin, Stenella coeruleoalba LC^{IUCN}
- Atlantic spotted dolphin, Stenella frontalis DD^{IUCN}
- Spinner dolphin, Stenella longirostris DD^{IUCN} (ssp. centroamericana - Central American spinner dolphin NE, ssp. longirostris - Gray's spinner dolphin NE, ssp. orientalis - Eastern spinner dolphin VU^{IUCN}, ssp. roseiventris - dwarf spinner dolphin NE)
- Rough-toothed dolphin, Steno bredanensis LC^{IUCN}
- Indo-Pacific bottlenose dolphin, Tursiops aduncus DD^{IUCN}
- Common bottlenose dolphin, Tursiops truncatus LC^{IUCN} (ssp. truncatus - Atlantic bottlenose dolphin Fiordland subpopulation CR^{IUCN} and Mediterranean subpopulation VU^{IUCN}, ssp. gillii - Pacific bottlenose dolphin, ssp. poncticus - Black Sea bottlenose dolphin CR^{IUCN})
- Burrunan dolphin, Tursiops australis NE

==== Phocoenidae (porpoises) ====
- Indo-Pacific finless porpoise, Neophocaena phocaenoides VU^{IUCN}
- Narrow-ridged finless porpoise, Neophocaena asiaeorientalis VU^{IUCN}, (spp. asiaeorientalis - Yangtze finless porpoise CR^{IUCN}, ssp. sumameri - East Asian finless porpoise (sunameri) NE)
- Spectacled porpoise, Phocoena dioptrica DD^{IUCN}
- Harbour porpoise, Phocoena phocoena LC^{IUCN} (Baltic Sea subpopoulation CR^{IUCN}) (ssp. phocoena - Atlantic harbour porpoise NE, ssp. vomerina - Eastern Pacific harbour porpoise NE, ssp. relicta - Black Sea harbour porpoise EN^{IUCN}, unnamed ssp. Western Pacific harbour porpoise NE)
- Vaquita, Phocoena sinus CR^{IUCN}
- Burmeister's porpoise, Phocoena spinipinnis DD^{IUCN}
- Dall's porpoise, Phocoenoides dalli LC^{IUCN} (ssp. dalli - Dalli-type Dall's porpoise NE, ssp. truei - Truei-type Dall's porpoiseNE)

== Order Sirenia (sea cows) ==
=== Trichechidae ===
- Amazonian manatee, Trichechus inunguis VU^{IUCN}
- West Indian manatee, Trichechus manatus VU^{IUCN} (ssp. latirostris - Florida manatee EN^{IUCN}, ssp. manatus - Antillean manatee EN^{IUCN})
- African manatee, Trichechus senegalensis VU^{IUCN}

=== Dugongidae ===
- Dugong, Dugong dugon VU^{IUCN}
- Steller's sea cow, Hydrodamalis gigas EX^{IUCN}

== Order Carnivora (carnivorans) ==
=== Pinnipedia (seals) ===
==== Otariidae (eared seals) ====
- Brown fur seal, Arctocephalus pusillus LC^{IUCN} (ssp. pusillus - Cape fur seal NE, ssp. doriferus - Australian fur seal NE)
- South American fur seal, Arctophoca australis LC^{IUCN} (ssp. australis - South American fur seal NE, unnamed ssp. - Peruvian fur seal NE)
- New Zealand fur seal, Arctophoca forsteri LC^{IUCN}
- Galápagos fur seal, Arctophoca galapagoensis EN^{IUCN}
- Antarctic fur seal, Arctophoca gazella LC^{IUCN}
- Juan Fernández fur seal, Arctophoca philippii LC^{IUCN}
- Guadalupe fur seal, Arctophoca townsendi LC^{IUCN}
- Subantarctic fur seal, Arctophoca tropicalis LC^{IUCN}
- Northern fur seal, Callorhinus ursinus VU^{IUCN}
- Steller sea lion, Eumetopias jubatus NT^{IUCN} (ssp. jubatus - western Steller sea lion EN^{IUCN}, ssp. monteriensis - Loughlin's Steller sea lion LC^{IUCN})
- Australian sea lion, Neophoca cinerea EN^{IUCN}
- South American sea lion, Otaria byronia LC^{IUCN}
- New Zealand sea lion, Phocarctos hookeri EN^{IUCN}
- California sea lion, Zalophus californianus LC^{IUCN}
- Japanese sea lion, Zalophus japonicus EX^{IUCN}
- Galápagos sea lion, Zalophus wollebaeki EN^{IUCN}

==== Odobenidae ====
- Walrus, Odobenus rosmarus DD^{IUCN} (ssp. divergens - Pacific walrus NE, ssp. rosmarus - Atlantic walrus NE)

==== Phocidae (earless seals) ====
- Hooded seal, Cystophora cristata VU^{IUCN}
- Bearded seal, Erignathus barbatus LC^{IUCN} (ssp. barbatus - Atlantic bearded seal NE, ssp. nauticus - Pacific bearded seal NE)
- Grey seal, Halichoerus grypus LC^{IUCN} (ssp. grypus - Western Atlantic grey seal NE, ssp. macrorhynchus - Eastern Atlantic grey seal NE)
- Ribbon seal, Histriophoca fasciata DD^{IUCN}
- Leopard seal, Hydrurga leptonyx LC^{IUCN}
- Weddell seal, Leptonychotes weddellii LC^{IUCN}
- Crabeater seal, Lobodon carcinophagus LC^{IUCN}
- Southern elephant seal, Mirounga leonina LC^{IUCN}
- Northern elephant seal, Mirounga angustirostris LC^{IUCN}
- Mediterranean monk seal, Monachus monachus VU^{IUCN}
- Hawaiian monk seal, Neomonachus schauinslandi CR^{IUCN}
- Caribbean monk seal, Neomonachus tropicalis EX^{IUCN}
- Ross seal, Ommatophoca rossii LC^{IUCN}
- Harp seal, Pagophilus groenlandicus LC^{IUCN}
- Harbor seal, Phoca vitulina LC^{IUCN} (ssp. vitulina - Atlantic harbor seal NE, ssp. mellonae - Ungava harbor seal NE, ssp. richardii - Pacific harbour seal NE)
- Spotted seal, Phoca largha DD^{IUCN}
- Ringed seal, Pusa hispida LC^{IUCN} (ssp. hispida - Arctic ringed seal NE, ssp. botnica - Baltic ringed seal NE, ssp. ochotensis - Okhotsk ringed seal NE, ssp. ladogensis - Lake Logoda ringed seal NE, ssp. saimensis - Saima seal )
- Caspian seal, Pusa caspica EN^{IUCN}
- Baikal seal, Pusa sibirica LC^{IUCN}

==== Ursidae (bears) ====
- Polar bear, Ursus maritimus VU^{IUCN}

==== Mustelidae ====
- Sea otter, Enhydra lutris EN^{IUCN} (ssp. kenyoni - northern sea otter NE, ssp. lutris - common sea otter NE, ssp. nereis - southern sea otter NE)
- Marine otter, Lontra felina EN^{IUCN}
- Sea mink, Neogale macrodon EX^{IUCN}

== See also ==
- List of mammals
- List of cetaceans
- Vancouver Coastal Sea wolf (Canis lupus crassodon), a subspecies of gray wolf that has been described as semiaquatic, and is placed at the top of its marine food web
