= List of cetaceans =

Known whale, dolphin, and porpoise species

Cetacea is an infraorder that comprises the 94 species of whales, dolphins, and porpoises. It is divided into toothed whales (Odontoceti) and baleen whales (Mysticeti), which diverged from each other in the Eocene some 50 million years ago (mya). Cetaceans are descended from land-dwelling hoofed mammals, and the now extinct archaeocetes represent the several transitional phases from terrestrial to completely aquatic. Cladistic analyses confirm their placement with even-toed ungulates in the order Cetartiodactyla.

Whale populations were drastically reduced in the 20th century from intensive whaling, which led to a moratorium on hunting by the International Whaling Commission in 1982. Smaller cetaceans are at risk of accidentally getting caught by fishing vessels using, namely, seine fishing, drift netting, or gill netting operations.

== Conventions ==
IUCN Red List categories
Conservation status
- EX: Extinct (0 species)
- EW: Extinct in the wild (0 species)
- CR: Critically endangered (5 species)
- EN: Endangered (11 species)
- VU: Vulnerable (7 species)
- NT: Near threatened (10 species)
- LC: Least concern (50 species)

Other categories
- DD: Data deficient (9 species)
- NE: Not evaluated (3 species)

The following is a list of currently existing (or, in the jargon of taxonomy) 'extant' species of the infraorder Cetacea (for extinct cetacean species, see the list of extinct cetaceans). The list is organized taxonomically into parvorders, superfamilies when applicable, families, subfamilies when applicable, genus, and then species. In tabular form, seven descriptors are given for each species: the common name; the scientific name; the IUCN Red List status; a global population estimate; a global map with its range; its weight with an image of its shape, and its size relative to a human; and a photograph.

Conservation status codes listed follow the IUCN Red List of Threatened Species (v. 2014.3; data current at 20 January 2015).

Where available, the global population estimate has been listed. When not cited or footnoted differently, these are from the IUCN Red List of Threatened Species (v. 2014.3; data current at 20 January 2015).

== Mysticeti: baleen whales ==
The baleen whales, also called whalebone whales or great whales, form the parvorder Mysticeti. Baleen whales are characterized by having baleen plates for filter feeding and two blowholes.

=== Family Balaenidae: right whales ===
The family Balaenidae, the right whales, contains two genera and four species. All right whales have no ventral grooves; a distinctive head shape with a strongly arched, narrow rostrum, bowed lower jaw; lower lips that enfold the sides and front of the rostrum; and long, narrow, elastic baleen plates (up to nine times longer than wide) with fine baleen fringes.

Genus Balaena Linnaeus, 1758 – one species
Common name	Scientific name	IUCN Red List status	Global population estimate	Range	Size	Picture
Bowhead whale	Balaena mysticetus Linnaeus, 1758	LC^{IUCN}	43,000	Bowhead whale range	60 t (66 short tons)	Bowhead whale
Genus Eubalaena Gray, 1864 – three species
Common name	Scientific name	IUCN Red List status	Global population estimate	Range	Size	Picture
North Atlantic right whale	Eubalaena glacialis Müller, 1776	CR^{IUCN}	350	North Atlantic right whale range	40–80 t (44–88 short tons)	North Atlantic right whale
North Pacific right whale	Eubalaena japonica Lacépède, 1818	EN^{IUCN}	404–2,108	North Pacific right whale range	60–80 t (66–88 short tons)	North Pacific right whale
Southern right whale	Eubalaena australis Desmoulins, 1822	LC^{IUCN}	13,600	Southern right whale range	40–80 t (44–88 short tons)	Southern right whale

=== Family Balaenopteridae: rorquals ===
Rorquals are the largest group of baleen whales, with eleven species in three genera. They include the largest animal that has ever lived, the blue whale. They take their name from a Norwegian word meaning "furrow whale"; all members of the family have a series of longitudinal folds of skin running from below the mouth back to the navel (except the sei whale, which has shorter grooves). They allow the mouth to expand immensely when feeding. All rorquals have these unique folds.

Genus Balaenoptera – nine species
Common name	Scientific name	Status	Population	Distribution	Size	Picture
Blue whale	Balaenoptera musculus Linnaeus, 1758	EN^{IUCN}	5,000–15,000	Blue whale range	50–150 t (55–165 short tons)	Blue whale
Bryde's whale	Balaenoptera brydei Olsen, 1913	LC^{IUCN}	90,000–100,000	Bryde's whale range	14–30 t (15–33 short tons)	Bryde's whale
Eden's whale (Note: The Society for Marine Mammalogy considers Eden's whale a smaller morph of the more widespread Bryde's whale based on current research.)	Balaenoptera edeni Anderson, 1879	LC^{IUCN}	Unknown	Eden's whale range	Unknown	Eden's whale (illustration)
Common minke whale	Balaenoptera acutorostrata Lacépède, 1804	LC^{IUCN}	200,000	Common minke whale range	2–4 t (2.2–4.4 short tons)	Common minke whale
Rice's whale	Balaenoptera ricei Rosel et al., 2021	CR^{IUCN}	30–100		~13.9 t (15.3 short tons)	
Fin whale	Balaenoptera physalus Linnaeus, 1758	VU^{IUCN}	100,000	Fin whale range	30–80 t (33–88 short tons)	Fin whale
Omura's whale	Balaenoptera omurai Wada et al., 2003	DD^{IUCN}	Unknown	Unknown	Unknown	Omura's whale
Sei whale	Balaenoptera borealis Lesson, 1828	EN^{IUCN}	80,000	Sei whale range	20–25 t (22–28 short tons)	Sei whales
Antarctic minke whale	Balaenoptera bonaerensis Burmeister, 1867	NT^{IUCN}	515,000	Antarctic minke whale range	6–10 t (6.6–11.0 short tons)	Antarctic minke whale
Genus Megaptera Gray, 1846 – one species
Common name	Scientific name	Status	Population	Distribution	Size	Picture
Humpback whale	Megaptera novaeangliae Borowski, 1781	LC^{IUCN}	135,000	Humpback whale range	25–30 t (28–33 short tons)	Humpback whale
Genus Eschrichtius Gray, 1864 – one species
Common name	Scientific name	Status	Population	Distribution	Size	Picture
Gray whale	Eschrichtius robustus Lilljeborg, 1861	LC^{IUCN}	21,000	Gray whale range	15–40 t (17–44 short tons)	Gray whale

=== Family Cetotheriidae: pygmy right whale ===
The pygmy right whale shares several characteristics with the right whales, with the exception of having a dorsal fin. Also, pygmy right whales' heads are no more than one quarter the size of their bodies, whereas the right whales' heads are about one-third the size of their bodies. The pygmy right whale is the only extant member of its family.

Genus Caperea Gray, 1864 – one species
Common name	Scientific name	Status	Population	Distribution	Size	Picture
Pygmy right whale	Caperea marginata Gray, 1846	LC^{IUCN}	Unknown	Pygmy right whale range	3–3.5 t (3.3–3.9 short tons)	Pygmy right whale

== Odontoceti: toothed whales ==
The toothed whales (parvorder Odontoceti), as the name suggests, are characterized by having teeth (rather than baleen). Toothed whales are active hunters, feeding on fish, squid, and in some cases other marine mammals.

=== Family Delphinidae: oceanic dolphins ===
Oceanic dolphins are the members of the family Delphinidae. As the name implies, they tend to be found in the open seas, unlike the river dolphins, although a few species such as the Irrawaddy dolphin are coastal or riverine.

The Delphinidae are characterized by having distinct beaks (unlike the Phocoenidae), two or more fused cervical vertebrae and 20 or more pairs of teeth in their upper jaws. None is more than 4 m long.

Genus Aethalodelphis Galatius et al., 2025– two species
Common name	Scientific name	Status	Population	Distribution	Size	Picture
Dusky dolphin	Aethalodelphis obscurus Gray, 1828	LC^{IUCN}	Unknown	Dusky dolphin range	100 kg (220 lb)	Dusky dolphin
Pacific white-sided dolphin	Aethalodelphis obliquidens Gill, 1865	LC^{IUCN}	1,000,000	Pacific white-sided dolphin range	85–150 kg (187–331 lb)	Pacific white-sided dolphin
Genus Cephalorhynchus Gray, 1846 – six species
Common name	Scientific name	Status	Population	Distribution	Size	Picture
Peale's dolphin	Cephalorhynchus australis Peale, 1848	LC^{IUCN}	Unknown (Note: Total population unknown but thought to be locally common – it is the most common dolphin found around the Falkland Islands)	Peale's dolphin range	115 kg (254 lb)	Peale's dolphin
Hourglass dolphin	Cephalorhynchus cruciger Quoy & Gaimard, 1824	LC^{IUCN}	140,000	Hourglass dolphin range	90–120 kg (200–260 lb)	Hourglass dolphin
Chilean dolphin	Cephalorhynchus eutropia Gray, 1846	NT^{IUCN}	Unknown (Note: Population estimated to be in the low thousands at the highest.)	Chilean dolphin range	60 kg (130 lb)	Chilean dolphin
Commerson's dolphin	Cephalorhynchus commersonii Lacépède, 1804	LC^{IUCN}	22,000	Commerson's dolphin range	35–60 kg (77–132 lb)	Commerson's dolphin
Heaviside's dolphin	Cephalorhynchus heavisidii Gray, 1828	NT^{IUCN}	Unknown	Heaviside's dolphin range	40–75 kg (88–165 lb)	Heaviside's dolphin
Hector's dolphin	Cephalorhynchus hectori Van Beneden, 1881	EN^{IUCN} (subspecies Maui dolphin CR^{IUCN})	7,381 (subspecies Maui dolphin 57–75 in 2016)	Hector's dolphin range (Maui dolphin in green)	35–60 kg (77–132 lb)	Hector's dolphin
Genus Delphinus – one species
Common name	Scientific name	Status	Population	Distribution	Size	Picture
Common dolphin	Delphinus delphis Linnaeus, 1758	LC^{IUCN}	Unknown (Note: There are estimated to be at least several million common dolphins worldwide, but several large portions of its range have not been surveyed.)		70–150 kg (150–330 lb)	Short-beaked common dolphin
Genus Feresa – one species
Common name	Scientific name	Status	Population	Distribution	Size	Picture
Pygmy killer whale	Feresa attenuata Gray, 1875	LC^{IUCN}	Unknown (Note: The only population estimate is of 38,900 individuals in the eastern tropical Pacific Ocean.)	Pygmy killer whale range	160–350 kg (350–770 lb)	Pygmy killer whale
Genus Globicephala – two species
Common name	Scientific name	Status	Population	Distribution	Size	Picture
Long-finned pilot whale	Globicephala melas Traill, 1809	LC^{IUCN}	Unknown (Note: Total population is not known. There are estimated to be in excess of 200,000 in the Southern Ocean. The North Atlantic population is not known.)	(green)	1.8–3.5 t (2.0–3.9 short tons)	Long-finned pilot whale
Short-finned pilot whale	Globicephala macrorhynchus Gray, 1846	LC^{IUCN}	Unknown (Note: Total population not known. There are 150,000 individuals in the eastern tropical Pacific Ocean. There are estimated to be more than 30,000 animals in the western Pacific, off the coast of Japan.)	(dark blue)	1–4 t (1.1–4.4 short tons)	Short-finned pilot whale
Genus Grampus – one species
Common name	Scientific name	Status	Population	Distribution	Size	Picture
Risso's dolphin	Grampus griseus G. Cuvier, 1812	LC^{IUCN}	Unknown (Note: The population around the continental shelf of the United States has been recorded to be in excess of 60,000. In the Pacific, a census recorded 175,000 individuals in eastern tropical waters and 85,000 in the west. No global estimate of population exists)	Risso's dolphin range	300 kg (660 lb)	Risso's dolphin
Genus Lagenodelphis – one species
Common name	Scientific name	Status	Population	Distribution	Size	Picture
Fraser's dolphin	Lagenodelphis hosei Fraser, 1956	LC^{IUCN}	Unknown (Note: There are estimated to be at least 320,000 Fraser's dolphins worldwide, but several large portions of its range have not been surveyed)	Fraser's dolphin range	209 kg (461 lb)	Fraser's dolphin
Genus Lagenorhynchus Gray, 1846 – one species
Common name	Scientific name	Status	Population	Distribution	Size	Picture
White-beaked dolphin	Lagenorhynchus albirostris Gray, 1846	LC^{IUCN}	100,000 (Note: Estimates of various stocks throughout the North Atlantic give an overall value into the high tens or low hundreds of thousands)	White-beaked dolphin range	180 kg (400 lb)	White-beaked dolphin
Genus Leucopleurus Gray, 1866 – one species
Common name	Scientific name	Status	Population	Distribution	Size	Picture
Atlantic white-sided dolphin	Leucopleurus acutus Gray, 1828	LC^{IUCN}	200,000–300,000	Atlantic white-sided dolphin range	235 kg (518 lb)	Atlantic white-sided dolphin
Genus Lissodelphis – two species
Common name	Scientific name	Status	Population	Distribution	Size	Picture
Northern right whale dolphin	Lissodelphis borealis Peale, 1848	LC^{IUCN}	400,000 (Note: Varying population estimates for areas around California and the North Pacific give a total of up to 400,000)	Northern right whale dolphin range	115 kg (254 lb)	Northern right whale dolphin
Southern right whale dolphin	Lissodelphis peronii Lacépède, 1804	LC^{IUCN}	Unknown (Note: Surveys suggest this is the most common dolphin off of Chilean waters)	Southern right whale dolphin range	60–100 kg (130–220 lb)	Southern right whale dolphin
Genus Orcaella Gray, 1866 – two species
Common name	Scientific name	Status	Population	Distribution	Size	Picture
Australian snubfin dolphin	Orcaella heinsohni Beasley, Robertson & Arnold, 2005	VU^{IUCN}	9,000–10,000	Australian snubfin dolphin range	130–145 kg (287–320 lb)	Australian snubfin dolphin
Irrawaddy dolphin	Orcaella brevirostris Gray, 1866	EN^{IUCN}	78–102	Irrawaddy dolphin range	130 kg (290 lb)	Irrawaddy dolphin
Genus Orcinus – one species
Common name	Scientific name	Status	Population	Distribution	Size	Picture
Orca	Orcinus orca Linnaeus, 1758	DD^{IUCN}	100,000 (Note: Local estimates include 70–80,000 in the Antarctic, 8,000 in the tropical Pacific (although tropical waters are not the orca's preferred environment, the sheer size of this area — 19 million square kilometres — means there are thousands of orcas), up to 2,000 off Japan, 1,500 off the cooler northeast Pacific and 1,500 off Norway)	Killer whale range	4.5 t (5.0 short tons)	Killer whale
Genus Peponocephala – one species
Common name	Scientific name	Status	Population	Distribution	Size	Picture
Melon-headed whale	Peponocephala electra Gray, 1846	LC^{IUCN}	Unknown (Note: Estimates for eastern tropical Pacific are 45,000 and another recent survey estimates population to be 1,200 for the eastern Sulu Sea, no global estimate is known)	Melon-headed whale range	225 kg (496 lb)	Melon-headed whale
Genus Pseudorca – one species
Common name	Scientific name	Status	Population	Distribution	Size	Picture
False killer whale	Pseudorca crassidens Owen, 1846	NT^{IUCN}	Unknown (Note: The total population is unknown. The eastern Pacific was estimated to have in excess of 40,000 individuals and is probably the home of the largest grouping)	False killer whale range	1.5–2 t (1.7–2.2 short tons)	False killer whale
Genus Sousa – four species
Common name	Scientific name	Status	Population	Distribution	Size	Picture
Atlantic humpback dolphin	Sousa teuszii Kükenthal, 1892	CR^{IUCN}	1,500	Atlantic humpback dolphin range	100–150 kg (220–330 lb)	Atlantic humpback dolphin
Australian humpback dolphin	Sousa sahulensis Jefferson & Rosenbaum, 2014	VU^{IUCN}	10,000	Australian humpback dolphin range	230–250 kg (510–550 lb)	Australian humpback dolphin
Indian Ocean humpback dolphin	Sousa plumbea Cuvier, 1829	EN^{IUCN}	Unknown (Note: Population estimated to be in the low tens of thousands)	Indian humpback dolphin range	Indian humpback dolphin size	Indian humpback dolphin
Indo-Pacific humpback dolphin	Sousa chinensis Osbeck, 1765	VU^{IUCN}	Unknown	Pacific humpback dolphin range	250–280 kg (550–620 lb)	Pacific humpback dolphin
Genus Sotalia – two species
Common name	Scientific name	Status	Population	Distribution	Size	Picture
Guiana dolphin	Sotalia guianensis Bénéden, 1864	NT^{IUCN}	Unknown	Costero range	35–45 kg (77–99 lb)	Costero
Tucuxi	Sotalia fluviatilis Gervais & Deville, 1853	EN^{IUCN}	Unknown	Tucuxi range	35–45 kg (77–99 lb)	Tucuxi
Genus Stenella Gray, 1866 – five species
Common name	Scientific name	Status	Population	Distribution	Size	Picture
Atlantic spotted dolphin	Stenella frontalis Cuvier, 1829	LC^{IUCN}	100,000	Atlantic spotted dolphin range	100 kg	Atlantic spotted dolphin
Clymene dolphin	Stenella clymene Gray, 1846	LC^{IUCN}	Unknown	Clymene dolphin range	75–80 kg (165–176 lb)	Clymene dolphin
Pantropical spotted dolphin	Stenella attenuata Gray, 1846	LC^{IUCN}	3,000,000	Pantropical spotted dolphin range	100 kg (220 lb)	Pantropical spotted dolphin
Spinner dolphin	Stenella longirostris Gray, 1828	LC^{IUCN}	Unknown	Spinner dolphin range	90 kg (200 lb)	Spinner dolphin
Striped dolphin	Stenella coeruleoalba Meyen, 1833	LC^{IUCN}	2,000,000	Striped dolphin range	100 kg (220 lb)	Striped dolphin
Genus Steno – one species
Common name	Scientific name	Status	Population	Distribution	Size	Picture
Rough-toothed dolphin	Steno bredanensis Lesson, 1828	LC^{IUCN}	150,000	Rough-toothed dolphin range	100–135 kg (220–298 lb)	Rough-toothed dolphin
Genus Tursiops – three species
Common name	Scientific name	Status	Population	Distribution	Size	Picture
Common bottlenose dolphin	Tursiops truncatus Montagu, 1821	LC^{IUCN}	600,000	Common bottlenose dolphin range	150–650 kg (330–1,430 lb)	Common bottlenose dolphin
Indo-Pacific bottlenose dolphin	Tursiops aduncus Ehrenberg, 1833	NT^{IUCN}	Unknown		230 kg (510 lb)	Indo-Pacific dolphin
Tamanend's bottlenose dolphin	Tursiops erebennus Cope, 1865	NE	Unknown	Unknown	Unknown	

=== Family Iniidae: river dolphins ===
This family contains one genus with two species.

Genus Inia – two species
Common name	Scientific name	Status	Population	Distribution	Size	Picture
Amazon river dolphin	Inia geoffrensis Blainville, 1817	EN^{IUCN}	Unknown	Amazon river dolphin range	150 kg (330 lb)	Amazon river dolphin
Araguaian river dolphin (Note: As of November 2021, the Araguaian river dolphin is not recognized by the Society for Marine Mammalogy, which cites small sample size)	Inia araguaiaensis Hrbek, Da Silva, Dutra, Farias, 2014	NE	Unknown	Araguaian river dolphin in blue	150 kg (330 lb)	Araguaian river dolphin

=== Family Kogiidae: dwarf and pygmy sperm whales ===
The dwarf and pygmy sperm whales resemble sperm whales, but are far smaller. They have blunt, squarish heads with narrow, underslung jaws; the flippers are set far forward, close to the head and their dorsal fins are set far back down the body.

Genus Kogia – two species
Common name	Scientific name	Status	Population	Distribution	Size	Picture
Dwarf sperm whale	Kogia sima Owen, 1866	LC^{IUCN}	Unknown (Note: No global population estimates have been made. One survey estimated a population of about 11,000 in the eastern Pacific)	Dwarf sperm whale range	250 kg (550 lb)	Dwarf sperm whale (reconstruction)
Pygmy sperm whale	Kogia breviceps Blainville, 1838	LC^{IUCN}	Unknown (Note: No global population estimates have been made. One survey estimated a population of about 11,000 in the eastern Pacific)	Pygmy sperm whale range	400 kg (880 lb)	Pygmy sperm whale

=== Family Lipotidae: baiji ===
The family Lipotidae contains only the baiji. DNA evidence suggests it separated from oceanic dolphins about 25 million years ago. The species was declared functionally extinct in 2006 after an expedition to estimate the population found none.

Genus Lipotes – one species
Common name	Scientific name	Status	Population	Distribution	Size	Picture
Baiji	Lipotes vexillifer Miller, 1918	CR^{IUCN}	0–13 (Note: A survey from November–December 2006 failed to find any individuals. Another survey, from 1997, counted only 13 individuals. In 1986, surveys estimated the number to be at about 300)	Baiji range	130 kg (290 lb)	Baiji

=== Family Monodontidae: narwhal and beluga ===
The Monodontidae lack dorsal fins, which have been replaced by tough, fibrous ridges just behind the midpoints of their bodies and are probably an adaptation to swimming under ice, as both do in their Arctic habitat. The flippers are small, rounded and tend to curl up at the ends in adulthood. All, or almost all, the cervical vertebrae are unfused, allowing their heads to be turned independently of their bodies.

Genus Delphinapterus – one species
Common name	Scientific name	Status	Population	Distribution	Size	Picture
Beluga	Delphinapterus leucas Pallas, 1776	LC^{IUCN}	136,000 (Note: There are estimated to be 40,000 individuals in the Beaufort Sea, 25,000 in Hudson Bay, 18,000 in the Bering Sea and 28,000 in the Canadian High Arctic. The population in the St. Lawrence estuary is estimated to be around 1000)	Beluga whale range	1.5 t (1.7 short tons)	Beluga whale
Genus Monodon – one species
Common name	Scientific name	Status	Population	Distribution	Size	Picture
Narwhal	Monodon monoceros Linnaeus, 1758	LC^{IUCN}	123,000	Narwhal range	900–1,500 kg (2,000–3,300 lb)	Narwhal pod

=== Family Phocoenidae: porpoises ===
Porpoises are small cetaceans of the family Phocoenidae. They are distinct from dolphins, although the word "porpoise" has been used to refer to any small dolphin, especially by sailors and fishermen. The most obvious visible differences between the two groups are that porpoises have a less pronounced beak, and have spade-shaped teeth as opposed to conical.

Porpoises, divided into seven species, live in all oceans. They span from species that live almost exclusively coastal and in rivers (finless porpoises) to species that are entirely oceanic (spectacled porpoise).

Genus Neophocaena – two or three species
Common name	Scientific name	Status	Population	Distribution	Size	Picture
Indo-Pacific finless porpoise	Neophocaena phocaenoides Cuvier, 1829	VU^{IUCN} (Note: There is not enough data to place finless porpoises on the endangered species list)	Unknown (Note: There are no good estimates of the animals' abundance. However a comparison of two surveys, one from the late 1970s and the other from 1999/2000 shows a decline in population and distribution.)	Indo-pacific finless porpoise range	30–45 kg (66–99 lb)	Indo-pacific finless porpoise
Yangtze finless porpoise	Neophocaena asiaeorientalis Cuvier, 1829	EN^{IUCN} (subspecies Yangtze finless porpoise CR^{IUCN}) (Note: In China, they are endangered. Their propensity for staying close to shore places them in great danger from fishing.)	Unknown (subspecies Yangtze finless porpoise 1,012 in 2018)	Narrow-ridged finless porpoise range (red color)	30–45 kg (66–99 lb)	Yangtze finless porpoise
Genus Phocoena – four species
Common name	Scientific name	Status	Population	Distribution	Size	Picture
Burmeister's porpoise	Phocoena spinipinnis Burmeister, 1865	NT^{IUCN}	Unknown (Note: There are no quantitative data on abundance.)	Burmeister's porpoise range	50–75 kg (110–165 lb)	Burmeister's porpoise
Harbour porpoise	Phocoena phocoena Linnaeus, 1758	LC^{IUCN}	700,000	Harbour porpoise range	75 kg (165 lb)	Harbour porpoise
Spectacled porpoise	Phocoena dioptrica Lahille, 1912	LC^{IUCN}	Unknown (Note: Nothing is known of the abundance of this porpoise. It was the most commonly encountered species during preliminary beach surveys undertaken on Tierra del Fuego.)	Spectacled porpoise range	60–84 kg (132–185 lb)	Subadult female spectacled porpoise
Vaquita	Phocoena sinus Norris & McFarland, 1958	CR^{IUCN}	12	Vaquita range	50 kg (110 lb)	Vaquita
Genus Phocoenoides – one species
Common name	Scientific name	Status	Population	Distribution	Size	Picture
Dall's porpoise	Phocoenoides dalli True, 1885	LC^{IUCN}	1,100,000 (Note: The most recent estimate for the North Pacific and Bering Sea is 1,186,000.)	Dall's porpoise range	130–200 kg (290–440 lb)	Dall's porpoise

=== Family Physeteridae: sperm whale ===
The sperm whale characteristically has a large, squarish head one-third the length of its body; the blowhole is slightly to the left hand side; the skin is usually wrinkled; and it has no teeth on the upper jaw.

Genus Physeter – one species
Common name	Scientific name	Status	Population	Distribution	Size	Picture
Sperm whale	Physeter macrocephalus Linnaeus, 1758	VU^{IUCN}	200,000–2,000,000 (Note: The total number of sperm whales throughout the world is unknown. Crude estimates, obtained by surveying small areas and extrapolating the result to all the world's oceans, range from 200,000 to 2,000,000 individuals)	Sperm whale range	25–50 t (28–55 short tons)	Sperm whale

=== Family Platanistidae: South Asian river dolphins ===
The Platanistidae were originally thought to hold only one species (the South Asian river dolphin), but, based on differences in skull structure, vertebrae and lipid composition, it was split into two separate species in the early 1970s, before being demoted back to subspecies in 1988. However, more recent studies support them being distinct species.

Genus Platanista – two species
Common name	Scientific name	Status	Population	Distribution	Size	Picture
Ganges river dolphin	Platanista gangetica (Lebeck, 1801)	EN^{IUCN}	3,500	(orange)	200 kg (440 lb)	
Indus river dolphin	Platanista minor Owen, 1853	EN^{IUCN}	1,450	(blue)	200 kg (440 lb)	

=== Family Pontoporiidae: La Plata dolphin ===
The La Plata dolphin is the only species of the family Pontoporiidae and genus Pontoporia. These dolphins are known for their long beak in relation to their relatively small body size. They have a small geographic range and are mainly found in the waters along the east coast of South America. La Plata dolphins are exclusively marine organisms, however, they are grouped with river dolphins due to the fact that they reside in the La Plata River which is a salt-water estuary. With their white or sometimes pale brown coloration, fishermen tend to call them "the white ghost", as they also tend to stray away from any human interaction.

Genus Pontoporia – one species
Common name	Scientific name	Status	Population	Distribution	Size	Picture
La Plata dolphin	Pontoporia blainvillei Gervais & d'Orbigny, 1844	VU^{IUCN}	4,000–4,500	La Plata dolphin range	50 kg (110 lb)	Beached La Plata dolphin

=== Family Ziphiidae: beaked whales ===
A beaked whale is any of at least 24 species of whale in the family Ziphiidae. Several species have only been described in the last two decades. Six genera have been identified. They possess a unique feeding mechanism among cetaceans known as suction feeding. They are characterized by having a lower jaw that extends at least to the tip of the upper jaw, a shallow or non-existent notch between the tail flukes, a dorsal fin set far backwards, three of four fused neck vertebrae, extensive skull asymmetry and two conspicuous throat grooves forming a 'V' pattern (which aid in sucking).

Genus Berardius – three species
Common name	Scientific name	Status	Population	Distribution	Size	Picture
Arnoux's beaked whale	Berardius arnuxii Duvernoy, 1851	LC^{IUCN}	Unknown (Note: Arnoux's beaked whales seem to be relatively abundant in Cook Strait during summer)	Arnoux's beaked whale range	6-10 t (6.6-11 short tons)	
Baird's beaked whale	Berardius bairdii Stejneger, 1883	LC^{IUCN}	Unknown (Note: Virtually nothing is known about the abundance of Baird's beaked whales, except they are not rare as was formerly thought)	Baird's beaked whale range	8-13 t (8.8-14 short tons)	
Sato's beaked whale	Berardius minimus Yamada et al., 2019	NT^{IUCN}	Unknown	North Pacific	c. ~2-3 t (2.2-3.3 short tons)	Berardius minimus illustration
Genus Tasmacetus – one species
Common name	Scientific name	Status	Population	Distribution	Size	Picture
Shepherd's beaked whale	Tasmacetus shepherdi Oliver, 1937	DD^{IUCN}	Unknown (Note: Nothing is known about the relative abundance of this species or its population composition)	Shepherd's beaked whale range	2-3.2 t (2.2-3.5 short tons)	
Genus Ziphius – one species
Common name	Scientific name	Status	Population	Distribution	Size	Picture
Cuvier's beaked whale	Ziphius cavirostris G. Cuvier, 1823	LC^{IUCN}	100,000 (Note: Because of the difficulty of identifying the species the total global population is unknown)	Cuvier's beaked whale range	2–3 t (2.2–3.3 short tons)	
Subfamily Hyperoodontinae – three genera, 17 species
Genus Hyperoodon – two species
Common name	Scientific name	Status	Population	Distribution	Size	Picture
Northern bottlenose whale	Hyperoodon ampullatus Forster, 1770	NT^{IUCN}	10,000 (Note: Total population is unknown but likely to be of the order of 10,000)	Northern bottlenose whale range	5–10 t (5.5–11.0 short tons)	
Southern bottlenose whale	Hyperoodon planifrons Flower, 1882	LC^{IUCN}	500,000	Southern bottlenose range	6 t (6.6 short tons)	
Genus Indopacetus – one species
Common name	Scientific name	Status	Population	Distribution	Size	Picture
Tropical bottlenose whale	Indopacetus pacificus Longman, 1926	LC^{IUCN}	Unknown (Note: A 2002 survey estimates there are 766 animals around Hawaii. No other population estimates exist for other locales)	Tropical bottlenose whale range	3.5–4 t (3.9–4.4 short tons)	
Genus Mesoplodon Gervais, 1850 – 15 species
Common name	Scientific name	Status	Population	Distribution	Size	Picture
Andrews' beaked whale	Mesoplodon bowdoini Andrews, 1908	DD^{IUCN}	Unknown	Andrew's beaked whale range	1 t (1.1 short tons)	
Blainville's beaked whale	Mesoplodon densirostris Blainville, 1817	LC^{IUCN}	Unknown	Blainville's beaked whale range	0.8-1 t (0.9-1.1 short tons)	
Deraniyagala's beaked whale	Mesoplodon hotaula P. E. P. Deraniyagala, 1963	DD^{IUCN}	Unknown	Indian and South Pacific	4–5 m (13–16 ft)	[cetacean needed]
Gervais' beaked whale	Mesoplodon europaeus Gervais, 1855	LC^{IUCN}	Unknown	Gervais' beaked whale range	0.8-1.2 t (0.9-1.3 short tons)	
Ginkgo-toothed beaked whale	Mesoplodon ginkgodens Nishiwaki & Kamiya, 1958	DD^{IUCN}	Unknown	Ginkgo-toothed beaked whale range	1-2 t (1.1-2.2 short tons)	Ginkgo-toothed beaked whale (illustration)
Gray's beaked whale	Mesoplodon grayi von Haast, 1876	LC^{IUCN}	Unknown	Gray's beaked whale range	1.5 t (1.7 short tons)	Gray's beaked whale
Hector's beaked whale	Mesoplodon hectori Gray, 1871	DD^{IUCN}	Unknown	Hector's beaked whale range	1 t (1.1 short tons)	Hector's beaked whale (illustration)
Hubbs' beaked whale	Mesoplodon carlhubbsi Moore, 1963	DD^{IUCN}	Unknown	Hubb's beaked whale range	1.4 t (1.5 short tons)	
Perrin's beaked whale	Mesoplodon perrini Dalebout, Mead, Baker, Baker, & van Helding, 2002	EN^{IUCN}	500–1,164	North Pacific	1.3–1.5 t (1.4–1.7 short tons)	Mesoplodon perrini, oil on paper
Pygmy beaked whale	Mesoplodon peruvianus Reyes, Mead, and Van Waerebeek, 1991	LC^{IUCN}	Unknown	Pygmy beaked whale range	800 kg (1,800 lb)	Mesoplodon peruvianus, oil on paper
Ramari's beaked whale	Mesoplodon eueu Carroll et al, 2021	DD^{IUCN}	Unknown	(red circle)	Unknown	
Sowerby's beaked whale	Mesoplodon bidens Sowerby, 1804	LC^{IUCN}	Unknown	Sowerby's beaked whale range	1–1.3 t (1.1–1.4 short tons)	
Spade-toothed whale	Mesoplodon traversii, syn. Mesoplodon bahamondi Gray, 1874	DD^{IUCN}	Unknown	Spade-toothed whale range	1.2 t (1.3 short tons)	
Stejneger's beaked whale	Mesoplodon stejnegeri True, 1885	NT^{IUCN}	Unknown	Stejneger's beaked whale range	1.5 t (1.7 short tons)	
Strap-toothed whale	Mesoplodon layardii Gray, 1865	LC^{IUCN}	Unknown	Strap-toothed whale range	2 t (2.2 short tons)	
True's beaked whale	Mesoplodon mirus True, 1913	LC^{IUCN}	Unknown	(North Atlantic only; map includes range of M. eueu in Indian Ocean)	1.4 t (1.5 short tons)	

== See also ==
- List of mammals
- List of individual cetaceans
- Evolution of cetaceans
- Archaeoceti
- List of whale vocalizations
- List of marine mammal species
- Mammal classification
