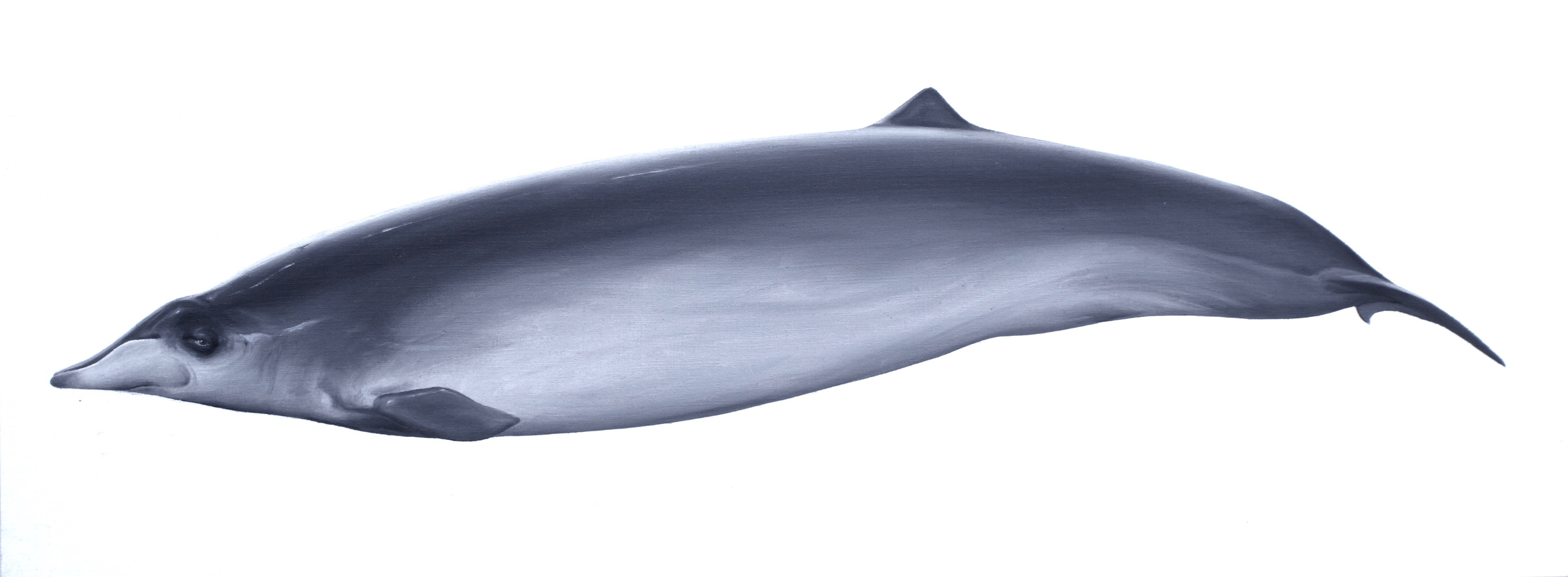

- Size compared to an average human

Conservation status
- Least Concern (IUCN 3.1)
- CITES Appendix II

Scientific classification
- Kingdom: Animalia
- Phylum: Chordata
- Class: Mammalia
- Infraclass: Placentalia
- Order: Artiodactyla
- Infraorder: Cetacea
- Family: Ziphiidae
- Genus: Mesoplodon
- Species: M. peruvianus

Binomial name
- Mesoplodon peruvianus Reyes, Mead, and Van Waerebeek, 1991
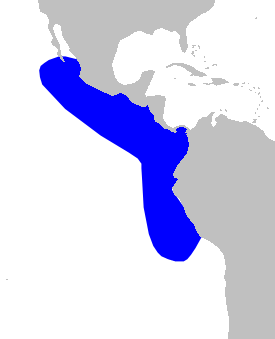
- Pygmy beaked whale range

= Pygmy beaked whale =

Species of mammal

The pygmy beaked whale (Mesoplodon peruvianus), also known as the bandolero beaked whale, Peruvian beaked whale and lesser beaked whale, is the smallest of the mesoplodonts and one of the newest discoveries. There were at least two dozen sightings of an unknown beaked whale named Mesoplodon sp. A before the initial classification, and those are now believed to be synonymous with the species. The species was formally described in 1991, based on ten specimens obtained from Peru between 1976 and 1989, including a 3.72 m (12.2 ft) adult male as the type specimen. A specimen that stranded at Paracas, Peru in 1955 (first tentatively identified as Andrews' beaked whale) has since been identified as a pygmy beaked whale. Since 1987, there have been an additional 40 sightings of the species, for a total of 65 (as of 2001).

== Description ==
Pygmy beaked whales are the smallest beaked whale species, with adults measuring 3.4 (11 ft) to 4.1 m (13 ft) while calves are around 1.6 m (5.2 ft). The body of this species is visibly spindle-shaped, with an unusually thick tailstock compared to its congeners, as well as broad flukes. The melon is somewhat bulbous and slopes into a short beak. The dorsal fin is low and triangular with a wide base, inconspicuous depressions beneath the pectoral fins ("flipper pockets"), and relatively short throat grooves. The adult males develop a strongly arched jawline and a pair of small teeth that protrude above the gums near the apex of the lower jaw.

Adult males are dark gray, dark brown or blackish above and often lighter gray to off-white ventrally, particularly on the lower jaw, throat and belly, though at least one male was completely blackish with no prominent countershading. The males typically possess a characteristic pale to cream-colored swathe extending from just behind the blowhole down the flanks and ending before the dorsal fin, though the extent and prominence of the swathe may vary individually or possibly geographically, with Peruvian males often appearing less boldly patterned than more northern ones. They are often moderately to heavily scarred from intraspecific fights with other males, often most concentrated on the flanks and underside of the tailstock.

Females and calves have much simpler coloration, ranging from dark grey or brown dorsally and whitish to cream-colored ventrally with a distinctive dark eye patch. Both sexes may also sport irregular to circular white markings that are likely healed wounds from cookiecutter sharks.

== Habitat and distribution ==
This beaked whale has been recorded in the eastern tropical Pacific between Baja California and Peru through sightings and strandings. Further strandings have been recorded in Chile (29°15′S 71°26′W) and Monterey Bay (a 3.6 m (11.8 ft) female found at Salinas State Beach), and a fresh specimen in Humboldt County, CA in 1995, 2001, and 2012, respectively, extending the species' range far to the north and south. Another specimen washed up in New Zealand, although this stranding is considered extralimital.

== Behavior and ecology ==
=== Social behavior ===
Little is known about the group behaviors of this whale, and small groups have been seen. Males tend to sport prominent white scarring, presumably the result of males using their teeth in intraspecific fights, like other Mesoplodon species.

=== Food and foraging ===
Recorded stomach contents include fish (Patchwork lanternfish, Ophidiids and Nemipterids), squid (Gonatus antarcticus, Teuthowenia sp., Histioteuthis sp.), and crustaceans (Acanthephyra sp.). It is presumed to be a deep-diving, echolocating suction-feeder like other Mesoplodon species, creating a negative pressure cavity in its mouth by retracting its tongue and expanding the throat grooves, powerfully drawing prey inside like a biological vacuum. Dive times of 15-30 minutes are known, and it is presumed that they forage at depths greater than 500m.

=== Parasites ===
Many parasites have been recorded in this whale's organs, including trematodes (Nasitrema globicephalae, Campula sp.), nematodes (Anisakis sp.), and cestodes (Phyllobothrium delphini, Tetrabothrius forsteri).

== Conservation ==
The pygmy beaked whale may be vulnerable to being entangled in gillnets. It is one of the only beaked whales that is frequently documented as bycatch in gillnet fisheries, especially in Peru. Marine debris may also be a threat to this whale, as some individuals have been found with plastic in their digestive systems. Despite being somewhat regularly recorded in the eastern Tropical Pacific and coastal Peru, the species is still considered naturally rare or just poorly known throughout its range.

== Specimens ==
- MNZ MM002142, collected from Oaro overbridge, south of Kaikōura, New Zealand, 19 October 1993.

== See also ==
- List of cetaceans

== Sources ==
- Encyclopedia of Marine Mammals. Edited by William F. Perrin, Bernd Wursig, and J.G.M Thewissen. Academic Press, 2002. ISBN 0-12-551340-2
- Sea Mammals of the World. Written by Randall R. Reeves, Brent S. Steward, Phillip J. Clapham, and James A. Owell. A & C Black, London, 2002. ISBN 0-7136-6334-0
