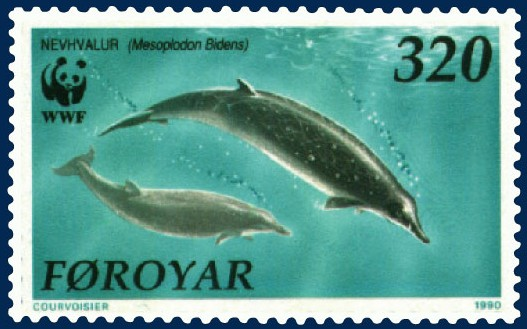
- Sowerby's beaked whale (on Faroese stamp)

Scientific classification
- Kingdom: Animalia
- Phylum: Chordata
- Class: Mammalia
- Order: Artiodactyla
- Infraorder: Cetacea
- Family: Ziphiidae
- Subfamily: Hyperoodontinae
- Genus: Mesoplodon; Gervais, 1850

Type species
- Delphinus sowerbensis de Blainville, 1817

Species
- 16, See text.

= Mesoplodon =

Genus of beaked whales

Mesoplodont whales are 16 species of toothed whale in the genus Mesoplodon, making it the largest genus in the cetacean order. Two species were described as recently as 1991 (pygmy beaked whale) and 2002 (Perrin's beaked whale), and marine biologists predict the discovery of more species in the future. A new species was described in 2021. They are the most poorly known group of large mammals. The generic name "mesoplodon" comes from the Greek meso- (middle) - hopla (arms) - odon (teeth), and may be translated as 'armed with a tooth in the centre of the jaw'.

== Physical description ==
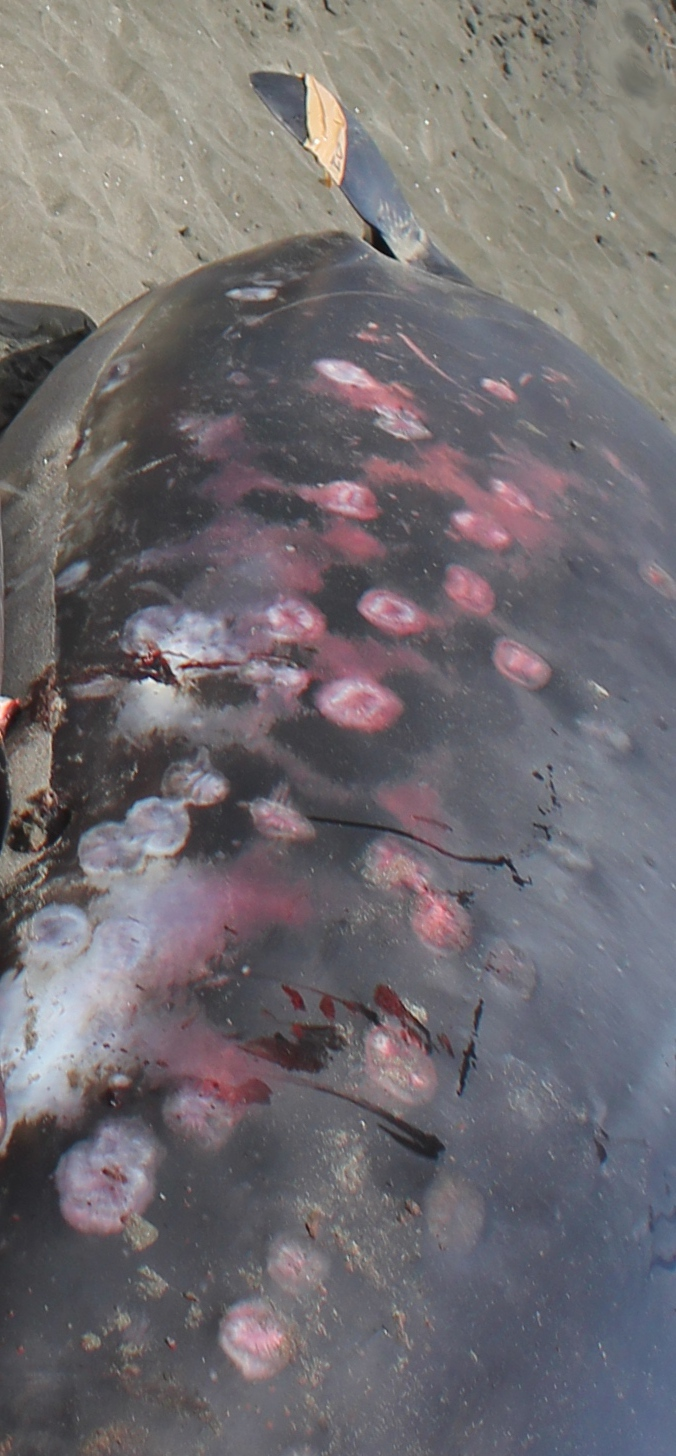
Round scars from cookiecutter shark bites can be seen on the flank of this stranded Gray's beaked whale.

Mesoplodont beaked whales are small whales, 3.9 m (13 ft) (pygmy beaked whale) to 6.2 m (20 ft) (strap-toothed whale) in length, even compared with closely related whales such as the bottlenose whales and giant beaked whales. The spindle-shaped body has a small dorsal fin and short and narrow flippers. The head is small and tapered and has a semicircular blow hole that is sometimes asymmetric. The beak, which vary in length between species, blends with the small melon without a crease.

Sexual dimorphism is poorly known, but the females tend to be the same size or larger than males at least in some species. The males typically have a bolder coloration and a unique dentition. The males of most species are covered in scars from the teeth of other males.

The lower jaw often forms a huge arch in some species, sometimes extending above the rostrum in a shape comparable to a playground slide. Every species has large (sometimes tusk-like) teeth of variable size, shape, and position.

Both sexes often have bites from cookie-cutter sharks. The dorsal fin is rather small and located between two-thirds and three-quarters down the back of the animal. Information on longevity and lactation is non-existent, and information on gestation is nearly so.

== Behavior ==
Most species are very rarely observed, and little is known about their behavior. They are typically found in groups, possibly segregated between sexes. Some species are so uncommon, they have yet to be observed alive. On the surface, they are typically very slow swimmers and do not make obvious blows. They have never been observed raising their flukes above the water. They are all very deep divers, and many feed entirely on squid.

== Conservation ==
The mesoplodonts are completely unknown as far as population estimates are concerned. They have been hunted occasionally by the Japanese, but never directly. They are also accidentally captured in drift nets. It is not known what effect this has on the population.

== Species ==
- Andrews' beaked whale (M. bowdoini) Andrews, 1908
- Blainville's beaked whale (M. densirostris) Blainville, 1817
- Deraniyagala's beaked whale (M. hotaula) Deraniyagala, 1963
- Gervais's beaked whale (M. europaeus) Gervais, 1855
- Ginkgo-toothed beaked whale (M. ginkgodens) Nishiwaki and Kamiya, 1958
- Gray's beaked whale (M. grayi) von Haast, 1876
- Hector's beaked whale (M. hectori) Gray, 1871
- Hubbs' beaked whale (M. carlhubbsi) Moore, 1963
- Perrin's beaked whale (M. perrini) Dalebout, Mead, Baker, Baker & van Helden, 2002
- Pygmy beaked whale (M. peruvianus) Reyes, Mead, and Van Waerebeek, 1991
- Sowerby's beaked whale (M. bidens) Sowerby, 1804
- Spade-toothed whale (M. traversii) Gray, 1874
- Stejneger's beaked whale (M. stejnegeri) True, 1885
- Strap-toothed whale (M. layardii) Gray, 1865
- True's beaked whale (M. mirus) True, 1913
- Ramari's beaked whale (M. eueu) Carroll et al, 2021

Longman's beaked whale (Indopacetus pacificus, also known as the Indo-Pacific beaked whale or the tropical bottlenose whale) was originally assigned to Mesoplodon, but Joseph Curtis Moore placed it in its own genus, Indopacetus, a taxonomic assignment which has been followed by all researchers.

Four extinct species of Mesoplodon are known: M. longirostris, M. posti, M. slangkopi, and M. tumidirostris.

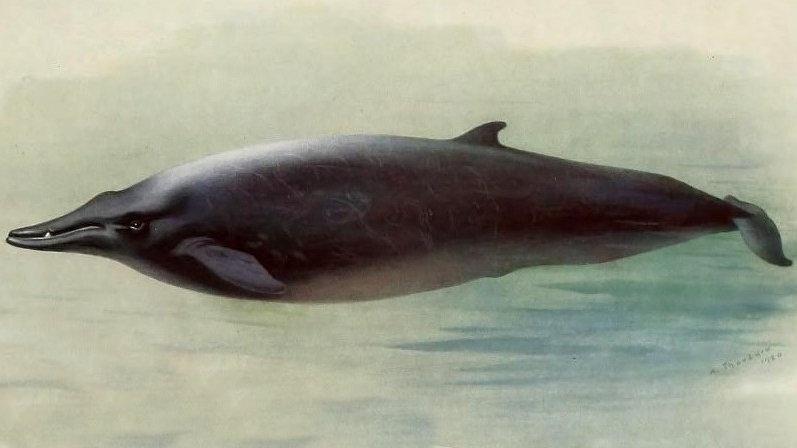
Sowerby's beaked whale, Mesoplodon bidens; a male, with conspicuous teeth in the lower jaw

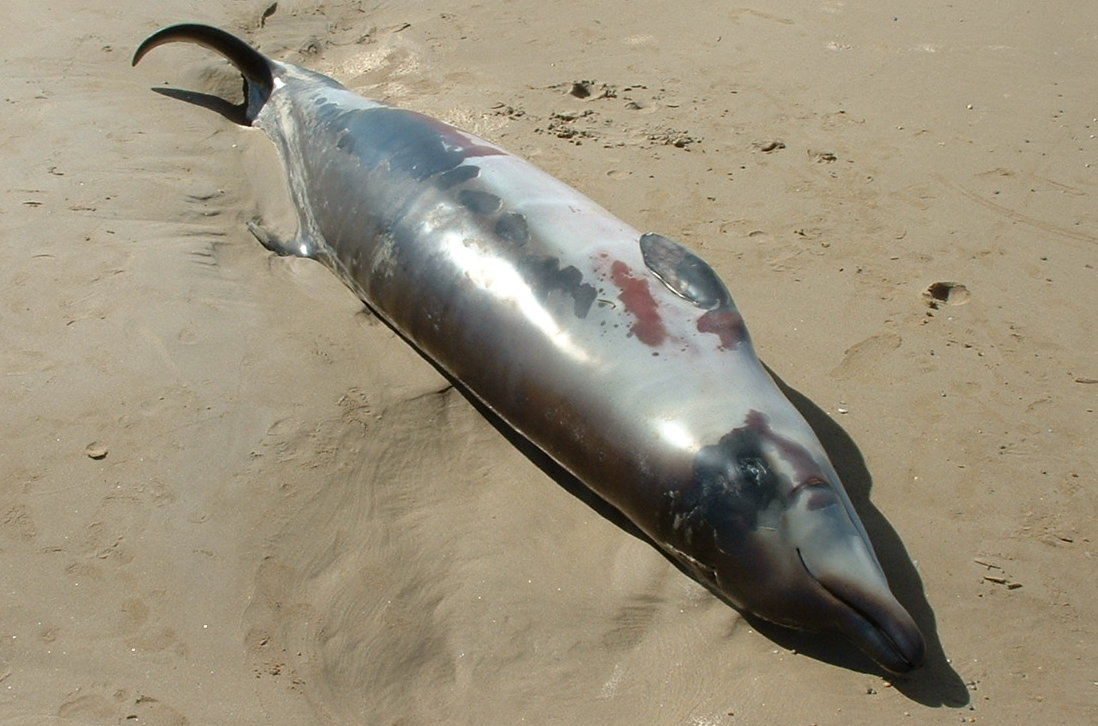
A stranded newborn Andrews' beaked whale, M. bowdoini

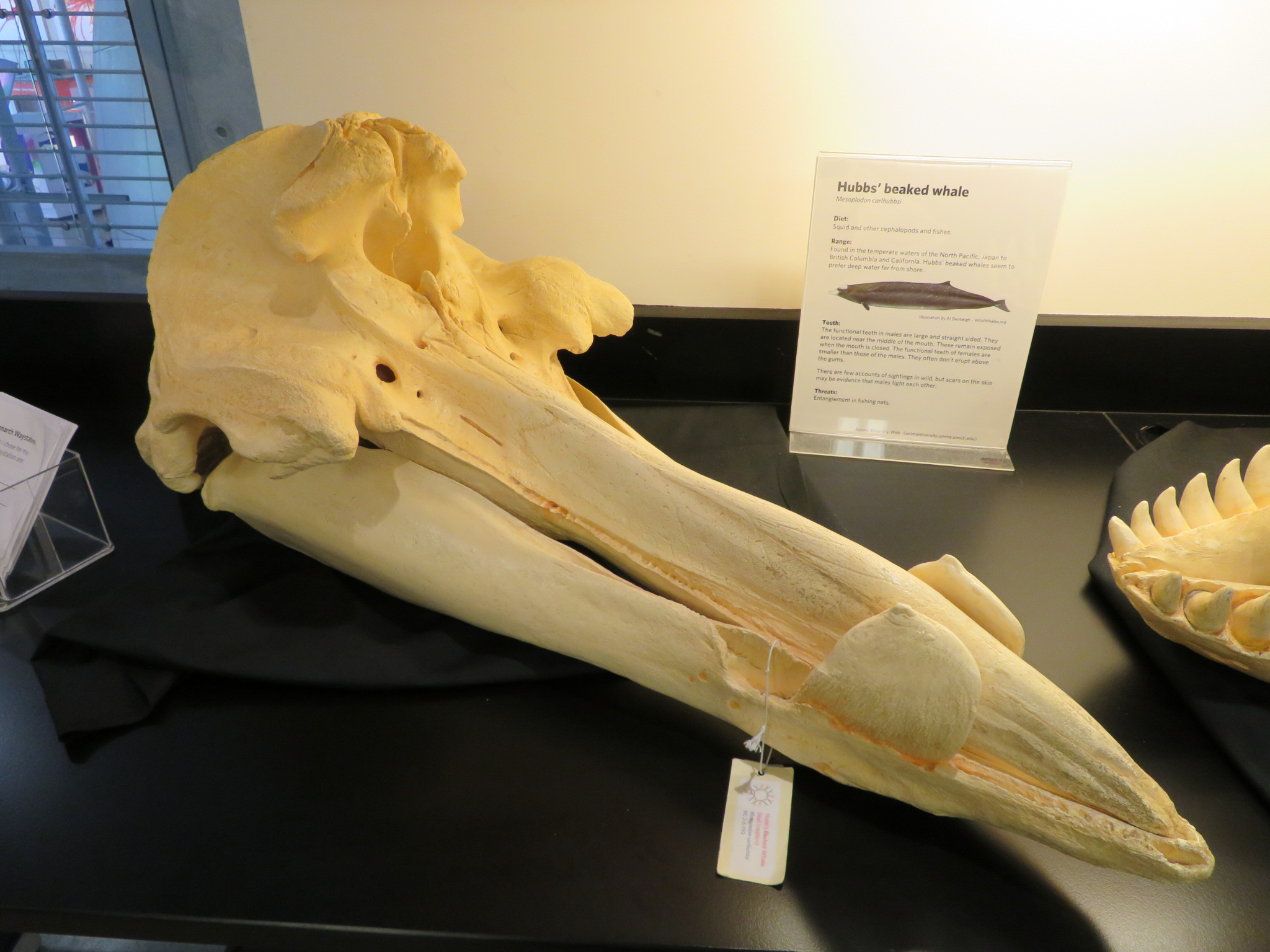
Skull of a Hubbs' beaked whale (M. carlhubbsi)

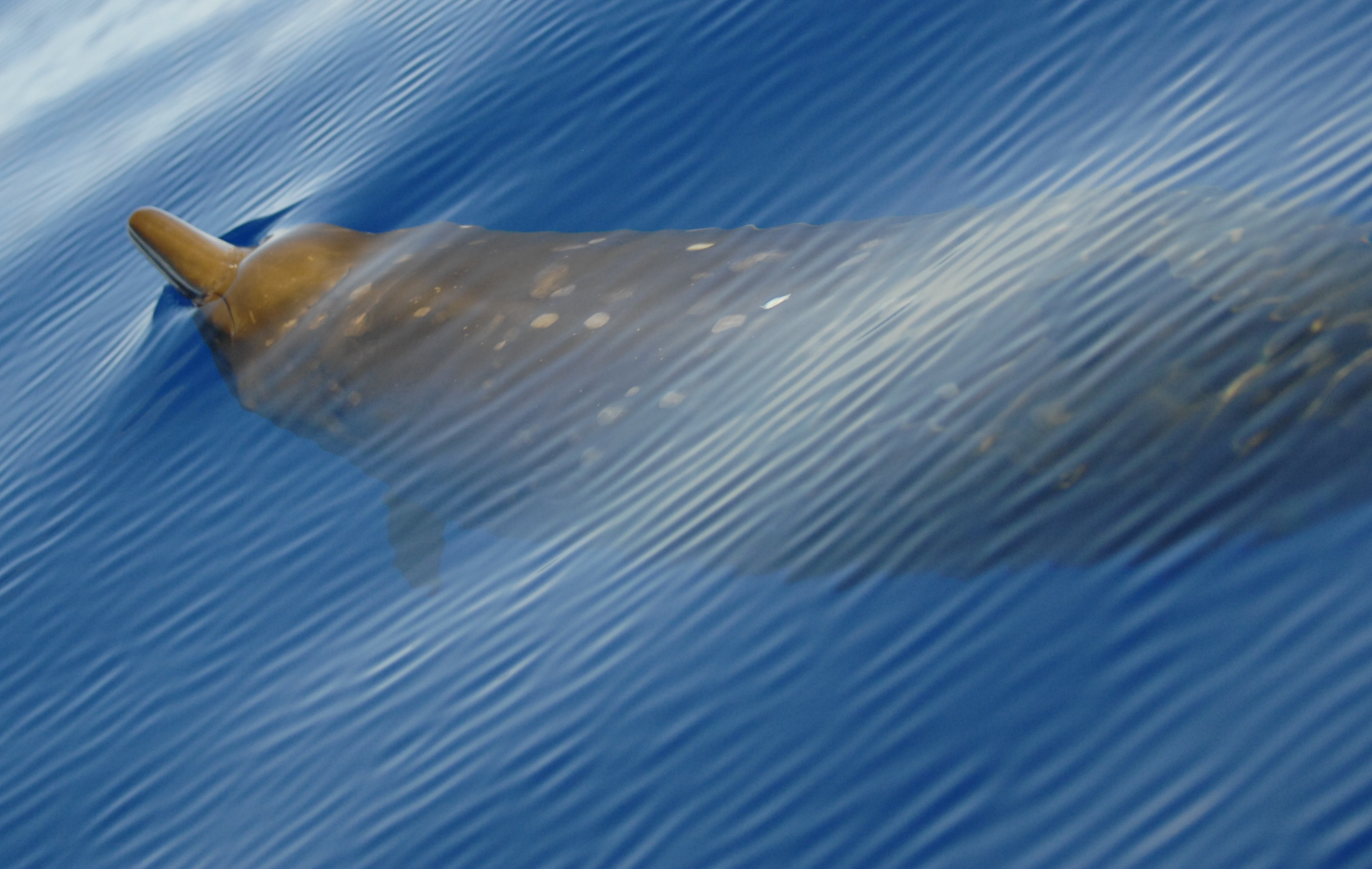
Blainville's beaked whale (M. densirostris) in the Bahamas

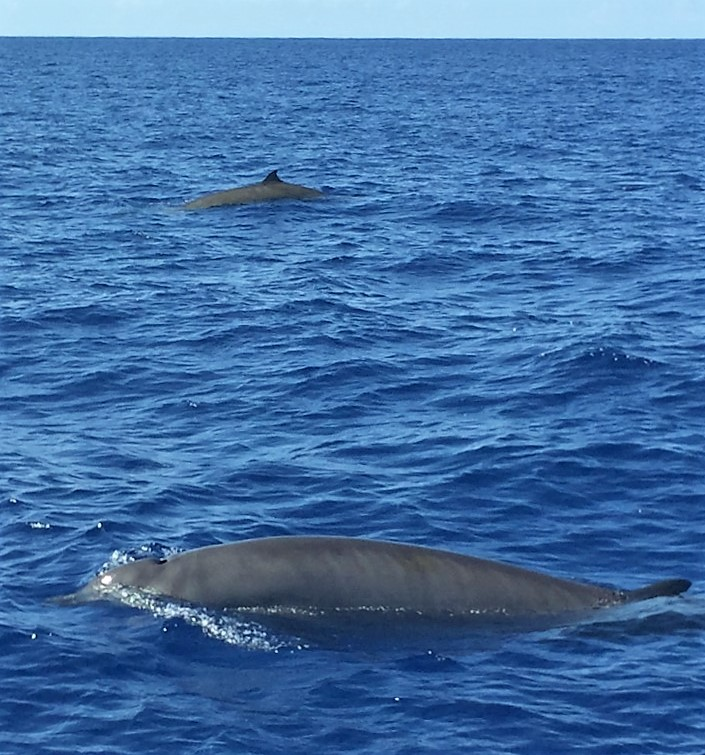
Gervais's beaked whale (M. europaeus) in the Gulf Stream off North Carolina

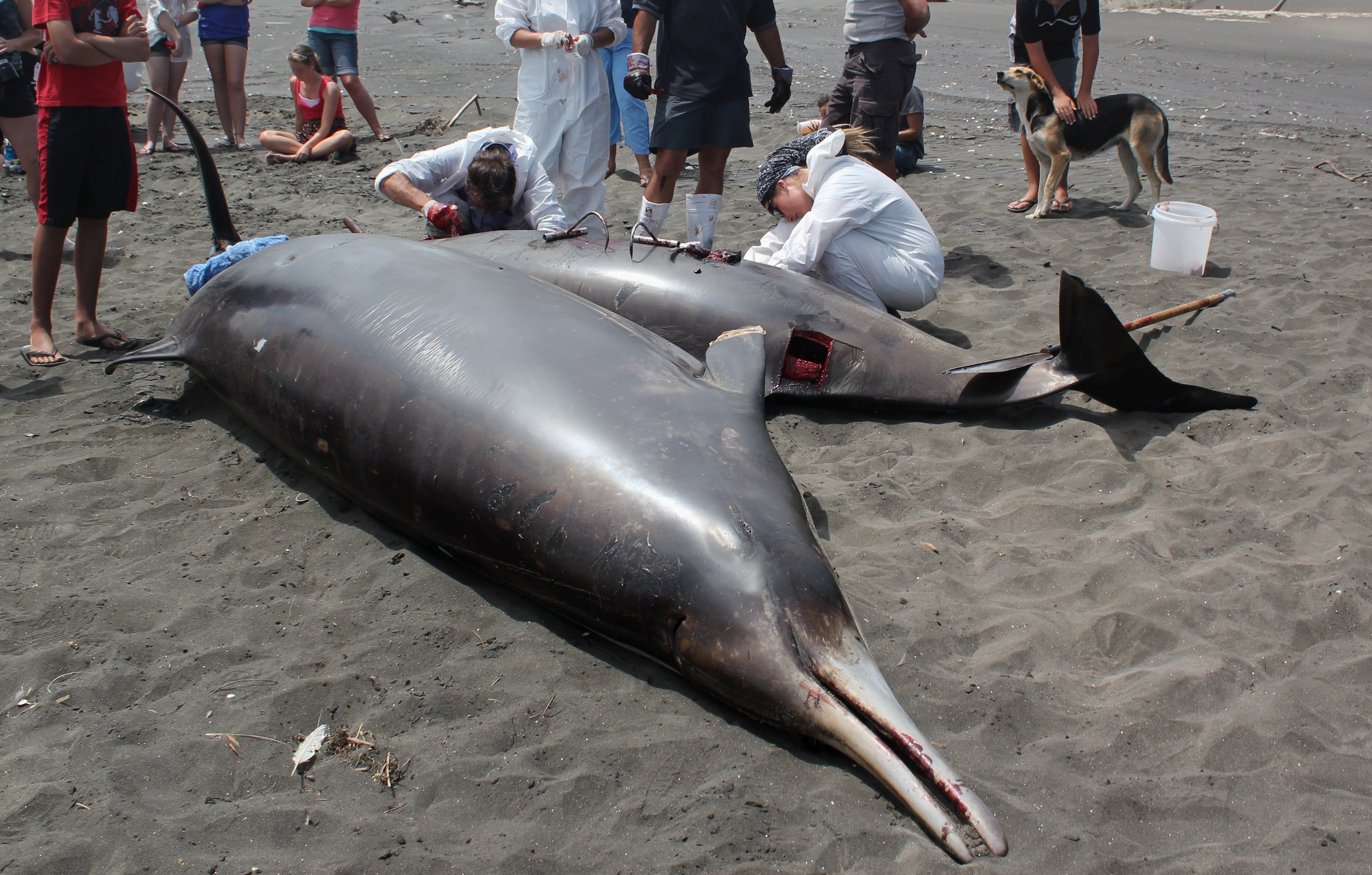
Autopsy of a stranded Gray's beaked whale (M. grayi)

True's beaked whale (M. mirus) off the Azores

The Spade-toothed whale (M. traversii) was only morphologically described in 2012.
