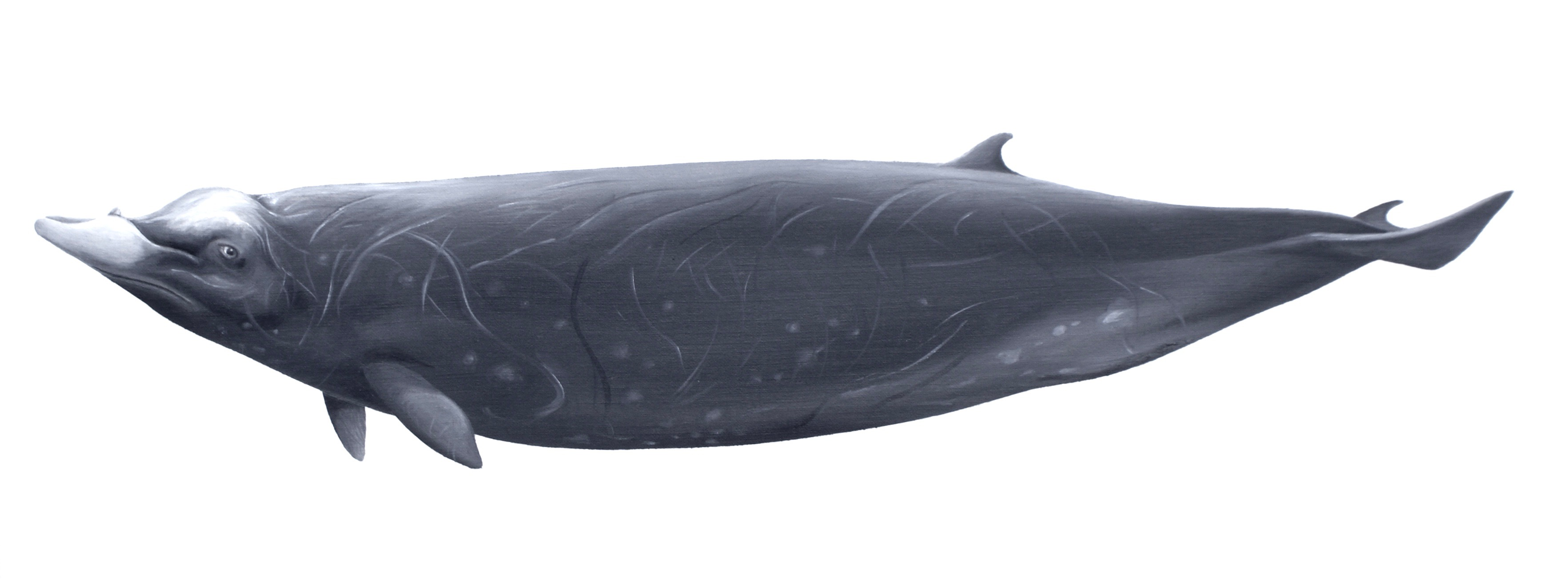

- Size compared to an average human

Conservation status
- Data Deficient (IUCN 3.1)

- Vulnerable (NatureServe)
- CITES Appendix II

Scientific classification
- Kingdom: Animalia
- Phylum: Chordata
- Class: Mammalia
- Order: Artiodactyla
- Infraorder: Cetacea
- Family: Ziphiidae
- Genus: Mesoplodon
- Species: M. carlhubbsi

Binomial name
- Mesoplodon carlhubbsi Moore, 1963
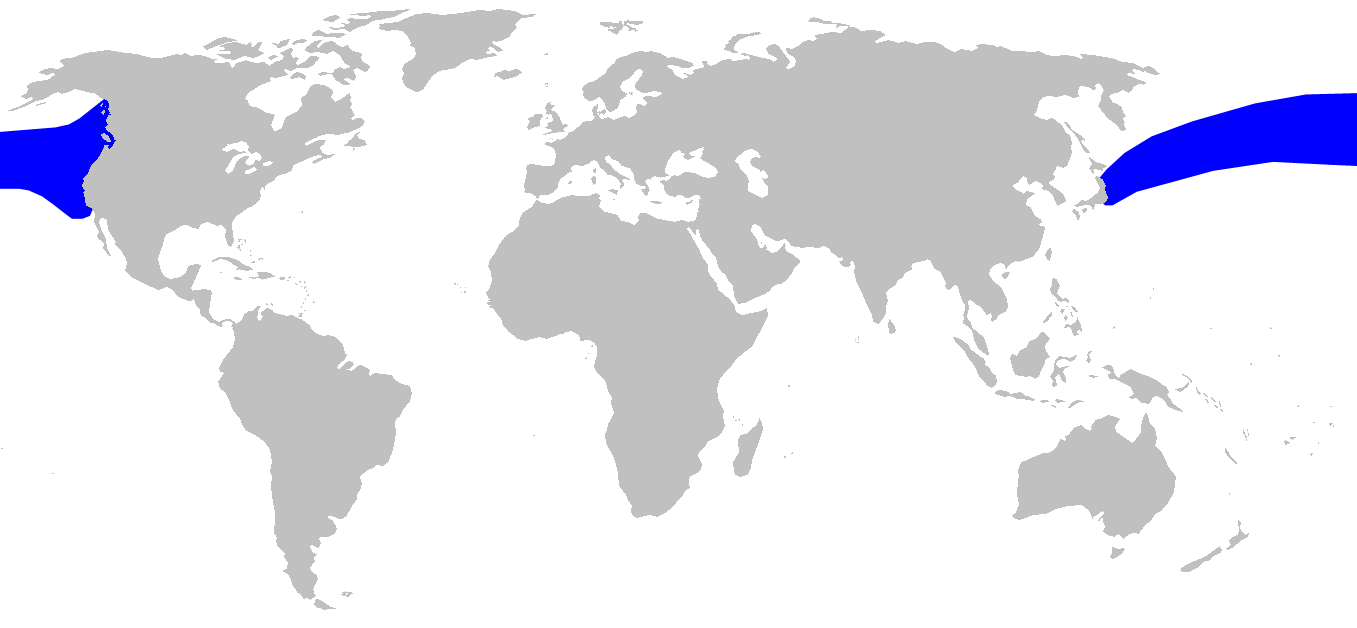
- Hubb's beaked whale range

= Hubbs' beaked whale =

Species of mammal

Hubbs' beaked whale (Mesoplodon carlhubbsi) was initially thought to be an Andrews' beaked whale when discovered by ichthyologist Carl Hubbs; however, it was named in his honor when it was discovered to be a new species. This species has the typical dentition found in the genus, but its main outstanding features are a white "cap" on the head and very extensive scarring. The species is known from 31 strandings, a few at-sea sightings, and observations of two stranded whales that were kept in captivity for 16–25 days.

== Taxonomy ==
Carl Leavitt Hubbs, a noted American ichthyologist, published a description of a whale found alive in the surf near his office at the Scripps Institution of Oceanography in La Jolla, California, in 1945. He believed it to be Andrews' beaked whale (a very similar species found only in the Southern Hemisphere), but Joseph Curtis Moore, an expert on beaked whales at Chicago's Field Museum, reassigned it to a new species, Mesoplodon carlhubbsi, in 1963, naming it in his honor.

== Description ==
Hubbs' beaked whales are a medium-sized ziphiids, reaching up to 5.3 m (17.4 ft) in length and around 1-1.5 t. Males are a uniform dark gray to black with a striking white cap on the somewhat bulbous melon and a relatively stubby, white-tipped beak. They have an arched jawline with a single pair of laterally-compressed, tusk-like teeth that can project slightly higher than the beak when the mouth is closed. Males are covered in very extensive light to white scarring from male-male combat, often concentrated ventrally or on the sides. Females are medium to light grey dorsally with a lighter underside. They lack the conspicuous white caps of males, though the melons are often pale and less prominent. The beaks are less arched and whitish, and the teeth do not erupt. Calves are dark to dark brown dorsally and lighter ventrally with a pale face, dark rostrum and dark eye patch. They have small, narrow flippers that fit into slight depressions known as "flipper pockets", a small dorsal fin set far back on the body, and relatively wide tail flukes with no prominent median notch. Light-colored cookiecutter shark wounds are found in both sexes throughout the body, often concentrated ventrally around the genital region and even flukes.

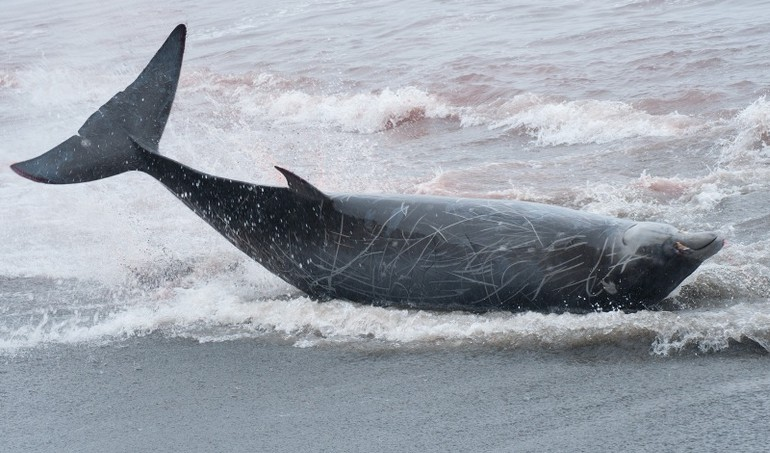
A stranded male in Japan.

== Population and distribution ==
It is estimated that M. carlhubbsi is distributed along the coast of Japan and the Pacific coast of North America. The distribution along North America extends from San Diego to Prince Rupert. The southern limit is unknown but the northern limit is Vancouver Island. The distribution is probably not directly related to the character of the water mass but rather follows the distribution of the prey species it feeds on. M. carlhubbsi follows prey items in intermediate and deep-water masses, rather than surface water masses.

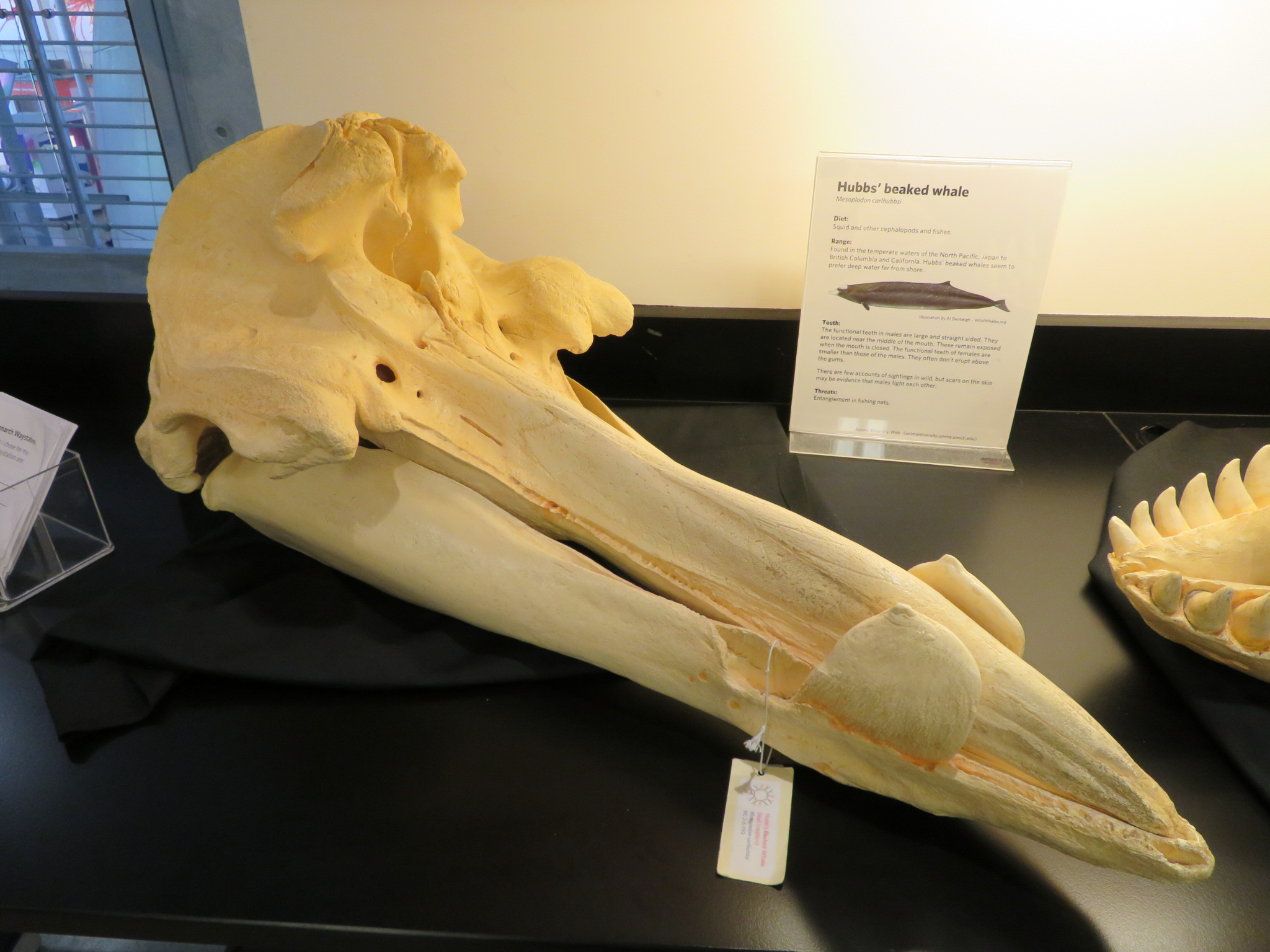
Hubbs' beaked whale skull located at the California Academy of Sciences San Francisco.

== Behavior ==
=== Social behavior ===
Pod size and behavior is unknown for this species. The extensive scarring observed on males suggests aggressive male–male competition, possibly involving jousting behavior in which one or both teeth are used to inflict wounds on opponents. This combat likely allows males to physically exclude rivals and may indicate a polygynous or harem-like mating system based on dominance.

=== Food and feeding ===
Stomach contents of stranded M. carlhubbsi contained squid beaks, fish otoliths, and fish bones. Prey species included Gonatus sp., Chauliodus macouni, Icichthys lockingtoni, and Poromitra crassiceps. Other known prey are Octopoteuthis deletron, Lampanyctus regalis, Stigmatoteuthis dofleni and Onychoteuthis borealijaponica, which seems to be an important prey item. Like other Mesoplodon species, it is presumed to be a deep-diving, echolocating suction-feeder, creating a negative pressure cavity in its mouth by retracting its tongue and expanding the throat grooves, powerfully drawing prey inside like a vacuum.

=== Reproduction ===
Researchers assume calving takes place in the summer based on lengths of neonatal specimens, gestational period, and fetal growth in most cetaceans. On October 3 they found a 90 cm (35 in) fetus which had about 160 cm (63 in) of growth before birth which gives an estimated time of birth of about mid-May. Calves are about 2.5 m (8.2 ft) at birth A few acoustic and other behavioral observations were made of stranded M. carlhubbsi when they were held briefly in captivity. They are estimated to be physically mature at around 4.9 m to 5 m. A stereotyped beaked whale echolocation pulse type (termed BW37V) is thought to be made by this species but has not been linked to a sighting, so this attribution is considered provisional.

== Conservation ==
As of 2020, the IUCN Red List classifies M. carlhubbsi as Data Deficient but identifies fishing gear, anthropogenic noise, and climate change as potential threats to the species. Small numbers of individuals have been taken by small-scale whaling operations in Japanese coastal waters. Like other beaked whale species, M. carlhubbsi may be vulnerable to loud anthropogenic sounds, such as those generated by naval sonar and seismic exploration.

== See also ==
- List of cetaceans
