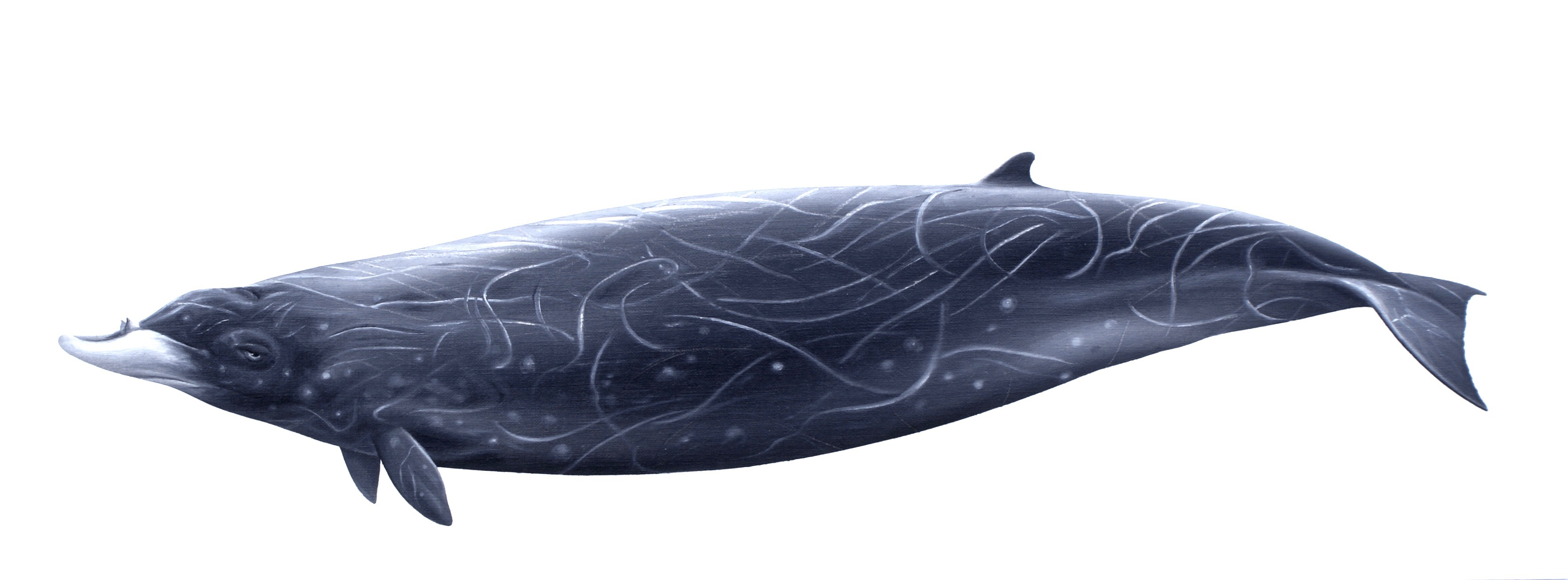

- Size compared to an average human

Conservation status
- Data Deficient (IUCN 3.1)
- CITES Appendix II

Scientific classification
- Kingdom: Animalia
- Phylum: Chordata
- Class: Mammalia
- Order: Artiodactyla
- Infraorder: Cetacea
- Family: Ziphiidae
- Genus: Mesoplodon
- Species: M. bowdoini

Binomial name
- Mesoplodon bowdoini Andrews, 1908
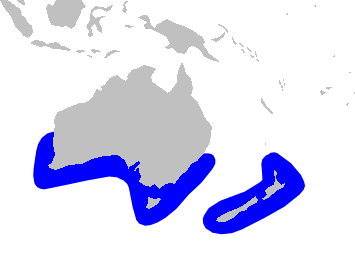
- Andrews' beaked whale range

= Andrews' beaked whale =

Species of mammal

Andrews' beaked whale (Mesoplodon bowdoini), sometimes known as the deep-crest beaked whale or splay-toothed whale, is one of the least known members of a poorly known genus. The species has never been observed in the wild, and is known only from specimens washed up on beaches.

== Taxonomy ==
The species was first described in 1908 by the American scientist Roy Chapman Andrews from a specimen collected at New Brighton Beach, Canterbury Province, New Zealand, in 1904. He named it in honor of George S. Bowdoin, a donor and trustee to the American Museum of Natural History.

== Description ==
3d model of skeleton

Andrews' beaked whale is a medium-sized beaked whale, with males typically reaching lengths of 3.4 m (11.2 ft) to 4.4 m (14.4 ft) and females 3.7 m (12.1 ft) to 4.9 m (16.1 ft). Calves are around 2.2 m (7.2 ft). Weight is uncomfirmed, however mesoplodonts of similar sizes are recorded at 1-1.5 t. It has a robust, spindle-shaped body, low melon, and short, thick beak with a pair of large, flattened tusks that only erupt from the arched lower jaw in adult males. The teeth of females remain unerupted in the less-arched jawline.

Adult males are dark brown or black with a contrasting pale lower jaw and rostrum tip, while females are bluish-gray to slate grey in the dorsal surface, fading to pale sides and underside and also share the pale to whitish lower jaw and rostrum tip. Both sexes may have a small, light or pale patch in front of the eye. Subadult males look very similar to females, especially before their tusks develop. Calves are dark dorsally and light ventrally with a notably dark eye patch.

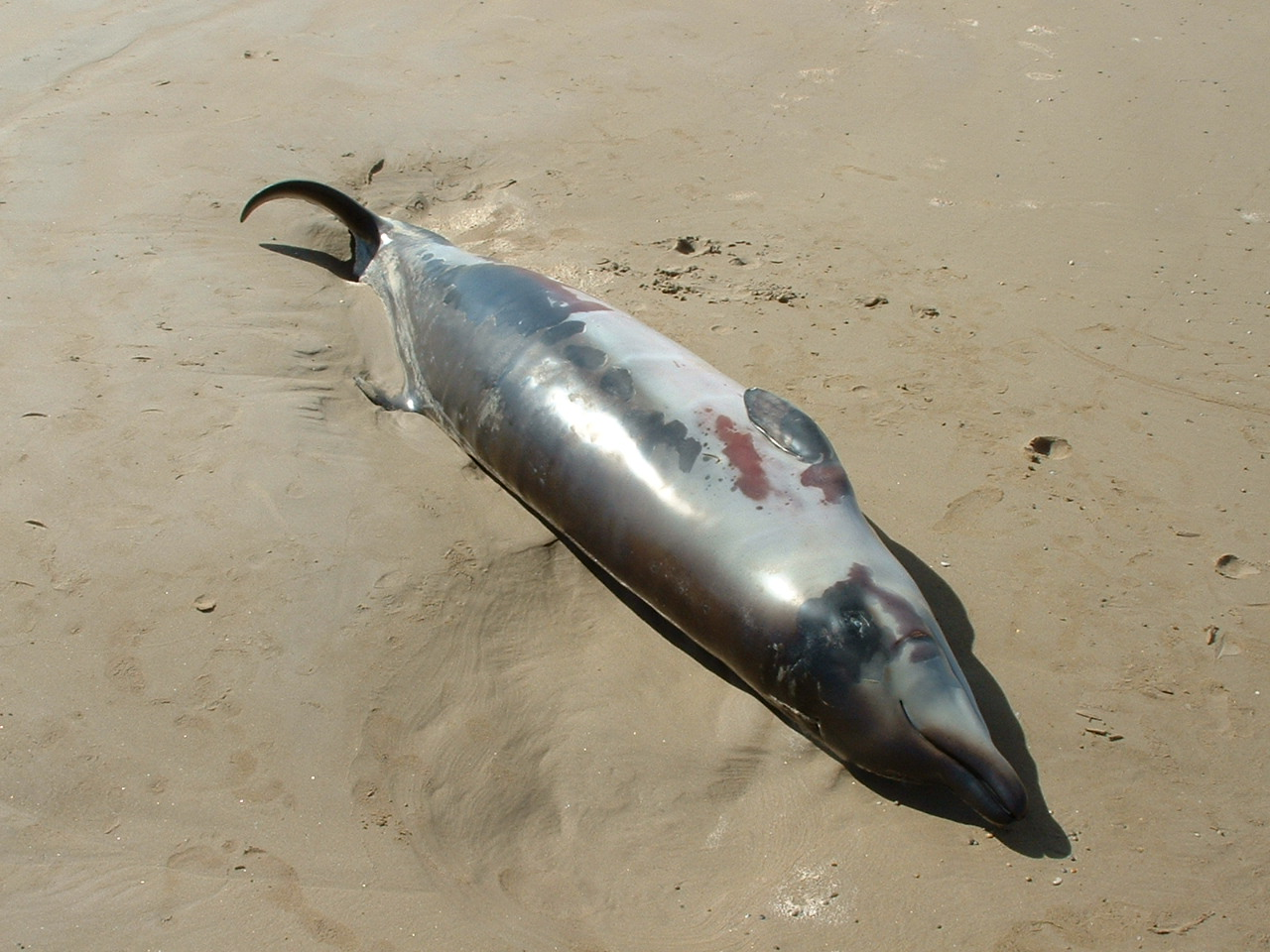
Neonate individual beachwashed on Tasmania.

The flippers are small and narrow and are set relatively low on the body. Slight depressions known as "flipper pockets" are located behind the flippers and allow the whales to better streamline themselves while diving. The dorsal fin is small, triangular and positioned far back on the body. The flukes are broad relative to the body and typically lack a prominent median notch.

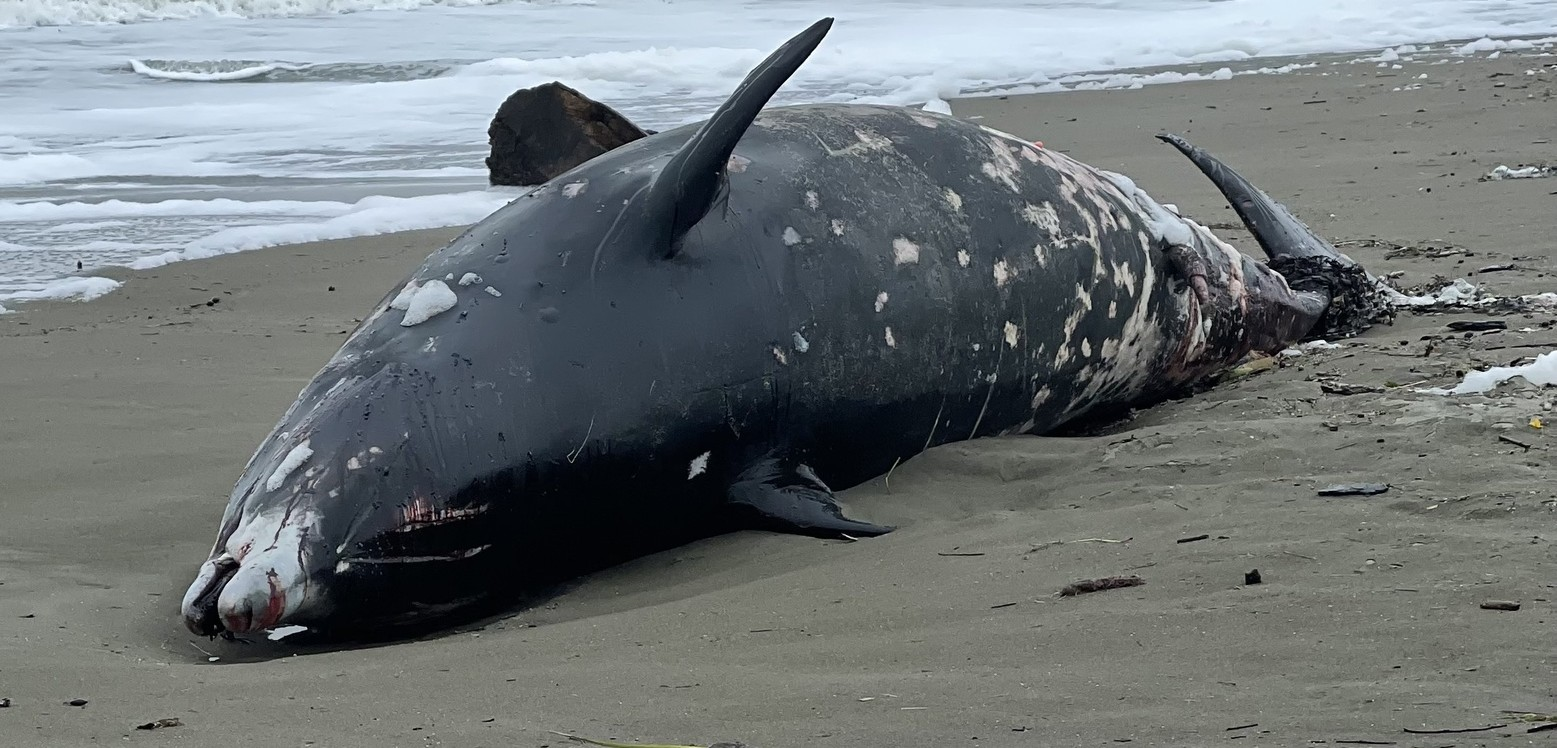
A dead male observed on a beach near Poverty Bay, New Zealand. Prominent white rostrum is characteristic of this species.

== Behavior ==
=== Food and foraging ===
Andrews' beaked whales are likely deep-diving, echolocating suction-feeders. Like other beaked whales, this species possess a pair of V-shaped throat grooves that are thought to facilitate suction feeding by creating negative pressure within the mouth as the tongue retracts and the throat grooves expand, powerfully drawing prey inward like a biological vacuum. While the exact diet of this species is unknown, it likely preys on deep-sea squid such as Histioteuthis, Taonius pavo, and Chiroteuthis, as well as fish.

=== Social behavior ===
Like other Mesoplodon species, Andrews' beaked whales may form pods of 1-5 individuals. Males are notable in having extensive, linear pale to white scarring throughout the body which contrasts against the dark skin. These are presumed to be the result of use of tusks in male-male combat, perhaps for access to females.

The calving season may be during summer and autumn off New Zealand. Otherwise, any behavior is completely unknown.

=== Predators ===
The only animals that may hunt this species are killer whales and large sharks. Both sexes are typically covered in small, pale circular or oval healed wounds from cookiecutter sharks, sometimes concentrated around the genitals and sides.

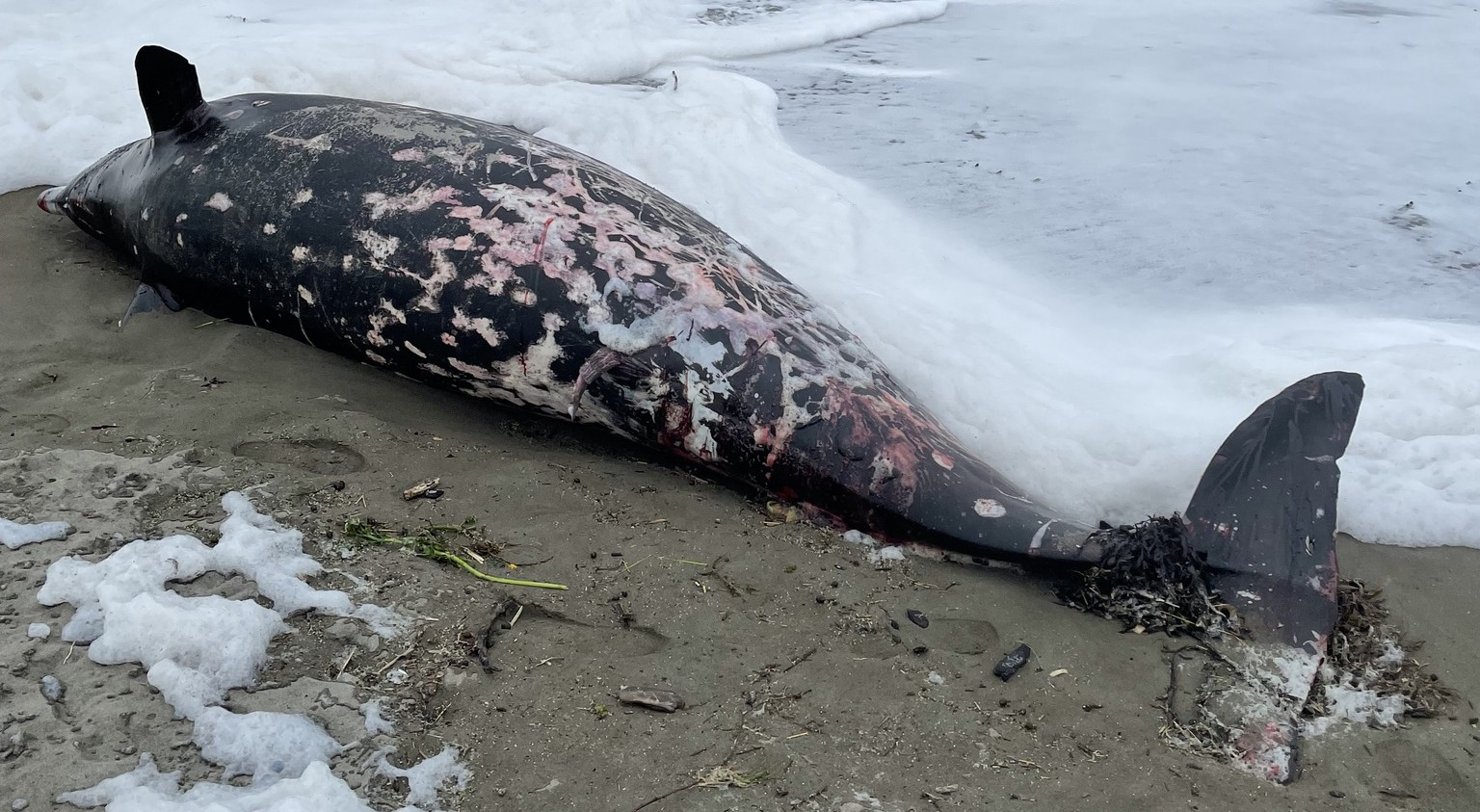
Dead male covered in many cookiecutter shark bite wounds.

== Population and distribution ==
Andrews' beaked whales live in the Southern Hemisphere, and the precise range is uncertain. Some 48 stranded specimens have been recorded in Australia and New Zealand, Macquarie Island, the Falkland Islands, and Tristan da Cunha. That range may imply a circumpolar distribution. However, there are no confirmed sightings to confirm this.

== Conservation ==
Andrews' beaked whale has never been hunted, and there are no records of it being caught in fishing gear. In addition, Andrews' beaked whale is covered by the Memorandum of Understanding for the Conservation of Cetaceans and Their Habitats in the Pacific Islands Region (Pacific Cetaceans MOU).

== Specimens ==
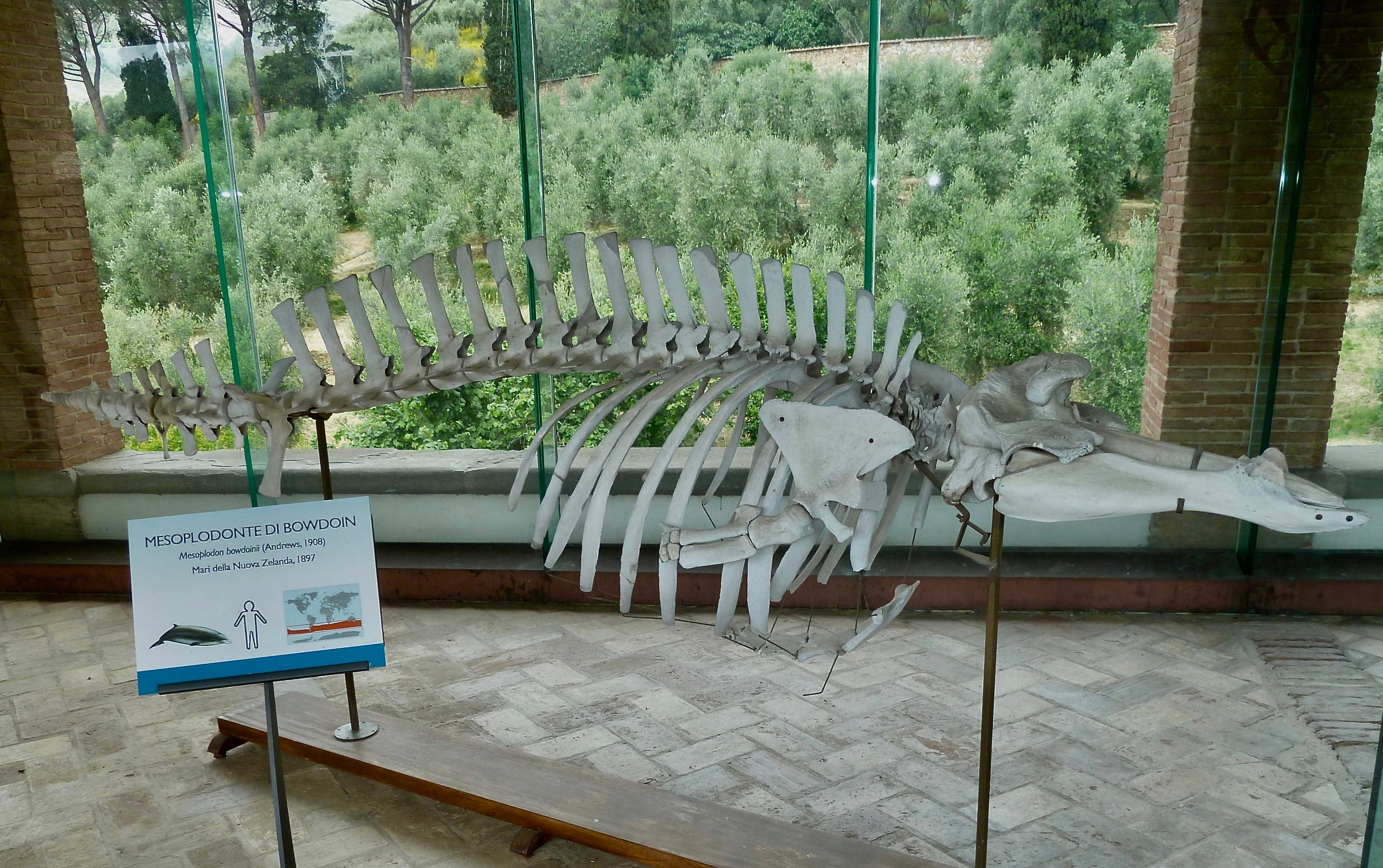
Skeleton in the Natural History Museum of Pisa

- MNZ MM002133, collected Spirits Bay, Northland, New Zealand 1992

== See also ==
- List of cetaceans
