= Rochelle Constantine =

New Zealand cetacean researcher

Rochelle Constantine ONZM
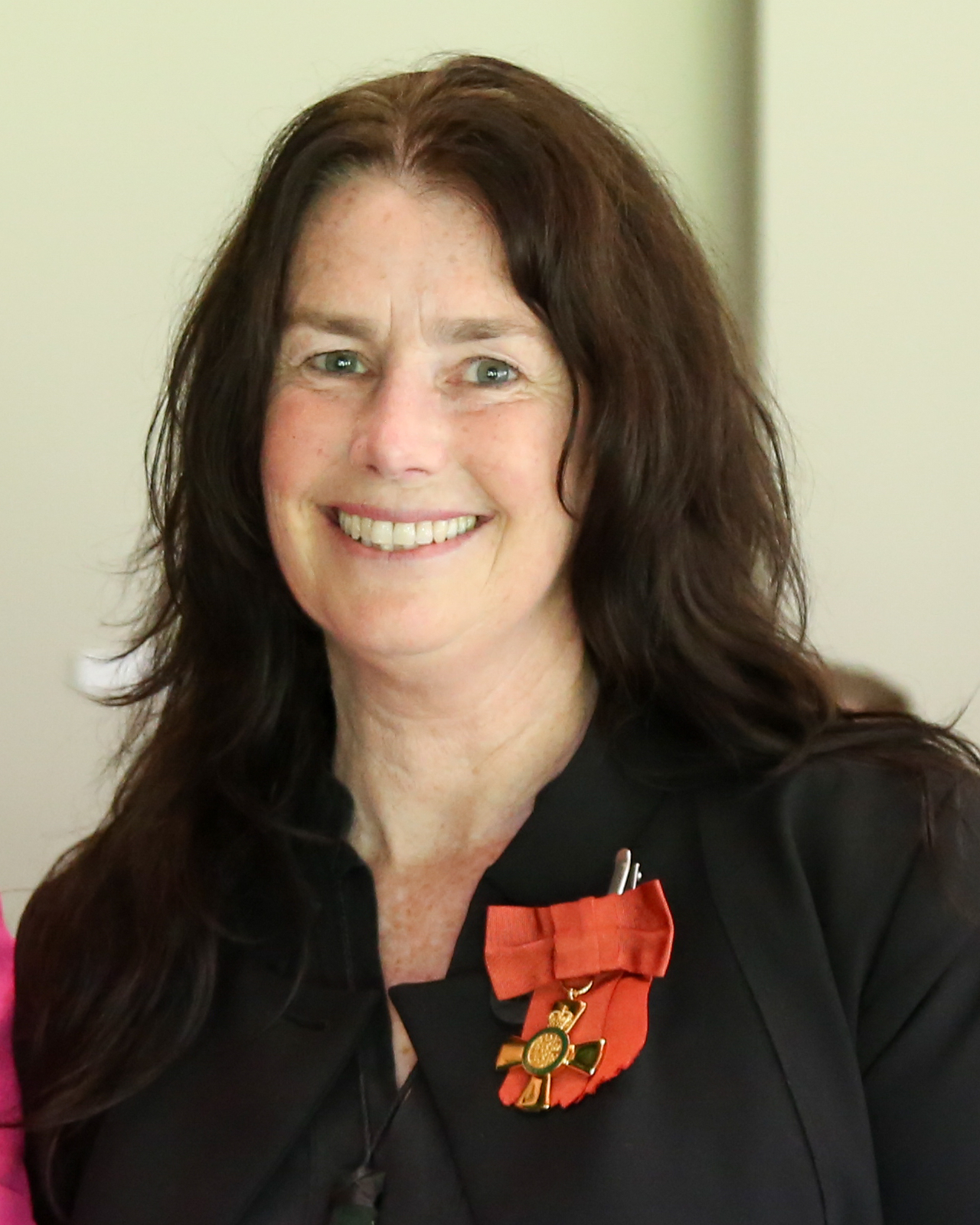
- Constantine in 2023
- Other name: Rochelle Lee Constantine

Academic background
- Education: University of Auckland
- Thesis: The behavioural ecology of the bottlenose dolphins (Tursiops truncatus) of northeastern New Zealand: a population exposed to tourism (2002)
- Doctoral advisor: Scott Baker, Dianne Brunton, Nick Gales, Bernd Würsig

Academic work
- Institutions: University of Auckland

Rochelle Lee Constantine ONZM is a New Zealand marine biologist, and is a full professor at the University of Auckland. Constantine specialises in marine mammal conservation.

== Academic career ==
Constantine completed a PhD titled The behavioural ecology of the bottlenose dolphins (Tursiops truncatus) of northeastern New Zealand: a population exposed to tourism at the University of Auckland in 2002. Constantine then joined the faculty, rising to full professor, and leader of the Marine Mammal Ecology Lab.

Constantine's research focuses on marine mammal conservation. Her research into accidental deaths of Bryde's whales in the Hauraki Gulf led to lower speed limits in shipping lanes to protect the whales. Constantine has also worked on Hector's and Māui dolphin threat management plans. In 2016 she co-led an expedition to the Kermadecs and her research has traced the migration patterns of humpback whales through Oceania, the Kermadec Islands and Antarctica.

Constantine is a member of the Executive Committee of the South Pacific Whale Consortium and co-founded a charitable trust to research technologies for marine conservation. Since 2010 Constantine has been Chair of the International Whaling Commission – Southern Ocean Research Partnership humpback whale research since 2010.

== Honours and awards ==
Constantine's work on ship-strike of Bryde's whale won her one of three inaugural Holdaway Awards in 2013.

In the 2023 King's Birthday and Coronation Honours, Constantine was appointed an Officer of the New Zealand Order of Merit, for services to wildlife conservation and marine biology.

In 2025, Constantine was awarded the Fleming Medal of the Royal Society Te Apārangi.

== Selected works ==
- Constantine, Rochelle Lee; Brunton, Dianne Heather; Dennis, Todd E. (2004). "Dolphin-watching tour boats change bottlenose dolphin (Tursiops truncatus) behaviour". Biological Conservation. 117 (3): 299–307. doi:10.1016/j.biocon.2003.12.009. Wikidata Q55970324.
- Constantine, Rochelle Lee (2001). "Increased avoidance of swimmers by wild bottlenose dolphins (Tursiops truncatus) due to long-term exposure to swim-with-dolphin tourism". Marine Mammal Science. 17 (4): 689–702. doi:10.1111/j.1748-7692.2001.tb01293.x. Wikidata Q119080377.
- Garland, Ellen; Anne W Goldizen; Melinda L Rekdahl; et al. (2011). "Dynamic horizontal cultural transmission of humpback whale song at the ocean basin scale". Current Biology. 21 (8): 687–691. doi:10.1016/j.cub.2011.03.019. PMID 21497089. Wikidata Q51601731.
- Hindell, Mark; Ryan R Reisinger; Yan Ropert-Coudert; et al. (2020). "Tracking of marine predators to protect Southern Ocean ecosystems". Nature. 580 (7801): 87–92. doi:10.1038/s41586-020-2126-y. PMID 32238927. Wikidata Q90836193.
