= Fresh water skin disease =

Disease of dolphins and other cetaceans

Fresh water skin disease (FWSD) is a disease of marine cetaceans in coastal and estuarine environments, caused when they are exposed for extended periods to water with lower than normal levels of salt (hypo-saline). It has been observed in dolphins that were displaced into freshwater lakes, and in normally-salty lakes and estuaries where salinity has dropped suddenly due to flooding or storm runoff.

The symptoms are widespread skin lesions and ulcers. Circular lesions can resemble cetacean pox, which is more common in juveniles. Chronic lesions may have overgrowths of algal and/or fungal mats. Extended exposure can lead to over-hydration, electrolyte imbalance, and organ failure.

The syndrome has been observed particularly with bottlenose dolphins Tursiops truncatus in Lake Pontchartrain, Louisiana from 2007, thought to have been trapped by Hurricane Katrina in 2005; with T. australis at Gippsland Lakes in 2007; with T. aduncus at the Swan Canning Riverpark (Swan and Canning rivers) in 2009; and with T. truncatus in Texas following Hurricane Harvey in 2017. In the Gippsland Lakes, the sudden decrease in salinity followed a slow build-up during ten years of drought.

Plaques or ulcers have also been observed in the Chilean dolphin (Cephalorhynchus eutropia) in Patagonia, Guiana dolphins (Sotalia guianensis) in Brazil, and a pair of a humpback whales (Megaptera novaengliae) in northern California.

In September 2023, five Bottlenose dolphins died in the Manning River, NSW, Australia due to fresh water exposure. All dolphins died between 5.5 and 13.5 days of entering a freshwater stretch of the river between Tinonee and Wingham during a king tide, and then were unable to return downstream. Extensive testing of the last surviving dolphin was carried out after it was able to be captured by a skilled multi disciplinary team including the Sea World Foundation. The dolphin showed signs of severe skin lesions and died on route to rehabilitation despite having specialist veterinary care and equipment available. It is confirmed that in 2008 an earlier pod of dolphins were also reported stranded in this same location, and they all died here.

The histology and pathology from dolphins that died in the 2007 and 2009 Australian events was published in 2020, with the name "fresh water skin disease".
