= William Perrin =

William Perrin may refer to:

- William Perrin (bishop) (1848–1934), Anglican bishop
- William Gordon Perrin (1874–1931), R.A.F. and Navy officer
- Bill Perrin, baseball player
- William F. Perrin (born 1938), American biologist

== See also ==
- William Perring
- William Perrins
