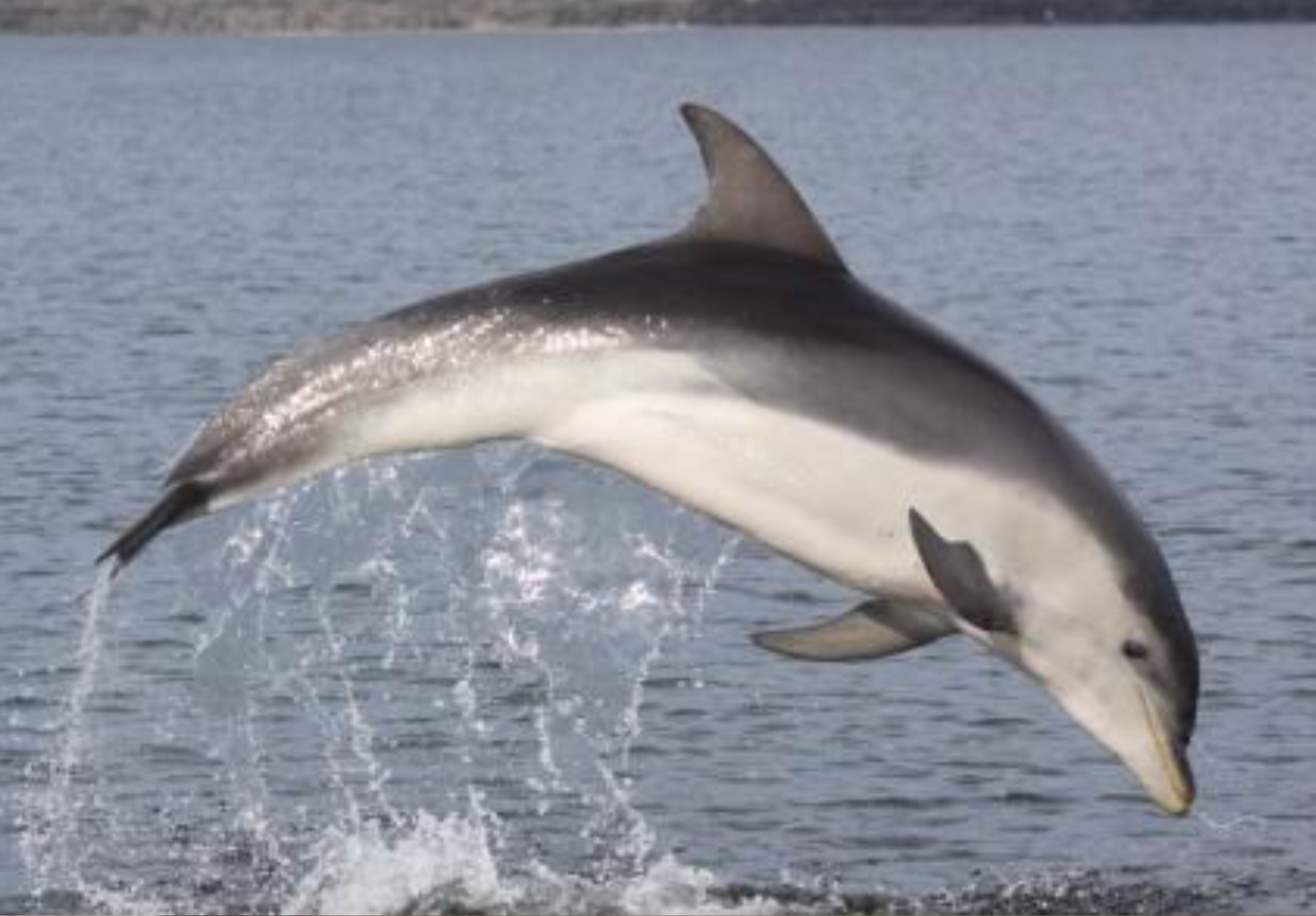

Scientific classification
- Kingdom: Animalia
- Phylum: Chordata
- Class: Mammalia
- Infraclass: Placentalia
- Order: Artiodactyla
- Infraorder: Cetacea
- Family: Delphinidae
- Genus: Tursiops
- Species: T. australis

Binomial name
- Tursiops australis Charlton-Robb et al. 2011

Synonyms
- Tursiops aduncus australis

= Burrunan dolphin =

Species of mammal

The Burrunan dolphin (Tursiops australis) is a proposed species of bottlenose dolphin found in parts of Victoria, Australia first described in 2011. Its exact taxonomy is debated: numerous studies support it as being a separate species within the genus Tursiops and occupying a basal position within the genus, with limited phylogenetic studies using different methodologies indicate that it is a subspecies of the Indo-Pacific bottlenose dolphin (Tursiops aduncus). The Burrunan dolphin is not currently recognized as a species by the Society for Marine Mammalogy or American Society of Mammalogists, which cites problematic methodology in the original study proposing species status and recommends further research.

There are only two known resident populations in Victoria, Australia, with an estimated total population size of less than 180 individuals, and the predicted effective populations sizes small; Port Phillip Bay: 81.5, Gippsland Lakes and Tasmania: 65.5.

Prior to proposal of the name T. (aduncus) australis, the term "Tursiops species, southern Australian bottlenose dolphin (SABD)" had been used.

== Taxonomy ==
The Burrunan dolphin has had a heavily debated taxonomy. It was formally named Tursiops australis by the researcher who described it, Kate Charlton-Robb of Monash University, and colleagues. The dolphin's common name, Burrunan, is an Aboriginal name in the Boonwurrung, Woiwurrung and Taungurung languages, meaning "large sea fish of the porpoise kind". The name australis is the Latin adjective "southern", and refers to the Australian range of the dolphin. It was the third time since the late 19th century that a new dolphin species had been recognised.

Some differences had previously been noted prior to its description, but for a long time not enough evidence was available to classify it as its own taxon. An examination of their skulls, external characteristics, and DNA from old and current samples revealed unique characteristics supporting its classification as a separate species. However, later studies either supported or disputed these findings.

In March 2020, the Canadian Journal of Zoology published "Taxonomy and distribution of bottlenose dolphins (genus Tursiops) in Australian waters: an osteological clarification" by Maria Jedensjö et al., which questioned the classification of T. australis as a distinct species. The study conducted a comprehensive osteological survey on the skulls of 264 dolphins using 2D and 3D morphometrics, and found that the Burrunan dolphin fell well within T. truncatus using both techniques. However, a larger body of evidence still exists to validate the Burrunan as a species using mtDNA regions, concatenated mtDNA/nuDNA sequences, the mitogenome, and more recently the time-calibrated molecular phylogeny of Artiodactyla.

In May 2020, a separate phylogenomic analysis that used a double digest RADseq protocol (in contrast to the previous studies, which used whole mitogenomes) found that the South Australian form of the Burrunan dolphin fell within T. aduncus, forming a monophyletic lineage that is sister to an undescribed, wider coastal Australasian subspecies. Samples from the original species description, including the holotype of the species, from Victoria and Tasmania, were not included in this study. The same study also disputed the alleged polyphyly between Tursiops and Stenella found in previous studies, finding this to be a consequence of reticulate evolution in Tursiops (including past introgression from Stenella) and incomplete lineage sorting in the studies. The American Society of Mammalogists has followed the results of this study and now classifies T. australis under T. aduncus, although it also acknowledges the debate over its status.

== Description ==
The Burrunan dolphin is dark bluish-gray at the top near to the dorsal fin extending over the head and sides of the body. Along the midline, it is a lighter gray which extends as a blaze over on the side near the dorsal fin. Ventrally, it is off-white, which reaches over the eye and the flipper in some instances. By size, it is smaller than the common bottlenose dolphin, but larger than the Indo-Pacific bottlenose dolphin, measuring between 2.27 and 2.78 m (7.4 and 9.1 ft) in length.

== Distribution and habitat ==
The recognition of T. australis is particularly significant given the endemism of this new subspecies to a small geographic region of southern and south-eastern Australia. Only two resident populations of the Burrunan dolphin have been identified, one in Port Phillip and the other in the Gippsland Lakes. Their combined population has been estimated as about 100 in Port Phillip and 50 in Gippsland. Additionally, T. australis haplotypes have been documented in dolphins located in waters off eastern Tasmania, and in coastal waters of South Australia in the Spencer Gulf region and west to St Francis Island. The initial report on the Burrunan dolphin suggested that the low number of individuals found might immediately qualify the population for protection under the Environment Protection and Biodiversity Conservation Act. The Burrunan dolphin is yet to be listed, or categorized, under the EPBC Act or IUCN Red List due to data deficiencies; however, it is listed as 'Critically Endangered' under the State of Victoria's Flora and Fauna Guarantee Act 1988.

== Threats ==
The species is found in estuaries and sheltered bays of the southern coasts of Australia, often in locations that make them vulnerable to human activities. Anthropogenic disturbances, such as dolphin-swim tour vessels, distract Burrunan dolphins from foraging and resting. The Burrunan is vulnerable to extinction due to several different factors relating to exposure to threats, data deficiency, low genetic diversity and low population sizes, high mercury levels, and increased risk from pathogens and contaminants. Small localised populations may be at high risk of extinction through demographic and genetic stochasticity, particularly if they occur close to urban areas where anthropogenic threats abound. Anthropogenic activities, such as cetacean-based tourism or recreational boating, can impact dolphins through physical presence, non-compliance to regulations and acoustic disturbance. Such disturbances can negatively affect the long-term viability of small resident populations, summarised in Puszka et al. 2021.

As recent case study conducted by the Marine Mammal Foundation and RMIT (Research Lead Dr Kate Robb), provided the first field assessment of vessel compliance with the Wildlife (Marine Mammal) Regulations 2009 in Gippsland Lakes, Australia, and provided the first assessment of the endangered Gippsland Lakes Burrunan dolphin (Tursiops australis) population's behavioural ecology. Dolphin behaviour and vessel regulation compliance data were collected during boat-based surveys of Gippsland Lakes from July 2017 to January 2018, with a total of 22 dolphin group sightings resulting in 477 five-minute point samples. 77% of dolphin sightings involved vessel interactions (within 400 m), and 56 regulation breaches were observed. These breaches were most severe in summer (mean = 4.54 breaches/hour). Vessels were found to alter dolphin behaviour before, during, and after interactions and regulation breaches, including increased mating (mate guarding) and milling behavioural states, and increased 'fish catch', 'high leap' and 'tail slap' behavioural events. These behavioural changes may indicate masking of the dolphins' acoustic communication, disturbance of prey, increased dolphin transition behaviours, and/or induced stress and changes to group structure (including increased mate guarding).

Fresh water skin disease (FWSD) has been described from the population in Gippsland Lakes, when weather conditions caused excessive influx of fresh water into the normally brackish-to-salty lake system. Increased incidence of these weather events could threaten the small population in the lakes.

== Gallery ==
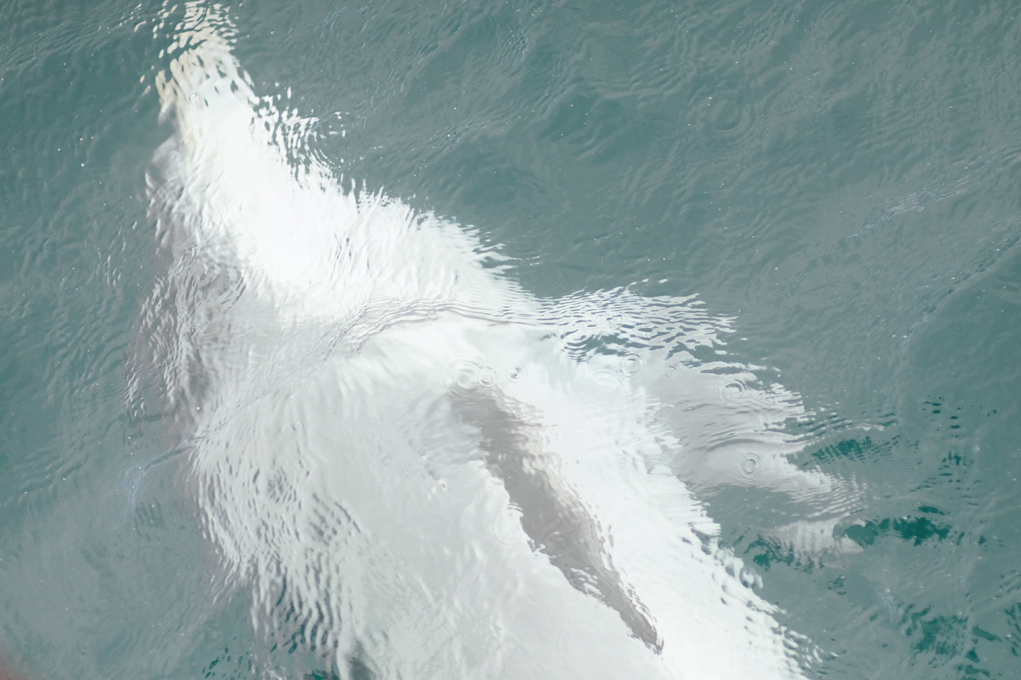
Burrunan dolphin bow riding in Port Phillip Bay, Victoria, Australia

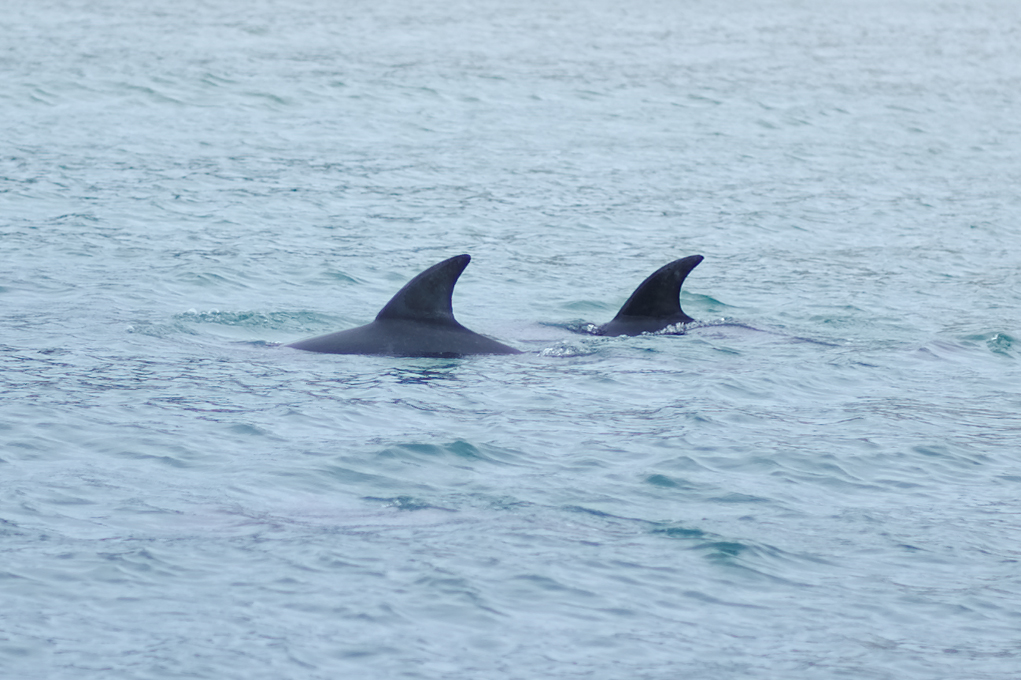
Burrunan dolphins in Port Phillip Bay, Victoria, Australia

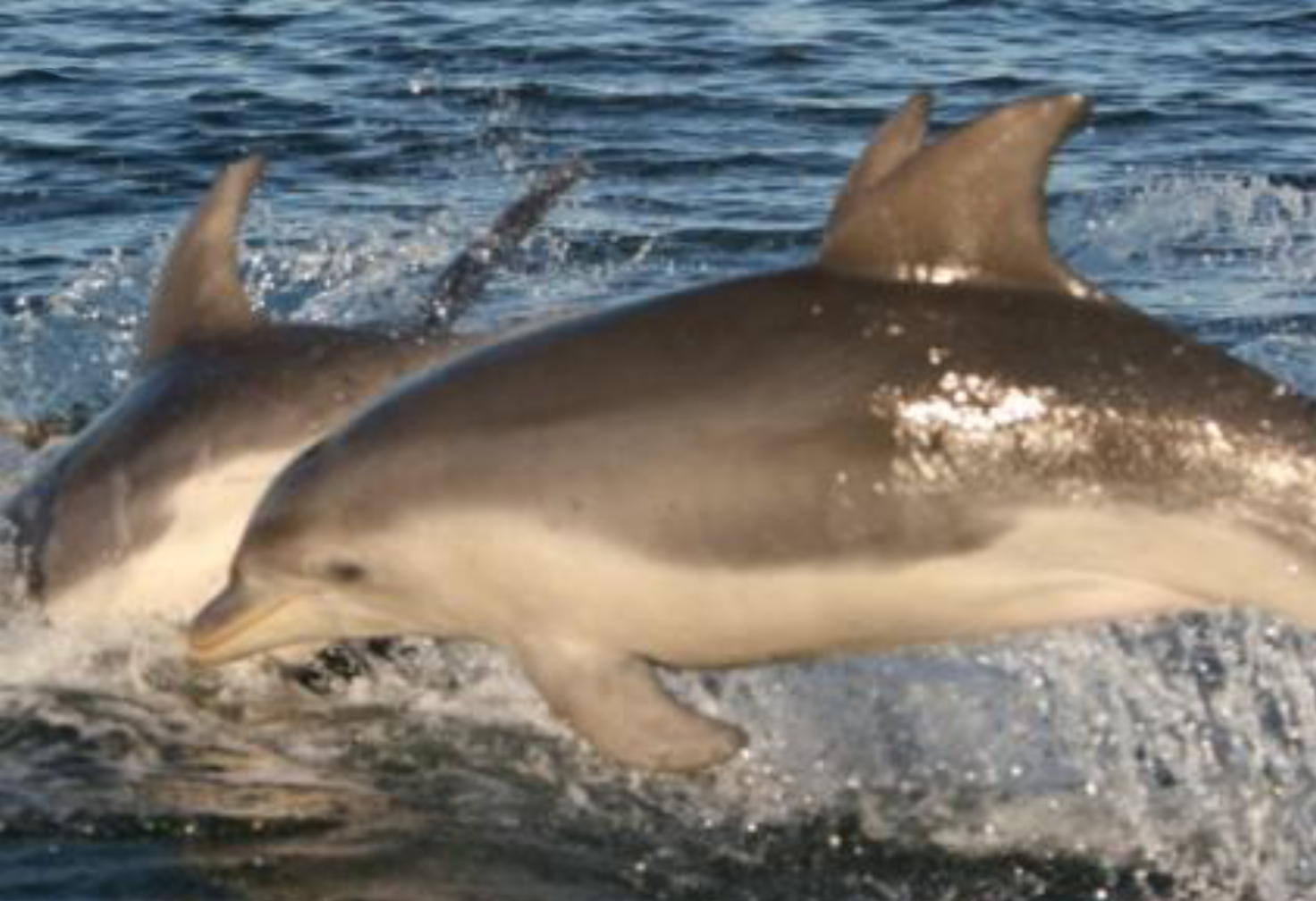
Burrunan dolphins jumping

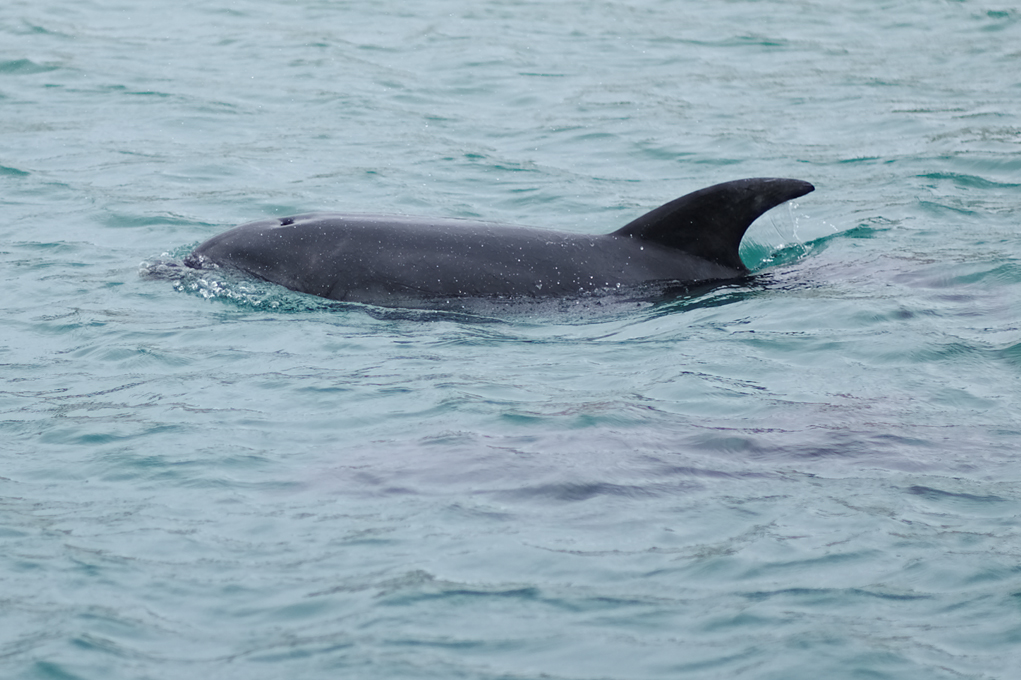
Burrunan dolphin

== See also ==
- List of cetaceans
- Marine biology
