= Bernd Würsig =

Marine mammal behavioral ecologist

- Würsig at home near Houston, Texas
- Born: November 9, 1948 (age 78); Barsinghausen, Germany
- Education: Stony Brook University
- Known for: Cetacean photo-identification; Marine mammal theodolite tracking; Dolphin behavioral studies; Encyclopedia of Marine Mammals
- Awards: Senior Fulbright Fellow; National Geographic Society Chairman's Award; Life Time Achievement: American Cetacean Society
- Scientific career
- Fields: Marine mammal behavioral ecologist
- Workplaces: Texas A&M University at Galveston
- Doctoral advisors: Charles Walcott and George C. Williams
- Doctoral students: Rochelle Constantine

Bernd Gerhard Würsig (born 9 November 1948 in Barsinghausen, Germany) is an educator and researcher who works mainly on aspects of behavior and behavioral ecology of whales and dolphins. Much of his early work was done in close collaboration with his wife Melany Ann Würsig (born Carballeira), and they have published numerous manuscripts and books together. He is now Professor Emeritus at Texas A&M University, teaching only occasionally but still involved with graduate student and other research. He is especially active with problems and potential solutions concerning Indo-Pacific humpback dolphins, Sousa chinensis, in and surrounding waters of Hong Kong. Würsig has conducted research with marine mammals in several parts of the world, including the South Atlantic, Hawaii, US and Canadian Arctic, New Zealand, the Gulf of Mexico, Hong Kong, the Yangtze River of Central China, the Peruvian Amazon, and the Russian Far East.

== Early career and education ==
Bernd Würsig is the youngest of three sons of Gerhard and Charlotte Würsig, Silesian refugees who moved to (then) West Germany after the World War II, and to the United States under a refugee family visa in 1956. They settled in Ohio, and Würsig became interested as a boy in marine mammals after reading books by the Austrian explorers Hans Hass and Lotte Hass, French Jacques Cousteau, and American John C. Lilly. He went to Ohio State University, and received a Bachelor of Science degree in zoology (minor in Germanic Literature) in 1971. Würsig went to Stony Brook University (then the State University of New York at Stony Brook), 1971–1978, in an interdisciplinary Ph.D. program with advisors in the Departments of Marine Science, Ecology and Evolution, and Neurobiology and Behavior. His advisors in the latter two, George Williams in Ecology and Evolution and Charles Walcott in Neurobiology and Behavior, had a strong influence on Würsig's career, as the former imbued him with a sense of the wonders of animal social/sexual strategies, and the latter with a lifelong appreciation for how to think about animal capabilities, relative to our own capabilities of observation with basic tools such as binoculars to sophisticated radio, theodolite, and other remote sensing techniques. Würsig's field advisor Roger Payne, the discoverer of humpback whale song and long-range communication in fin and blue whales, was his mentor during field work on dolphins in coastal Patagonia, Argentina.From 1978 to 1981, Würsig also worked with Kenneth S. Norris as a National Institutes of Health and National Science Foundation post-doctoral fellow, and then became assistant professor at Moss Landing Marine Laboratories, central California, where he went through the professor ranks in the 1980s, becoming full professor in spring 1989. That year, he and Melany and their two children Paul and Kim moved to Texas A&M University, where he started the Marine Mammal Research Program (now Marine Mammal Behavioral Ecology Group).

== Academic career ==
He joined Texas A&M University in 1989 as a professor of marine biology and wildlife and fisheries sciences. He subsequently developed the university's marine mammal research activities at the Galveston campus and served as director of the Marine Mammal Research Program and later the Marine Mammal Behavioral Ecology Group. He also served as director of the Institute of Marine Life Sciences from 1996 to 2010. Courses associated with his teaching included Biology of Marine Mammals, Cetacean Behavior and Behavioral Ecology, Behavioral Ecology of Marine Mammals and Seabirds of New Zealand, and field-based courses in New Zealand and Greece, dealing with dolphins, fisheries, and conservation.

He was appointed a Regents Professor of the Texas A&M University System in 2006. The Regents Professorship program recognizes professors for service and contributions at university, state, national, or international levels; Texas A&M's records list Würsig among the system's Regents Professors.

In 2012, he was appointed to the George P. Mitchell '40 Chair in Sustainable Fisheries. In 2013, Texas A&M University designated him a University Distinguished Professor. The university describes the University Distinguished Professorship as a title recognizing faculty achievement in teaching, mentoring, discovery, and service. Würsig became University Distinguished Professor Emeritus in 2016.

Until Spring 2018, Würsig taught undergraduate and graduate courses in aspects of marine mammalogy, specializing in behavior and behavioral ecology. He has published widely in the popular literature as part of teaching endeavors, such as for the journals Natural History and Scientific American, and he has been advisor to numerous movies made for television, as well as the IMAX movie “Dolphins” (2000) that was nominated for an Academy Award, Best Documentary Short Subject. He formerly led field courses on marine bird and mammal biology in Argentina, Mexico, Spain, China, New Zealand, Greece, Alaska, and elsewhere, but as Professor Emeritus does so only occasionally.

== Research ==
Most of Würsig's research, while focused generally on social, sexual, calf rearing, and foraging strategies, has been related to human use of the marine environment, as well as tucuxi and boto dolphins of the Amazon and the now believed to be extinct baiji of the Yangtze River. He may be the only researcher to have worked with both the baiji and the presently highly endangered vaquita, or Gulf of California harbor porpoise of the northern Gulf of California, Mexico. Besides working with river dolphins in Peru and China, Würsig has worked with oceanic whales in Argentina, far east Russia, and the Arctic; and a host of delphinids from the Bahamas to Patagonia Argentina, from north-central California to Hong Kong and South Island New Zealand. A summary of his research life, especially as related to social strategies, is presented by Grady (2003). Much of his work has been collaborative, and he has published with students and colleagues on issues of multi-species interactions among pinnipeds and cetaceans, marine mammals and marine birds, and noise pollution and mitigative effects. His present work is with Indo-Pacific humpback dolphins in Hong Kong, dusky dolphins on the South Island of New Zealand, and western gray whales of far east Russia, all collaboratively with graduate students.

=== Dolphin behavior and individual identification ===
Some of Würsig's early research examined bottlenose and dusky dolphins in the South Atlantic. In collaboration with Melany Carballeira Würsig, he published studies of the behavior and ecology of bottlenose and dusky dolphins in Argentine waters. Their research included observations of group organization and the use of natural markings to identify individual animals. A 1977 paper in Science described photographic determination of group size, composition, and stability in coastal bottlenose dolphins.

=== Theodolite tracking and behavioral ecology ===
Würsig also helped develop the use of theodolites for tracking marine mammals from land. The technique enabled researchers to record the movements and behavior of cetaceans over relatively large areas without attaching instruments to the animals. His research used such observations to examine movement patterns, group behavior, habitat use, and responses to environmental conditions.

=== Hawaiian spinner dolphins ===
During his postdoctoral research at the University of California, Santa Cruz, Würsig studied Hawaiian spinner dolphins. This work contributed to his continuing interest in the relationship between social behavior, habitat, and ecological conditions in cetaceans. His subsequent work with other researchers examined spinner dolphin grouping and population structure in Hawaiian waters.

=== Dusky dolphins ===
In 2010, he and Melany Würsig published The Dusky Dolphin: Master Acrobat off Different Shores, a detailed account of the species' biology and behavior. The book brought together observations from different populations and examined the species' social behavior, ecology, feeding strategies, and interactions with its environment.

Research involving Würsig has also examined dusky dolphin habitat use in New Zealand's Kaikoura region, including relationships between dolphin distribution and mussel farming. A study published in the New Zealand Journal of Marine and Freshwater Research in 2025 analyzed habitat use in a mussel-farming region and changes over time.

Bernd Würsig and his wife Melany Würsig first described the lives of dusky dolphins, with day/night, seasonal, and overall habitat use patterns. They then went on to describe foraging strategies of dusky dolphins that herd anchovy and communicate with each other within and between groups, with an important communication mode apparently mediated by leaping.

Bernd and Melany Würsig also developed detailed non-invasive photographic recognition of dolphins, a technique now used by hundreds of researchers worldwide, and discovered that common bottlenose dolphins, have an “open” social system of ever-changing affiliations of individuals in groups and subgroups, a now commonly-accepted concept for many species and populations.

=== Bowhead whales ===
Würsig studied bowhead whales along the northslope of Alaska and eastern Canada in the 1980s-1990s, with much work on migrations and strategies of feeding and social/sexual relationships. This work has been put into context with more recent discoveries.

Würsig also accepted two ideas of the great biologist Roger Payne, his field mentor during Ph.D. work, and expanded these throughout much of his own research. One was the development of theodolite tracking of near-shore cetaceans and boats; the other was identification photos and behavioral descriptions of animals from circling aircraft, with which much behavioral description of bowhead whales, was facilitated by Würsig in the U.S. and Canadian Arctic. This work led to detailed descriptions of surface foraging and social behavior, as well as the fact that bowhead whales at times feed on bottom-dwelling organisms.

=== Gray whales ===
Würsig has participated in long-term studies of western gray whales off Sakhalin Island, Russia. Research conducted with colleagues used boat-based photographic identification to investigate seasonal occurrence, annual return, and site fidelity. The study identified individual whales across multiple years and found repeated use of the region as a feeding ground.

=== Human disturbance and underwater noise ===
Würsig and several colleagues developed and tested a bubble curtain system to reduce underwater industrial noises, and this technique has more recently received much engineering and environmental attention. The study, published in Marine Environmental Research in 2000, found that the bubble curtain significantly reduced broadband noise pulse levels at measured distances from the pile-driving operation. The work was conducted in waters inhabited by Indo-Pacific humpback dolphins.

=== Marine mammal conservation ===
Würsig's behavioral research has frequently been linked to conservation questions. His studies have examined how knowledge of animal behavior, habitat use, population structure, and human disturbance can inform the management of marine mammal populations.

His research on western gray whales, for example, documented the repeated use of feeding grounds and individual site fidelity, information relevant to understanding the importance of particular habitats for endangered populations.

== Books and editorial work ==
Würsig has published about 200 peer review manuscripts, but the most important are probably those that first described results of individual recognition of dolphins by dorsal fin markings, theodolite tracking, and the development of a bubble curtain system to lower the intensity of stationary underwater industrial noises. Würsig co-wrote or co-edited books on the biology of spinner dolphins, marine mammals of the Gulf of Mexico, an encyclopedia of marine mammals, biology of dusky dolphins, and a “coffee table” illustrated National Geographic book on whales and dolphins. He has written much on behavior and behavioral ecology of cetaceans, with a 1989 summary paper in the journal Science, and popular publications in Scientific American, 1979, 1988. In 1999 Würsig coauthored a paper with international colleagues and former students David Weller and Amanda Bradford on the seasonal patterns of the western gray whales off Sakhalin Island in Russia. He co-published a monograph on social ecology of delphinids, with Shannon Gowans and Leszek Karczmarski. Würsig and the marine mammal program he founded are mentioned in a book on Texas A&M at Galveston. He published an updated monograph on the marine mammals of the Gulf of Mexico. Würsig series-edited seven books by Springer Nature, Heidelberg Germany, on ethology and behavioral ecology of 1) odontocetes, 2) sea otter and polar bear, 3) eared seals and walrus, 4) true (or "earless") seals, 5) sirens, or manatees and the dugong, 6) mysticetes and 7) a discussion of human-caused problems and potential solutions, "Marine Mammals; The Evolving Human Factor" with Giuseppe Notarbartolo di Sciara. In 2023, Würsig and Mridula Srinivasan co-edited Social Strategies of Carnivorous Mammalian Predators: Hunting and Surviving as Families. The book compares social hunting and survival strategies among several carnivorous mammals and considers how social behavior and ecology affect responses to natural and human-induced threats.

== Selected publications and books ==
- Würsig, B.; Würsig, M. (1977). "The Photographic Determination of Group Size, Composition, and Stability of Coastal Porpoises (Tursiops truncatus)". Science. 198 (4318): 755–756. doi:10.1126/science.198.4318.755.
- Würsig, Bernd (1978). "Occurrence and Group Organization of Atlantic Bottlenose Porpoises (Tursiops truncatus) in an Argentine Bay". The Biological Bulletin. 154 (2): 348–359. doi:10.2307/1541132.
- Würsig, B. (1979). "Dolphins". Scientific American. 240 (3): 136–148. doi:10.1038/scientificamerican0379-136.
- Würsig, Bernd; Würsig, Melany (1979). "Behavior and Ecology of the Bottlenose Dolphin, Tursiops truncatus, in the South Atlantic". Fishery Bulletin. 77 (2).
- Würsig, B.; Würsig, M. (1980). "Behavior and Ecology of the Dusky Dolphin, Lagenorhynchus obscurus, in the South Atlantic". Fishery Bulletin. 77 (4): 871–890.
- Würsig, Bernd (1988). "The Behavior of Baleen Whales". Scientific American.
- Würsig, B. (1989). "Cetaceans". Science. 244 (4912): 1550–1557. doi:10.1126/science.2662403.
- Norris, Kenneth S.; Würsig, Bernd; Wells, Randall S.; Würsig, Melany (1994). The Hawaiian Spinner Dolphin. University of California Press. p. 436. ISBN 9780520913547.
- Whales, Dolphins, and Porpoises (1995).
- Würsig, Bernd; Jefferson, Thomas A.; Schmidly, David J. (2000). The Marine Mammals of the Gulf of Mexico. Texas A&M University Press. ISBN 9780890969090.
- Perrin, William F.; Würsig, Bernd; Thewissen, J. G. M., eds. (2002). Encyclopedia of Marine Mammals. Academic Press. ISBN 9780125513401.
- Würsig, Bernd; Würsig, Melany (2010). The Dusky Dolphin: Master Acrobat off Different Shores. Academic Press. ISBN 9780123737236.
- Würsig, Bernd; Thewissen, J. G. M.; Kovacs, Kit M., eds. (2018). Encyclopedia of Marine Mammals (3rd ed.). Academic Press. ISBN 9780128043271.
- Würsig, Bernd, ed. (2019). Ethology and Behavioral Ecology of Odontocetes. Springer. ISBN 9783030166625.
- Notarbartolo di Sciara, Giuseppe; Würsig, Bernd, eds. (2022). Marine Mammals: The Evolving Human Factor. Springer. ISBN 9783030980993.
- Würsig, Bernd; Orbach, Dara N., eds. (2023). Sex in Cetaceans: Morphology, Behavior, and the Evolution of Sexual Strategies. Springer. ISBN 9783031356506.
- Srinivasan, Mridula; Würsig, Bernd, eds. (2024). Social Strategies of Carnivorous Mammalian Predators: Hunting and Surviving as Families. Springer. ISBN 9783031298028.

== Honors and awards ==
- 1980 Elected Fellow of Research, Explorer's Club
- 1986 Dean's Award for Exemplary Teaching, San José State University of California
- 1991 Alban Heiser Award for Conservation Activities and Education, the Zoological Society of Houston
- 1991-1993 Society for Marine Mammalogy, Elected President
- 1998 The Chairman's Award, Committee for Research and Exploration of the National Geographic Society
- 2001 Academy Award Nomination, Best Science Movie: IMAX movie "Dolphins"(Würsig was senior science advisor)
- 2001-2002 Senior Fulbright Fellow, New Zealand
- 2006 Awarded Regents Professorship
- 2008 Texas A&M University Former Students’ Award – Excellence in Graduate Mentoring
- 2010 Minnie Piper Professor of 2010, for Teaching and Education
- 2012 George Mitchell Chair in Sustainable Fisheries
- 2013 Designated University Distinguished Professor
- 2015 Texas A&M University Former Student's Award - Excellence in Teaching
- 2016 Elected University Distinguished Professor Emeritus
- 2018 American Cetacean Society's John E. Heyning Life Time Achievement Award in Marine Mammal Science
- 2018 Festschrift in Honor of Bernd Würsig, Aquatic Mammals Vol. 44(6):587-768.
- 2019 Nominated Honorary Life Member of the Society for Marine Mammalogy
- 2023 Mandy McMath Conservation Award of the European Cetacean Society
- 2024 Fellow, Society for Marine Mammalogy.
