= Dianne Brunton =

New Zealand ecology researcher

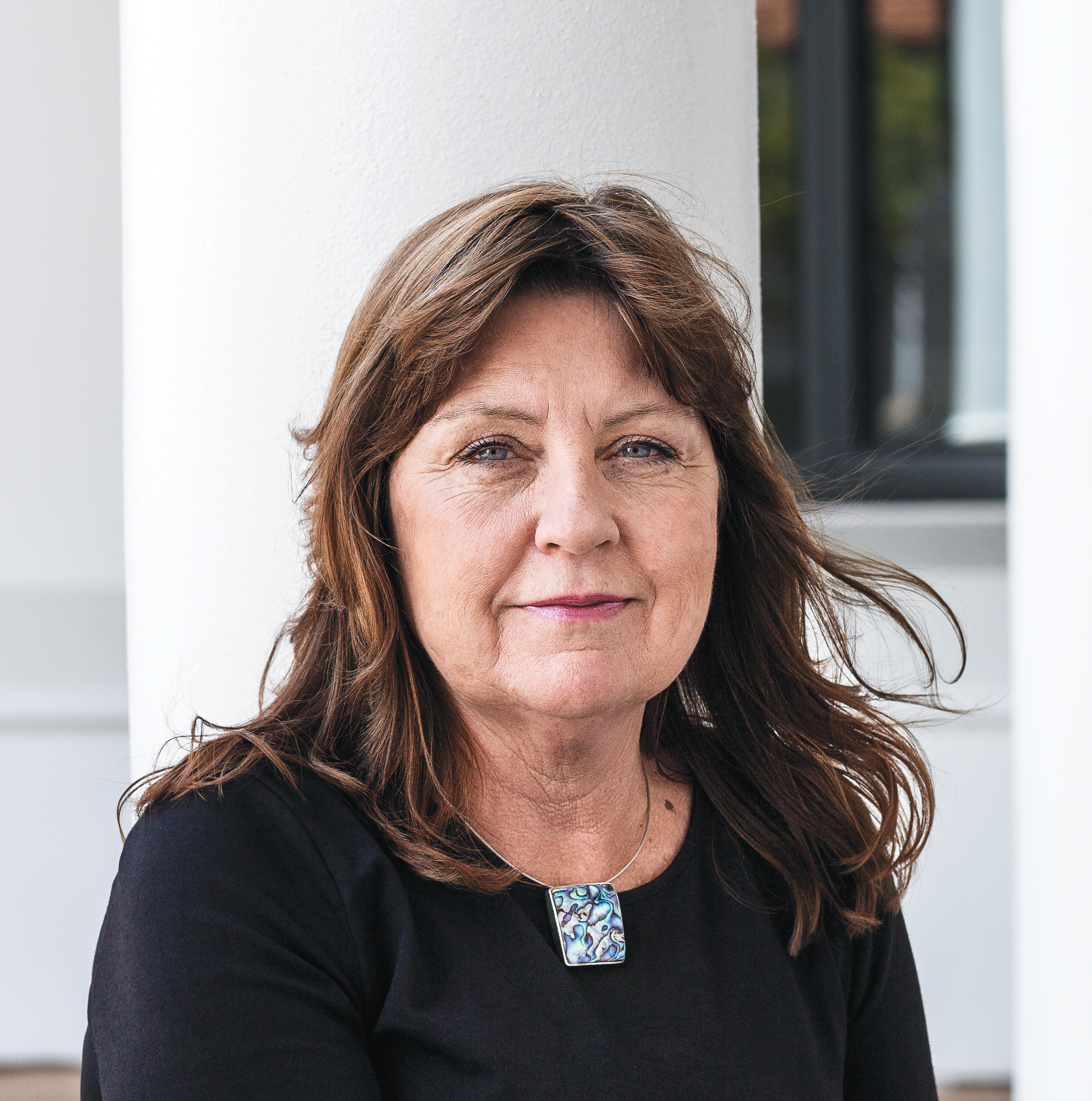
- Education: University of Auckland, University of Michigan
- Spouse: Gaven Martin
- Scientific career
- Fields: Ecology
- Workplaces: Massey University, University of Auckland
- Thesis: Reproductive Effort of Male And Female Killdeer (Charadrius vociferus) (1987)
- Doctoral students: Rochelle Constantine

Dianne Heather Brunton is a New Zealand ecologist, and former head of the Institute of Natural and Computational Sciences at Massey University. Her research area is the behaviour and cultural evolution of animal communication, especially bird song in southern hemisphere species such as the New Zealand bellbird.

== Academic career ==
Brunton grew up in Henderson, and wanted to be a vet from an early age. She completed her undergraduate degree at the University of Auckland, and for her MSc studied the calls of southern black-backed gulls (Larus dominicanus). In 1981 she embarked on a PhD at the University of Michigan in Ann Arbor, intending to study the behaviour of semi-social wasps – until the departmental colony died. She switched to the killdeer plover (Charadrius vociferus) and graduated in 1987.

Brunton did a two-year postdoctoral fellowship at Yale, occupying the office of the recently retired Charles Sibley. In 1991 she returned to New Zealand to take up a lectureship as a biostatistician at the University of Auckland. She joined the faculty of Massey University in December 2004, and founded the university's Ecology and Conservation Group. In 2008 she received a Claude McCarthy Fellowship by Massey for her reptile and bird research. In 2018, in recognition of the 14 PhD and 18 Master's students she had supervised since joining Massey she was awarded an Individual University Supervisor Medal by the university. At that time she had published over 120 scientific papers and received two Marsden grants.

From 2016 to 2021 Brunton was the head of the Institute of Natural and Mathematical Sciences at Massey, based at the Albany campus in Auckland. Brunton is an advocate for eliminating introduced mammalian predators from New Zealand as part of the Predator-Free 2050 initiative. She was also a vocal opponent of Massey University's proposal to move most science faculty and courses to the Palmerston North campus.

== Research ==
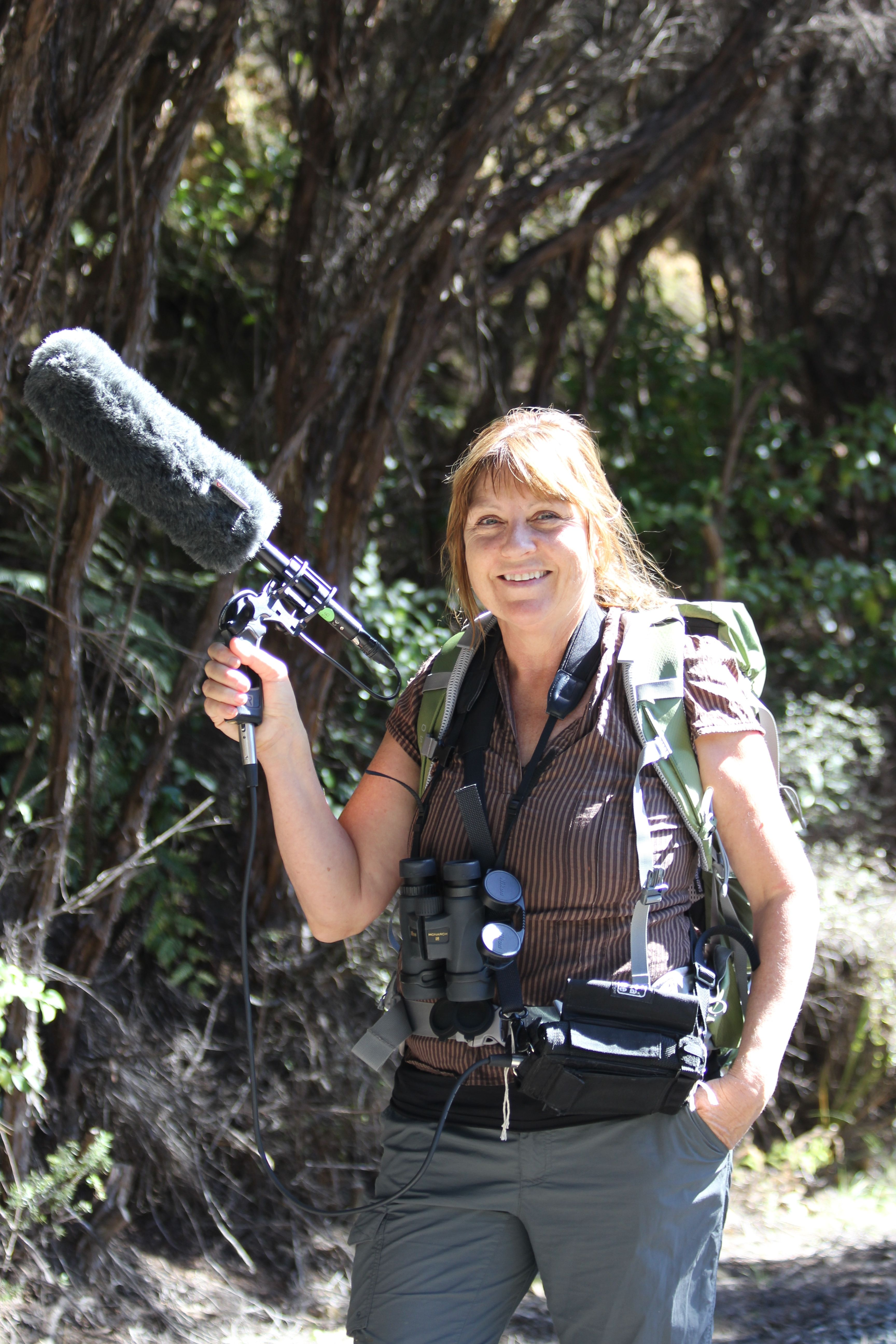
Brunton recording bellbird song at Tawharanui Regional Park

Much of Brunton's research is concerned with the sexual selection and song of southern hemisphere songbirds; in Australasian and tropical songbird species both sexes commonly sing and maintain territories, but in the northern hemisphere, where most behavioural research has been done, usually only males sing. One study examined the mating behaviour of New Zealand bellbirds (Anthornis melanura), and how females distinguished between the friendly and hostile songs of other females. In 2002 Brunton was the first to quantify the song and singing behaviour of bellbirds; she discovered that both male and female birds have distinctive dialects, and that female bellbirds are the sex that disperses to find new territories. Her testing of the "dear enemy" hypothesis with bellbirds – the first time a female songbird had been tested – revealed they were more aggressive to neighbouring females than to strangers, the opposite of what the hypothesis predicted. She also examines the cultural evolution of bird song: how diversity and dialects arise and are maintained, how song memes spread, and the effect of birds dispersing to new habitats.

One of her field sites is the predator-free island sanctuary Tiritiri Matangi, off the coast of Auckland, where with her student Michelle Roper she studied the ecological niche partitioning of bellbirds and hihi (Notiomystis cincta). Another site is Tawharanui Regional Park, north of Auckland, where she discovered by song dialect that the bellbirds which colonised the park had come from Little Barrier Island, not Tiritiri Matangi. In 2013 Brunton received an $820,000 Marsden grant entitled Untangling genes and culture: sex-based song traditions in New Zealand bellbirds, to study male and female dialects; it also supported other projects, including research into the song dialects of grey warblers (Gerygone igata) in Tawharanui.

Her other research interests and collaborations with PhD and MSc students include the welfare of lizard species after conservation translocation, analysing the chemical composition of kākāpō feathers to determine how diet has changed over time, foraging ecology of little penguins (Eudyptula minor), and song dialects in the saddleback (Philesturnus carunculatus).

== Selected works ==
- Brunton, Dianne H.; Roper, Michelle M.; Harmer, Aaron M. T. (2016). "Female Song Rate and Structure Predict Reproductive Success in a Socially Monogamous Bird". Frontiers in Ecology and Evolution. 4. doi:10.3389/fevo.2016.00013. ISSN 2296-701X.
- Ranjard, Louis; Withers, Sarah J.; Brunton, Dianne H.; Ross, Howard A.; Parsons, Stuart (1 May 2015). "Integration over song classification replicates: Song variant analysis in the hihi". The Journal of the Acoustical Society of America. 137 (5): 2542–2551. Bibcode:2015ASAJ..137.2542R. doi:10.1121/1.4919329. hdl:1885/151977. ISSN 0001-4966. PMID 25994687.
- Parker, Kevin A.; Anderson, Marti J.; Jenkins, Peter F.; Brunton, Dianne H. (2012). "The effects of translocation-induced isolation and fragmentation on the cultural evolution of bird song". Ecology Letters. 15 (8): 778–785. Bibcode:2012EcolL..15..778P. doi:10.1111/j.1461-0248.2012.01797.x. PMID 22590997.
- Brunton, D. H.; Evans, B.; Cope, T.; Ji, W. (2008). "A test of the dear enemy hypothesis in female New Zealand bellbirds (Anthornis melanura): female neighbors as threats". Behavioral Ecology. 19 (4): 791–798. doi:10.1093/beheco/arn027.
- Brunton, Dianne H.; Li, Xiaoling (2005). "The song structure and seasonal patterns of vocal behavior of male and female bellbirds (Anthornis melanura)". Journal of Ethology. 24 (1): 17–25. doi:10.1007/s10164-005-0155-5. S2CID 13630657.
- Brunton, Dianne H.; Stamp, Rosalie (2007). "Seasonal and habitat-related changes in population density of North Island Saddlebacks (Philesturnus rufusater) on a small island: using distance sampling to determine variation". Emu. 107 (3): 196–202. Bibcode:2007EmuAO.107..196B. doi:10.1071/MU06051. S2CID 84242152.
- Constantine, Rochelle; Brunton, Dianne H.; Dennis, Todd (2004). "Dolphin-watching tour boats change bottlenose dolphin (Tursiops truncatus) behaviour". Biological Conservation. 117 (3): 299–307. Bibcode:2004BCons.117..299C. doi:10.1016/j.biocon.2003.12.009.
- Brunton, Dianne H. (1997). "Impacts of Predators: Center Nests Are Less Successful than Edge Nests in a Large Nesting Colony of Least Terns". The Condor. 99 (2): 372–380. doi:10.2307/1369943. JSTOR 1369943.
- Brunton, Dianne H. (1990). "The effects of nesting stage, sex, and type of predator on parental defense by killdeer (Charadrius vociferous): testing models of avian parental defense". Behavioral Ecology and Sociobiology. 26 (3): 181–190. doi:10.1007/bf00172085. hdl:2027.42/46896. ISSN 0340-5443. S2CID 25058409.

== See also ==
- Birdsong
- Tiritiri Matangi
