= Kit Kovacs =

Canadian marine mammal researcher

- Education: BSc York University; MSc Lakehead University; PhD University of Guelph
- Scientific career
- Fields: Marine mammal biology
- Workplaces: Norwegian Polar Institute; University Centre in Svalbard; University of Waterloo

Kit Kovacs is a marine mammal researcher, best known for her work on biology, conservation and management of whales and seals. She is based at the Norwegian Polar Institute (NPI), Tromsø and is an adjunct professor of biology, marine biology, at the University Centre in Svalbard (UNIS).

== Early life and education ==
Kovacs was born in Germany (while her father was on military service for Canada) and has Canadian and Norwegian citizenship. She received her H.B.Sc. (Biology) in 1979 from York University, Toronto, Canada. In 1982, she was awarded a Master of Science degree in Biology by the Lakehead University at Thunder Bay. Her doctorate (Ph.D) in Zoology was awarded by the University of Guelph (Guelph) in 1986.

== Research career ==
Kovacs' teaching career, close to 40 years, started as an assistant professor at the University of Waterloo. She is now the Svalbard Programme Leader for Norwegian Polar Institute at the Norwegian Polar Institute, as well as a professor of biology at University Studies on Svalbard (UNIS).

During her 40-year-long research career, Kovacs has studied marine mammal population ecology, biology conservation and management, including satellite tagging of bowhead whales since 2010, the biopsy sampling of whales since 2006, and extensive research on seals Kovacs has published over 300 publications, receiving over 18,000 citations, resulting in an h-index and i10-index of 69 and 226 respectively. Kovacs has also successfully facilitated cooperation between the tourism industry and researchers in the Arctic region.

== Service ==
Kovacs has been the president of the Society for Marine Mammalogy. She now plays an advisory role as Past President for Life, and is currently serving her third term as the chair of the IUCN's Pinniped Specialist Group. She served as a representative to the Standing Scientific Group – Life Science under SCAR from 2012 to 2015, and as a member of Norway's delegation to the Scientific Committee for the Conservation of Antarctic Marine Living Resources.

Kovacs has held offices of chairman to the Academic User's Board of the Huntsman Marine Science Centre (1985–1992), a member of the board of directors for the Huntsman Marine Science Centre (1990–1994), was the secretary of the Canadian National Council for the International Union of Biological Studies (NSERC) from 1989 to 1992, and editorial board bember for the Canadian Journal of Zoology from 1990 to 1994, a board member for the Arctic Light and Heat (ALV) Programme from Jan 1997– December 31, 2002, at the Norwegian National Research Council, the president of the International Society for Marine Mammalogy from 2004 to 2006 and is still a member of its scientific advisory council and conservation council, a member of the Arctic Climate Biodiversity's Impact Assessment Working Group, as well as a contributing author to the ACIA (Arctic Climate Impact Assessment) report in Chapter 9: Marine Systems and Chapter 11: Management and Conservation of Wildlife in a Changing Arctic Environment.

Kovacs was a committee member in 2003–2006 for the Natural Environment Research Council (NERC, United Kingdom) Special Committee on Seals (SCOS). Kovacs was an International coordinator for the Ringed Seal Circumpolar Network at the Conservation of Arctic Flora and Fauna (CAFF) from 2000 to 2008, a member and leader of the Impacts on Sea Ice Reductions in the NorACIA (Norwegian Arctic Climate Impact Assessment) – Group III, as well as a member of the Barend Sea Advisory Group at NorACIA.

Kovacs is currently on the steering committee for the IUCN Species Survival Commission (SSC) Climate Change Specialist Group, a member of the Biodiversity Centre Programme Scientific Committee (Polar Environmental Centre) since 2001, has been on the Scientific Advisory Board Member for the American Cetacean Society since 2004, serves on the Committee for Scientific Advisers and the Conservation Committee for the Society for Marine Mammalogy, is a member of the Norwegian Scientific Academy for Polar Research and is on the EU Life Sciences Standing Committee, representing Norway.

Kovacs was also the leader of Marine Mammals Exploring the Oceans Pole to Pole (MEOP) project during the International Polar Year, and worked on the Barents Sea walrus Ecology project, which focused on studying stock structure, movement patterns and general ecology of Barents Sea walruses in collaboration with Russia (2014–15) and on Pechora walrus abundance, which focused on the abundance determination of Pechora Sea walruses in collaboration with Russia (2011–12).

== Awards and honors ==
- Lakehead University Graduate Entrance Scholarship (1979/80)
- Thunder Bay Field Naturalists' Award (1980/81)
- Ontario Graduate Scholarship (1980–1982)
- AOU Best Student Paper Award (1081/81)
- Multiple NSERC Postgraduate Science Scholarships (1981/82, 1982/83, 1983/84)
- Commonwealth Scholarship (1982/83)
- University of Guelph Graduate Fellowship (1982/83)
- Norman James Aquatic Mammals Fellowship in 1985
- NSERC/NATO Postdoctoral Fellowship (1986/87)
