= William F. Perrin =

American biologist (1938–2022)

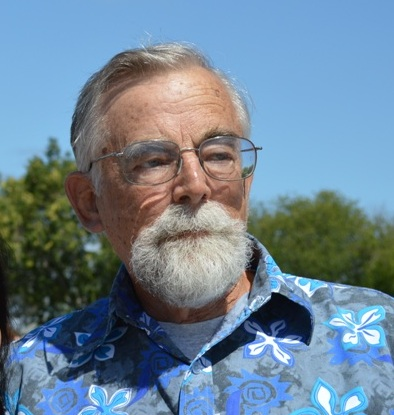
- Born: August 20, 1938
- Died: July 11, 2022 (aged 83)
- Occupation: Marine Mammal Biologist

William F. Perrin (August 20, 1938 – July 11, 2022) was an American biologist specializing in the fields of cetacean taxonomy, reproductive biology, and conservation biology. He is best known for his work documenting the unsustainable mortality of hundreds of thousands of dolphins per year in the tuna purse-seine fishery of the eastern tropical Pacific. This work became a primary motivation for the U.S. Marine Mammal Protection Act (1972). His work on cetacean taxonomy was acknowledged in 2002 when a newly recognized species of beaked whale, Perrin's beaked whale (Mesoplodon perrini), which was named in his honor (Dalebout 2002).

== Biography ==
Perrin was born in Oconto Falls, Wisconsin. He obtained a B.Sc. in biology (1966) from San Diego State University and a Ph.D. (1972) from the University of California, Los Angeles. His PhD co-advisers were Carl Leavitt Hubbs and Kenneth S. Norris. Perrin worked most of his career for the U.S. Government, initially for the Bureau of Commercial Fisheries (1966–1970) and later for the National Oceanic and Atmospheric Administration (1970–2013) at the Southwest Fisheries Science Center in La Jolla, California. He taught and advised graduate students at Scripps Institution of Oceanography.

== Selected bibliography ==
- Perrin, W. F. (1975). "Distribution and differentiation of populations of dolphins of the genus Stenella in the eastern tropical Pacific". Journal of the Fisheries Research Board of Canada 32:1059–1067.
- Perrin, W. F., R. B. Miller and P. A. Sloan (1977). "Reproductive parameters of the offshore spotted dolphin, a geographical form of Stenella attenuata, in the eastern tropical Pacific, 1973–75". Fishery Bulletin (U.S.) 75:629–633.
- Perrin, W. F. 1975. "Distribution and differentiation of populations of dolphins of the genus Stenella in the eastern tropical Pacific". Journal of the Fisheries Research Board of Canada 32:1059–1067.
- Perrin, W. F., R. L. Brownell, Jr. and D. P. DeMaster (eds.). (1984) "Reproduction in whales, dolphins and porpoises". Report of the International Whaling Commission Special Issue 6.
- Perrin, W. F., E. D. Mitchell, J. G. Mead, D. K. Caldwell, M. C. Caldwell, P. J. H. van Bree and W. H. Dawbin. (1987). "Revision of the spotted dolphins, Stenella spp." Marine Mammal Science 3:99–170.
- Perrin, W. F., G. P. Donovan and J. Barlow (eds). (1994). "Gillnets and cetaceans". Report of the International Whaling Commission Special Issue 15.
- Perrin, W. F. (2002). "Stenella frontalis". Mammalian Species 702.
- Perrin, W. F., K. M. Robertson, P. J. H. van Bree and J. G. Mead. (2007). "Cranial description and genetic identity of the holotype specimen of Tursiops aduncus (Ehrenberg, 1832)". Marine Mammal Science 23:342–357.
- Perrin, W. F., B. Würsig and J. G. M. Thewissen (eds.). (2009). Encyclopedia of Marine Mammals. Second Edition. Academic Press, Amsterdam.

== Honors and awards ==
- Department of Commerce Bronze Medal, 1994
- New whale species named in his honor (Mesoplodon perrini)
- K. S. Norris Lifetime Achievement Award, Society for Marine Mammalogy, 2011

== Positions held ==
- NOAA senior scientist, Southwest Fisheries Science Center (1984–2013)
- President, Society for Marine Mammalogy (1987–1988)
- Editor, Marine Mammal Science (1996–2000)
- Associate editor, Journal of Mammalogy (2007–2011)
- Chair, Small Cetaceans Sub-committee of the International Whaling Commission Scientific Committee (1979–1984, 1987–1990)
- Chair, IUCN Species Survival Commission Cetacean Specialist Group (1984–1990, member 1977–present)
- Committee of Scientific Advisors, U.S. Marine Mammal Commission (chair 1991–1994, member 1980–1983, 1990)
- Chair, Cetacean Red List Authority, IUCN (2006–2013)
- Chair, Society for Marine Mammalogy Taxonomy Committee (2010–2016)
- Scientific Councilor for Aquatic Mammals and Large Fishes, Convention on Migratory Species (1991–2014)

== PhD students advised ==
- Brent S Stewart (UCLA 1989)
- Maria Christina Pinedo (UCSB 1991)
- Patricia Rosel (UCSD 1992)
- Frederick I. Archer, II (UCSD 1996)
- Richard LeDuc (UCSD 1997)
- Sergio Escorza Treviño (UCSD 1998)
- Luana Garrison (UCSD 2001)
- Aimée Lang (USCD)
- Nicholas Kellar (UCSD)
