= Kate Robb =

Australian marine mammalogist

Kate Robb is an Australian marine mammalogist who, along with colleagues, declared in 2011 a new species of the genus Tursiops, and formally named it the Burrunan dolphin, Tursiops australis. She is the founding director and head of research at the Marine Mammal Foundation in Melbourne in the Australian state of Victoria.

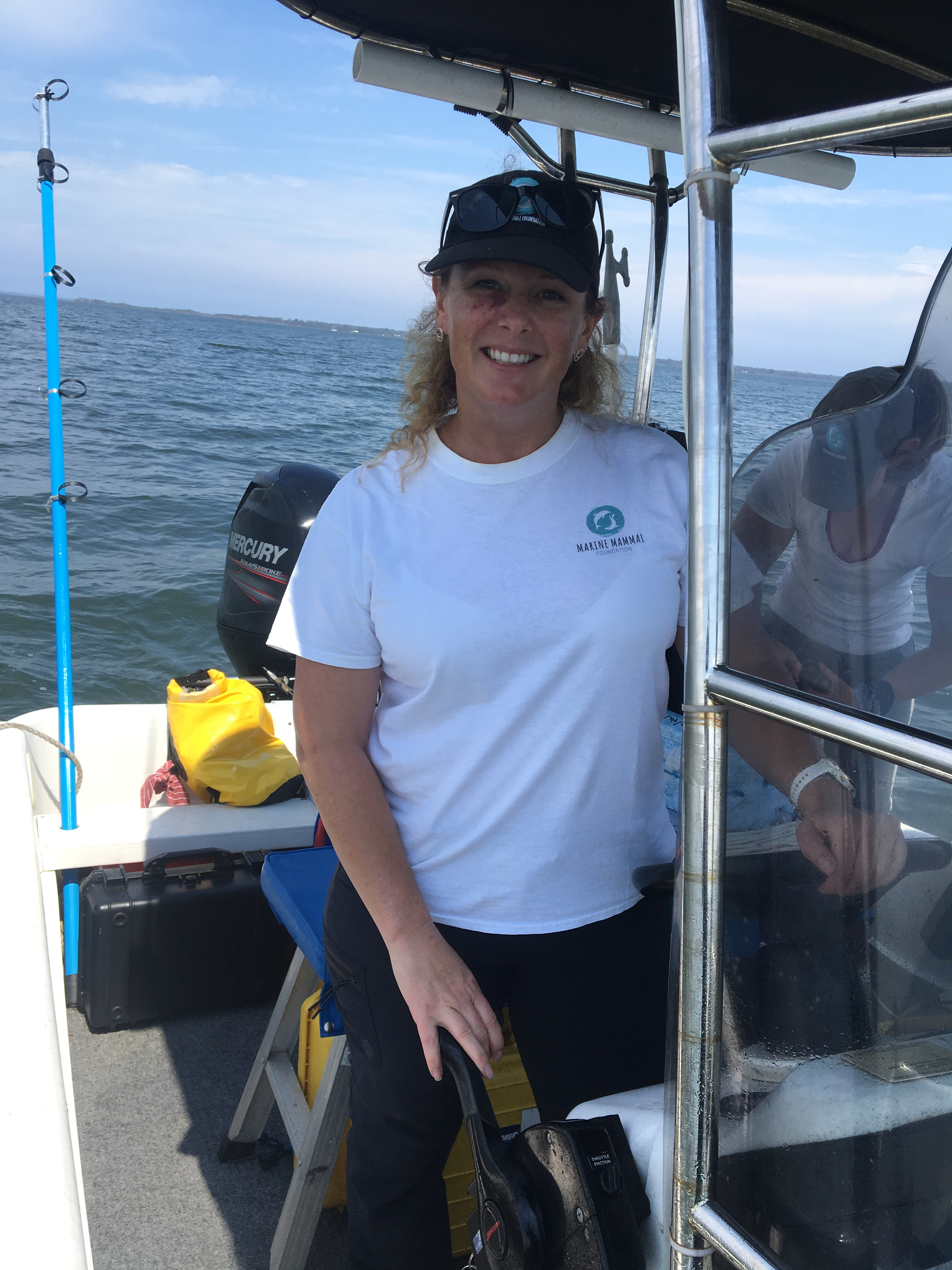
Dr. Kate Robb, Marine Mammal Foundation

With nearly 20 years experience researching dolphins across southern Australia, Robb achieved a Bachelor of Science (Hons) with a double major in freshwater and marine ecology and zoology and a Doctor of Philosophy (genetics). She is the former president of the Australian Marine Sciences Associations – Victorian branch, a Naturalist for expeditions to Antarctica, and an Honorary Fellow at Deakin and Curtin universities.

As head of research at the Marine Mammal Foundation, Robb has instigated and supervised numerous applied marine mammal research projects covering robust population modelling, population genetics and phylogenomics, geospatial mapping, social structure and alliance, acoustics and toxicology. She has numerous peer-reviewed scientific publications aimed at informing positive conservation and management outcomes of marine mammals.

Robb has been involved with major media coverage from international agencies such as BBC's History Channel, National Geographic, BBC The World, NBC USA; Australian agencies such as The Age, The Australian and Herald-Sun; major TV news networks; and children's shows such as Totally Wild and Scope. A highlight of Robb's career was personally meeting Sir David Attenborough in 2013.

== Select publications ==
- Puszka, H., Shimeta, J., Robb, K. (2021) Assessment on the effectiveness of vessel-approach regulations to protect cetaceans in Australia: A review on behavioral impacts with case study on the threatened Burrunan dolphin (Tursiops australis).PLoS ONE. https://doi.org/10.1371/journal.pone.0243353
- Duignan, P.J., Stephens, N.S. & Robb, K. (2020) Fresh water skin disease in dolphins: a case definition based on pathology and environmental factors in Australia. Sci Rep 10, 21979. https://doi.org/10.1038/s41598-020-78858-2
- Speakman, C., Johnstone, C., Robb, K. (2019) Increased alertness behavior in Australian fur seals (Arctocephalus pusillus doriferus) at a high vessel traffic haul-out site. Marine Mammal Science. https://doi.org/10.1111/mms.12654
- Foord, C.S., Rowe, K.M.C., Robb, K. (2019) Cetacean biodiversity, spatial and temporal trends based on stranding records (1920-2016), Victoria, Australia. PLoS ONE doi.org/10.1371/journal.pone.0223712
- Charlton-Robb, K., Taylor, A.C., McKechnie, S.W. (2016) Population genetic structure of the Burrunan dolphin (Tursiops australis) in coastal waters of south-eastern Australia: conservation implications. Conservation Genetics. doi:10.1007/s10592-014-0652-6
- Monk, A., Charlton-Robb. K., Buddhadasa, S. Thompson, R.M. (2014) Comparison of Mercury Contamination in Live and Dead Dolphins from a Newly Described Species, Tursiops australis. PLoS ONE 9(8):e104887. https://doi.org/10.1371/journal.pone.0104887
- Rayner, G., Charlton-Robb, K., Thompson, C., Hughes, T. (2013) Interdisciplinary Collaboration to Integrate Inquiry-Oriented Learning in Undergraduate Science Practicals. International Journal of Innovation in Science and Mathematics Education 21(5):1-11
- Papakonstantinou, T., Charlton-Robb, K., Reina, R.D., Rayner, G. (2013) Providing research-focused work-integrated learning for high achieving science undergraduates. Asia-Pacific Journal of Cooperative Education. 14(2):59-73.
- Charlton-Robb, K., Gershwin L., Thompson, R., Austin, J., Owen, K., and McKechnie, S.W. (2011) A New Dolphin Species, the Burrunan Dolphin Tursiops australis sp. nov., Endemic to Southern Australian Coastal Waters. PLoS ONE 6(9): e24047. doi:10.1371/journal.pone.0024047
- Owen, K., Charlton-Robb, K., Thompson, R. (2011) Resolving the Trophic Relations of Cryptic Species: An Example Using Stable Isotope Analysis of Dolphin Teeth. PLoS ONE 6(2): e16457. doi:10.1371/journal.pone.0016457
- Moller, L., Bilgmann, K., Charlton-Robb, K., Beheregaray, L. (2008) Multi-gene evidence for a new bottlenose dolphin species in southern Australia. Molecular Phylogenetics and Evolution 49:674-681.
- Charlton, K., Taylor, A.C., McKechnie, S.W. (2006) A note on divergent mtDNA lineages of "bottlenose" dolphins from coastal waters of southern Australia. J. Cetacean Res. Manage 8(2), 173-179
