= Marine Mammal Science =

- Discipline: Mammalogy
- Language: English
- Edited by: Daryl J. Boness

Publication details
- History: 1985–present
- Publisher: Wiley-Blackwell
- Frequency: Quarterly
- Impact factor: 1.665 (2015)

Standard abbreviations
- ISO 4: Mar. Mammal Sci.

Indexing
- CODEN: MMSCEC
- ISSN: 0824-0469 (print); 1748-7692 (web)
- LCCN: 86641033
- OCLC no.: 637552943

Links
- Journal homepage; Online access; Online archive

Marine Mammal Science is a quarterly peer-reviewed scientific journal covering all topics about or related to marine mammals. It is published by Wiley-Blackwell on behalf of The Society for Marine Mammalogy. According to the Journal Citation Reports, the journal has a 2015 impact factor of 1.665.
