= Society for Marine Mammalogy =

- Founded: 1981
- Region served: Worldwide
- Key people: President: Simon Goldsworthy; President-Elect: Jeremy Kiszka; Immediate Past President: Charles Littnan; Secretary: Cindy Peter; Treasurer: Dee Allen
- Publication: Marine Mammal Science
- Website: www.marinemammalscience.org

The Society for Marine Mammalogy was founded in 1981 and is the largest international association of marine mammal scientists in the world.

== Mission ==
The mission of the Society for Marine Mammalogy (SMM) is to promote the global advancement of marine mammal science and contribute to its relevance and impact in education, conservation and management.

== Objectives ==
- Evaluate and promote the educational, scientific and managerial advancement of marine mammal science.
- Gather and disseminate to members of the Society, the public, and public and private institutions, scientific, technical and management information through publications and meetings.
- Provide scientific information, as required, on matters related to the conservation and management of marine mammal resources.

== History ==
The Biennial Conferences on the Biology of Marine Mammals predate the founding of the Society. The Biennial Conferences were a successor to Tom Poulter's "Annual Conference on Biological Sonar and Diving Mammals" held at the Stanford Research Institute (formally separated from Stanford University in 1970 and now known as SRI International) in Menlo Park, California, beginning in 1964. Dr. Kenneth S. Norris of UC Santa Cruz founded the First Biennial Conference on the Biology of Marine Mammals, hosted by UC Santa Cruz in 1975. About 300 people attended the conference. A second Biennial in San Diego followed in 1977, supported by the U.S. Naval Ocean Systems Center, with about 480 people attending. Following the second conference, George Yost Harry, then director of what is now the Marine Mammal Laboratory in Seattle, initiated discussions about forming a society to organize and run the conferences. In 1978, Norris prepared a "Preliminary Design of a Society of Marine Mammalogy" and formed an organizational committee (consisting of Tom Dohl, George Harry, Burney LeBeouf, John C. Lilly, Ken Norris, Bill Perrin, Bill Powell and Forrest Wood, later expanded to include Bob Elsner, Bill Evans, Lou Herman and Ron Schusterman). The new society would "provide a vehicle for promoting the science of marine mammalogy." Proposed functions:

- Organize and sponsor regular meetings
- Sponsor workshops on special topics of interest
- Work to improve the quality of scientific work being done on marine mammals
- Provide for information exchange among marine mammalogists
- Provide a voice in social decision-making from the leadership in marine mammalogy
- Perhaps ultimately produce a journal for marine mammalogy and provide for its editorship

The committee met during the Third Biennial in Seattle in 1979 and discussed the preliminary design, proposed criteria for membership, and suggested by-laws. All was firmed up by correspondence, and at the Fourth Biennial in San Francisco in 1981, Norris presented the need and plans for a society to a meeting of those conference participants interested in forming one. The proposal was accepted by the group, and Norris was elected the first President by consensus. He then launched into the knotty tasks of confirming charter members, drafting a constitution and by-laws, getting the Society officially incorporated, recruiting people to act as interim Secretary, Treasurer and chairs of the committees on membership and nominations/elections, and helping start organization of the Fifth Biennial and the first full election. Attendance has grown from the 300 in 1975 to more than 2000 in some years.

The next major step for the Society after its formation in 1981 was the creation of a new journal devoted to the biology of marine mammals. Titles proposed included Journal of Marine Mammalogy, Marine Mammals, and others, but Marine Mammal Science won out. The first issue appeared in 1985. Joe Geraci was the first Editor, followed by Doug Wartzok, William F. (Bill) Perrin, Don Bowen, Jim Estes, and Daryl Boness (current). The first book-length special publication of the Society appeared in 1987 (Marine Mammal Energetics, edited by Huntley et al.), followed by The Bowhead Whale (1993, Burns et al., eds), Molecular Genetics of Marine Mammals (Dizon et al., eds) and Marine Mammals of the World (Rice, 1998).

=== Past Presidents ===
- Simon Goldsworthy, 2023-2025, Australia
- Charles Littnan 2020–2023, USA
- D. Ann Pabst 2018–2020, USA
- Jay Barlow 2016–2018, USA
- Nick Gales 2014–2016, Australia
- Helene Marsh 2012–2014, Australia
- Randall S. Wells 2010–2012, USA
- Andrew J. Read 2008–2010, USA
- John E. Reynolds III 2006–2008, USA
- Kit M. Kovacs 2004–2006, Norway
- Paul Nachtigall 2002–2004, USA
- Daniel K. Odell 2000–2002, USA
- Douglas P. DeMaster 1998–2000, USA
- Ian Stirling 1996–1998, Canada
- Jeanette A. Thomas 1994–1996, USA
- Bernd Würsig 1992–1994, USA
- Christina Lockyer 1990–1992, United Kingdom
- Robert L. Brownell Jr. 1989–1990, USA
- William F. Perrin 1987–1989, USA
- James G. Mead 1985–1987, USA
- Kenneth S. Norris (deceased) 1981–1985, USA

== Conservation ==
The Society for Marine Mammalogy recognizes the numerous threats and challenges faced by marine mammals around the world. To address these issues of concern, the SMM employs three strategies:

- Presidential Letters which are sent to management bodies to encourage their efforts to sustain marine mammal populations.
- Society Resolutions which provide guidance to Society members and the general public on how to approach significant problems faced by marine mammals and their populations.
- Panel Discussions. Leading scientific experts with a range of skills and perspectives convene to educate members by discussing the science relevant to important and complex issues facing marine mammalogists.

== Conferences ==
The Society for Marine Mammalogy holds international meetings every two years, with the goal of enhancing collaboration, sharing ideas, and improving the quality of research on marine mammals within the scientific community. The gathering of interdisciplinary experts enables discussion amongst marine mammal scientists and policy makers, enhancing collaboration and training the next generation of scientists and practitioners, and is a key opportunity to foster international partnerships and collaborations. In addition to key-note lectures and oral presentations, there are generally over 1,000 poster presentations in addition to topical workshops on hot topics in marine mammal science.

=== Forthcoming Conference ===
The Society for Marine Mammalogy holds biennial international meetings with the goal of enhancing collaboration, sharing ideas, and improving the quality of research on marine mammals within the scientific community. In October 2026, the Society for Marine Mammalogy will host its 26th Biennial Conference. The conference will take place in Puerto Rico. The meeting will bring together leaders in the field from more than 75 countries on seven continents. The gathering of interdisciplinary experts enables discussion amongst marine mammal scientists and policy makers, enhancing collaboration and training the next generation of scientists and practitioners, and is a key opportunity to foster international partnerships and collaborations.

=== Past Conferences ===
- 2024 – 25th Biennial Conference, Perth, Western Australia, 11–15 November
- 2022 – 24th Biennial Conference, West Palm Beach, Florida, USA, 1–4 August
- 2019 – 23nd Biennial Conference – World Marine Mammal Conference, Barcelona, Spain, 9–12 December
- 2017 – 22nd Biennial Conference, Halifax, Nova Scotia, Canada, 23–27 October
- 2015 – 21st Biennial Conference, San Francisco, California, USA, 13–17 December
- 2013 – 20th Biennial Conference, Dunedin, New Zealand, 9–13 December
- 2011 – 19th Biennial Conference, Tampa, Florida, USA, 26 November – 2 December
- 2009 – 18th Biennial Conference, Quebec City, Canada, 12–16 October
- 2007 – 17th Biennial Conference, Cape Town, South Africa, 29 November – 3 December
- 2005 – 16th Biennial Conference, San Diego, California, USA, 12–16 December
- 2003 – 15th Biennial Conference, Greensboro, North Carolina, USA, 14–19 December
- 2001 – 14th Biennial Conference, Vancouver, British Columbia, Canada, 28 November – 3 December
- 1999 – 13th Biennial Conference, Maui, Hawaii, USA, 28 November – 3 December
- 1998 – 12th Biennial Conference – World Marine Mammal Science Conference, Monte Carlo, Monaco, 20–25 January
- 1995 – 11th Biennial Conference, Orlando, Florida, USA, 14–18 December
- 1993 – 10th Biennial Conference, Galveston, Texas, USA, 11–15 November
- 1991 – 9th Biennial Conference, Chicago, Illinois, USA, 5–9 December
- 1989 – 8th Biennial Conference, Pacific Grove, California, USA, 7–11 December
- 1987 – 7th Biennial Conference, Miami, Florida, USA, 5–9 December
- 1985 – 6th Biennial Conference, Vancouver, British Columbia, Canada, 22–26 November
- 1983 – 5th Biennial Conference, Boston, Massachusetts, USA, 27 November – 1 December
- 1981 – 4th Biennial Conference, San Francisco, California, USA, 14–18 December
- 1979 – 3rd Biennial Conference, Seattle, Washington, USA, 7–11 October
- 1977 – 2nd Biennial Conference, San Diego, California, USA, 12–15 December
- 1975 – 1st Biennial Conference, Santa Cruz, California, USA, 4–7 December

== Membership ==
As of 2024, the Society has over 1,700 members in 56 countries. About 55% of members reside in the USA.

== Marine Mammal Science ==
The Society produces the scientific journal Marine Mammal Science. Marine Mammal Science publishes significant new findings on marine mammals resulting from original research on their form and function, evolution, systematics, physiology, biochemistry, behavior, population biology, life history, genetics, ecology and conservation.
