= List of honorary doctors of the University of Auckland =

The list of Honorary Doctors of the University of Auckland below shows the recipients of honorary doctorates conferred by the University of Auckland since 1962.

Year	Recipient	Degree
1963	Keith Bullen	DSc
1963	William Goodfellow	LLD
1963	Alexander Macbeath	LittD
1963	Norman Spencer	LLD
1964	Leslie Munro	LLD
1965	Arthur Geoffrey Davis	LLD
1965	Alexander Turner	LLD
1965	Francis John Turner	DSc
1966	Queen Elizabeth The Queen Mother	LLD
1967	Ronald Algie	LLD
1967	Jack Richard Butland	LLD
1967	Alexander Hugh McDonald	LittD
1969	Douglas Robb	LLD
1970	James Liston	LLD
1970	Kenneth John Maidment	LLD
1970	William Arthur Sewell	LittD
1970	Charles Andrew Sharp	LittD
1972	Wilton Ernest Henley	LLD
1974	Henry Cooper	LLD
1974	Charles Fleming	DSc
1974	Frank Sargeson	LittD
1976	Roy McElroy	LittD
1976	Martin Sullivan	LittD
1978	Raymond Firth	LittD
1978	Walter Scheel	LLD
1978	William Stevenson	DSc
1983	David Beattie	LLD
1983	Ted Bollard	DSc
1983	Arthur Oswald Michael Gilmour	DSc
1983	Kiri Te Kanawa	MusD
1983	Eric McCormick	LittD
1983	Lewis Nathan Ross	LLD
1983	Graham Speight	LLD
1983	Eruera Kawhia Stirling	LLD
1983	Dorothy Winstone	LLD
1983	Leslie Colin Woods	DSc
1986	Harcourt Caughey	LLD
1986	Lindo Ferguson	LLD
1986	James Hēnare	LLD
1986	Dennis McEldowney	LittD
1986	Kendrick Smithyman	LittD
1991	Lucy Cranwell	DSc
1991	Pakariki Harrison	LittD
1991	Vaughan Jones	DSc
1991	Janetta McStay	MusD
1991	Maurice Paykel	LittD
1991	Catherine Tizard	LLD
1992	Mick Brown	LLD
1992	Anastasios Christodoulou	LLD
1992	Donald McIntyre	MusD
1994	Colin Maiden	LLD
1996	Sadako Ogata	LLD
1996	Nicholas Tarling	LittD
1997	Maurice Shadbolt	LittD
1998	Bridget Ogilvie	DSc
1999	Ian Barker	LLD
1999	Sian Elias	LLD
1999	Maurice Gee	LittD
1999	Douglas Goodfellow	LLD
1999	Merimeri Penfold	LittD
1999	Takutai Wikiriwhi	D(UoA)
2001	George Beca	DEng
2001	Ron Carter	DEng
2001	Kenneth Keith	LLD
2001	Joan Metge	LittD
2001	Tom Schnackenberg	DEng
2001	Harold Titter	D(UoA)
2001	Miles Warren	D(UoA)
2002	Allen Curnow	LittD
2002	Graeme Davies	DEng
2004	Andrew Gurr	LittD
2004	John Hood	LLD
2004	Elizabeth Smither	LittD
2005	Gus Fisher	LLD
2005	John Graham	LittD
2005	Ralph Hotere	LittD
2005	Douglas Myers	LLD
2005	Ngũgĩ wa Thiong'o	LittD
2005	Hone Tuwhare	LittD
2006	Patrick Hanan	LittD
2006	Paul Knox Kelly	LLD
2006	Lu Yongxiang	DEng
2006	Anand Satyanand	LLD
2007	Alan Bollard	LLD
2007	Bruce Hadden	LLD
2008	Jenny Gibbs	LittD
2008	Vincent O'Sullivan	LittD
2008	Robert Winston	DSc
2009	Elizabeth Caffin	LittD
2010	Helen Clark	LLD
2011	José Manuel Barroso	LLD
2012	Hugh Fletcher	LLD
2012	Owen Glenn	LLD
2014	Ban Ki-moon	LLD
2014	Peter Blanchard	LLD
2014	Graeme Douglas	LLD
2014	David Levene	LLD
2015	Neal Plowman	LLD
2015	Geoff Ricketts	LLD
2016	Richard Aitken	DEng
2016	Charles Bidwell	LLD
2016	Roger France	LLD
2016	Marti Friedlander	LittD
2016	George Mason	DSc
2016	Julian Robertson	LLD
2019	Beate Schuler	DSc
2019	Ian Parton	DEng
2019	David Mace	LLD
2021	Joe Hawke	LLD
2022	Ramari Stewart	DSc
2023	Kaa Williams	LittD
2023	Tawhiri Williams	LittD
2023	Kate Edger	LittD
2023	Bruce McLaren	DEng
2023	Hugh Kāwharu	LLD
2023	Epeli Hauʻofa	LittD
