= Offshore energy regulation about impact on maritime fauna =

Form of environmental legislation

The development of offshore energy, which includes but is not limited to wind turbines, tidal energy, and oil and gas extraction, has expanded since the early 21st Century. Given this increase, there are increasing concerns about the potential impacts on large maritime fauna such as cetaceans and birds, particularly in coastal areas of high biodiversity. Environmental advocacy groups and scholars have documented risks including underwater noise that disturbs marine life populations, the displacement or destruction of marine habitats, fauna mortalities from collisions, and broader disturbances.

There are varied regulatory frameworks governing the mitigation of ecological harm while still permitting offshore energy development. These frameworks, often region-specific, combine binding legislation that limits the production of energy without considering marine life, recommends or mandates environmental impact assessments (EIAs), promotes technical guidance, or bans development altogether. These approaches generally vary by region and reflect differing systems of governance, regional approaches to conversation, and the priorities of marine life risk mitigation.

== European Regulations ==
=== European Union ===
Governed by the precautionary principle, The European Union maintains some of the strictest approaches to regulating offshore energy production as it relates to marine biodiversity. Offshore energy production is tied to the EU Birds Directive and EU Habitats directive, which combined with Natura 2000, requires member states to prevent the destruction, violation, or harm to protected species habitats, and additional designated areas, including those affected by offshore infrastructure. As laid out in these directives, even areas that are not off-shore (beyond off-shore energy site boundaries) may be affected by offshore-production, which further limits energy production.

As a result of these directives, offshore energy permits are issued only after thorough review and assessment of the potential adverse effects in accordance with EU nature legislation. Offshore energy projects likely to affect protected species or habitats may be delayed or refused permitting altogether. A crucial component of this regulation is the Marine Strategy Framework Directive, which requires member states to achieve “good environmental status in marine waters.” This includes, but is not limited to, reducing underwater noise, limited anthropogenic sound, and mitigating harm to ecosystems via construction projects.

=== Europe Outside of the EU ===
Beyond the European Union, the OSPAR Convention both regulates and limits the quantity of underwater noise (as it relates to all activities, not simply offshore energy production). Recognizing underwater noise as harmful to marine populations of large fauna, OSPAR's 2025 report laid out both action plans and targets for reducing both ambient noise from energy production and high-intensity noise from energy production construction to limit ecosystem damage.

Specifically for the protection of cetaceans, the Agreement on the Conservation of Cetaceans of the Black Sea, Mediterranean Sea and Contiguous Atlantic Area (ACCOBAMS) is a binding treaty that establishes guidelines for protecting large maritime fauna from offshore energy activities. This includes spatial planning, seasonal restrictions on construction and extraction, strict exclusion zones, and procedures established to ensure that cetaceans are not harmed during energy production.

Nationally, implementation varies from state to state despite international agreements and regulations. States such as the United Kingdom have strict standards such as those outlined by the Joint Nature Conservation Committee, which requires the deployment of marine mammal observations, monitoring of wildlife populations, and monitoring of activities such as seismic surveys and pile driving.

While Europe maintains the highest level of regulation of offshore wind production for the protection of marine fauna, conservation organizations have noted that enforcement is varied and inconsistent, particularly when tied to the impact of offshore energy production on migratory seabirds and offshore wind development far from coasts, making it difficult to monitor.

== The Americas ==
=== United States ===
In the US, offshore energy regulation as it relates to large maritime fauna is largely based in environmental protection statutes, governed by laws such as the Marine Mammal Protection Act and the Endangered Species Act, both prohibiting harm to protected species and requiring federal agencies such as the EPA to assess and mitigate risks regulated to offshore energy production. Oversight over this legislation is typically exercised by NOAA and the Department of Interior's Bureau of Ocean Energy Management, which restrict permits for offshore energy production, impose speed limits for ships, monitor sound levels in the ocean, and limit seasonal energy production.

In 2024, NOAA and BOEM (Bureau of Ocean Energy Management) released its final joint strategy of the North Atlantic Right Whale Strategy, a species-specific set of directives aimed at protecting one of the world's most endangered species, identified as increasingly at risk because of offshore energy production—particularly wind turbines. While the strategy is not binding, and is not expected to result in the cancelling of leases for offshore energy production it establishes guidelines to limit noise, vessel strikes, and the entanglement of large marine fauna.

=== Canada ===
Canada has a national standard framework for offshore energy production, particularly for oil and gas production, which sets the minimum requirements for non-ice-covered waters under Canadian jurisdiction. The legislation particularly limits seismic surveys conducted to identify natural gas and oil reserves, and outlines procedures during these activities, including prescribed start ups, shutdowns, requiring the presence of a marine mammal observer, the cancelling of activities if an endangered animal is spotted, and requiring the use of cetacean detection technology.

=== Brazil ===
Regulations in Brazil are stringent for offshore energy production, with licensing requirements issued by the national environmental authority, IBAMA. Just as in Canada, the Brazilian regulations require exclusion zones, soft-start and hard-stop procedures, continuous monitoring using marine mammal observers, passive acoustic monitoring systems, and cetacean detection devices.

== Oceania ==
=== Australia ===
Australian offshore energy activities are regulated by the Environment Protection and Biodiversity Conservation Act 1999 (EPBC Act), which has detailed guidance on limiting seismic surveys for the identification of natural gas and oil. As outlined for western nations, the regulations in Australia for offshore energy require established exclusion zones, soft-start procedures, and seasonal restrictions designed to protect cetaceans during breeding and migration periods.

With increasing offshore wind development in the region, the Australian government has issued reports that outline guidance for the protection of seabirds and coastal birds, finding that multiple species are at risk as new projects are underway. The Department of Climate Change, Energy, the Environment and Water recommended that Australian legislation and protections more closely mirror that of established European Regulations, which set the standard for offshore energy monitoring.

Australia also employs spatial protections, such as the banning any and all oil and gas exploration within the Great Barrier Reef Marine Park, one of the world's most sensitive ecosystems. Beyond the Great Barrier Reef, Australia's system of Commonwealth Marine Parks forbids industrial activities in areas of high marine biodiversity.

=== New Zealand ===
New Zealand's regulatory practices are similar to Australia's, with an established Code of Conduct for Minimising Acoustic Disturbance to Marine Mammals from Seismic Survey Operations, made law in 2013 by the Te Papa Atawhai, or Department of Conservation. The Code requires trained observers, real-time monitoring, and mandatory shutdowns when marine mammals are spotted entering defined safety zones, with enforcement overseen by the Environmental Protection Authority.

== Asia ==
Asia's regulatory system for regulating offshore energy production is in development, taking cues from both European and Oceanic practices. The Convention on the Conservation of Migratory Species of Wild Animals, signed by all Asian states excluding Japan, South Korea, North Korea, and Laos, recommend avoidance of sensitive periods of species migration for the construction of offshore energy products, the establishment of exclusion zones, and the adoption of quieter technologies so as to not disturb marine fauna.

=== Japan ===
Despite having not signed the CMS, Japan has recently amended existing environmental assessment legislation to extend the requirements of environmental impact assessments to offshore wind projects.

=== Bangladesh ===
Bangladesh established its first marine protected area (MPA) in 2014, with the creation of the Swatch of No Ground Marine Protected Area. This designation restricts industrial activities, including offshore drilling and seismic surveys, in a region known for a high concentration of dolphins and whales.

=== India ===
At present, India requires developers of offshore energy to identify risks to sensitive species and implement measures that would mitigate harm to species as a condition for approval of the project during the permitting process. Due to high biodiversity in Indian waters, environmental protection organizations have called for additional MPAs to be established in Indian waters to ensure greater safety for marine animals and safeguard biodiversity.

=== China ===
China is increasingly incorporating biodiversity safeguards into its national environmental assessment laws, and incorporating language from international agreements such as COP15 into its national environmental regulations. The Chinese Ministry of Ecology and Environment has stated that it will be improve its conditions for biodiversity conservation in China's offshore waters by 2030, requiring more stringent reviews of offshore energy and strengthening assessment procedures.
