= Natacha Aguilar de Soto =

Spanish marine biologist

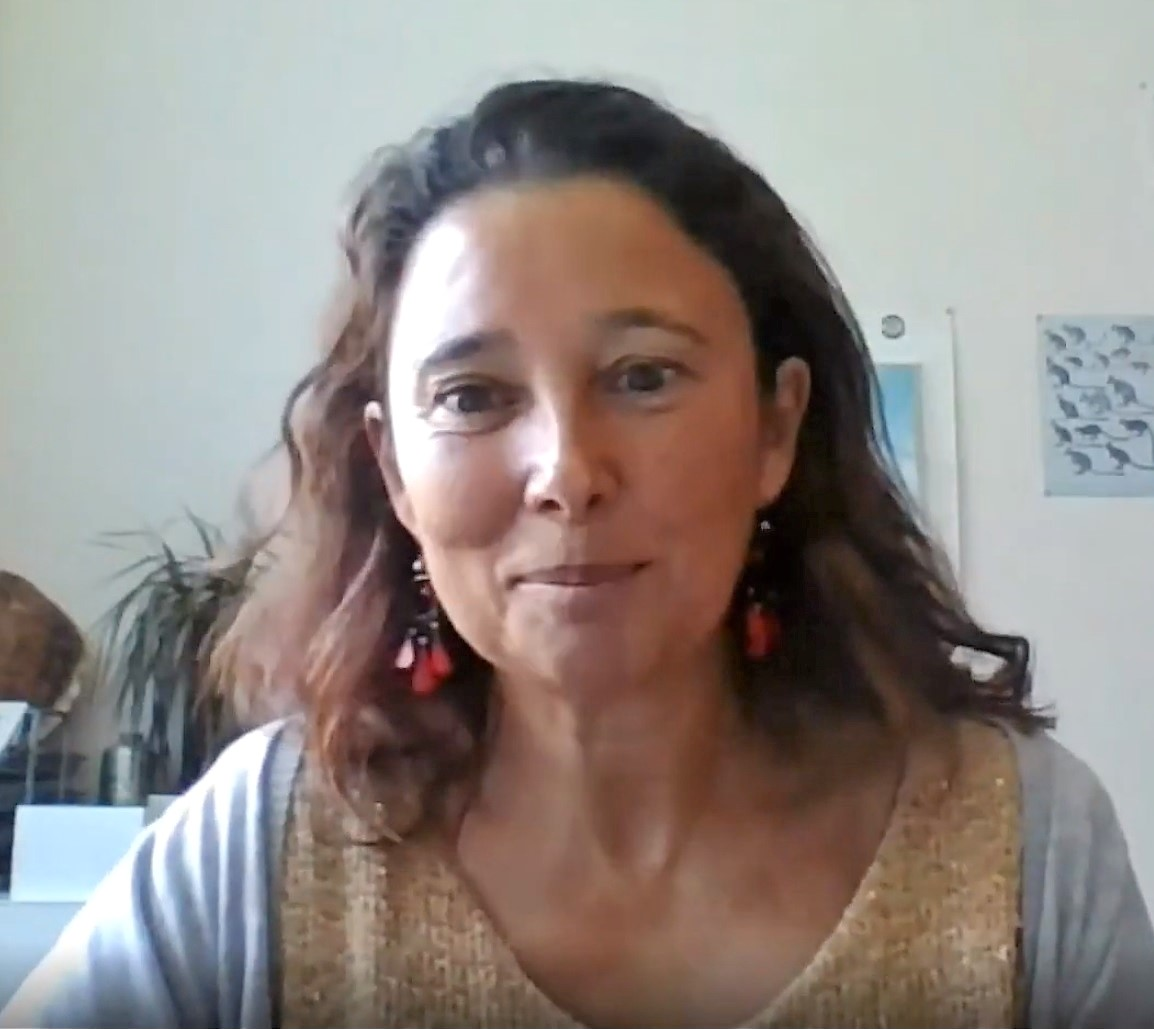
- Aguilar de Soto in 2021
- Education: University of La Laguna
- Known for: Cetacean research
- Scientific career
- Institutions: University of La Laguna, University of Saint Andrews

Natacha Aguilar de Soto is a Spanish marine biologist at the University of La Laguna (ULL), Tenerife, Canary Islands. She is a Ramón y Cajal research and teaching fellow at ULL and has been a Marie Skłodowska-Curie Research Fellow at ULL and at the Center for Research in Ecological Modeling (CREEM) of the University of St. Andrews (SMRU). She is the director of cetacean research within ULL's BIOECOMAC (Grupo de Investigación en Biodiversidad, Ecología Marina y Conservación).

Aguilar de Soto studies the diving behavior of deep-sea cetaceans including beaked whales and pilot whales. Her research on the short-finned pilot whale is causing scientists to reassess foraging models for the behavior of marine predators. She leads research on bioacoustics, acoustic ecology, and the effects of noise disturbance on cetaceans, which is influencing human management policies. Aguilar de Soto is the president and co-founder of the Asociación GIC (Grupo de Investigación de Cetáceos), and a founder of CETAVIST, the Cetacean and Seabird Sighting Network of the Canary Islands.

== Career ==
Natacha Aguilar de Soto has a doctorate in biology from the University of La Laguna (Universidad de La Laguna, ULL) in Tenerife, Canary Islands. Aguilar de Soto joined the University of La Laguna as a student, began a long-term research study observing Blainville's and Cuvier's beaked whales in 2002 and published her Ph.D. work in 2006. As a member of the BIOECOMAC (Biodiversity, Marine Ecology and Conservation) research group at ULL she is the director of research on cetaceans and bioacoustics.

Aguilar de Soto was the project manager of the SOUNDMAR project (2010–2013) at ULL, under a Marie Skłodowska-Curie Action funded by the European Union. She was the project manager of the ECOSOUND project (2015–2017) at the Center for Research in Ecological Modeling (CREEM) of the University of St. Andrews (SMRU) also funded through a Marie Skłodowska-Curie Action from the European Union, as part of the Horizon 2020 initiative. Aguilar de Soto became the Ramón y Cajal fellow at ULL in 2017.

She is the president and co-founder of the Asociación GIC (Grupo de Investigación de Cetáceos), which was established in 2003 for the study, conservation and protection of marine mammals in the Canary Islands region.

She is a founder of CETAVIST, the Cetacean and Seabird Sighting Network of the Canary Islands, which was organized in 2012 to involve citizen scientists. Volunteers observers for CETAVIST travel on passenger ferries. Between December 2012 and October 2016, they carried out 1,300 surveys of cetaceans and seabirds. The work received support from the Fundación Biodiversidad – MAGRAMA, and its records are made publicly available through the database www.aviste.me.

Aguilar de Soto has participated in expert groups examining the impact of marine noise, including ACCOBAMS (Agreement on the Conservation of Cetaceans of the Black Sea, Mediterranean Sea and Contiguous Atlantic Area), ASCOBANS (Agreement on the Conservation of Small Cetaceans of the Baltic, North East Atlantic, Irish and North Seas), and OSPAR (Convention for the Protection of the Marine Environment of the North-East Atlantic). She has participated in population density estimates for Ireland and Scotland and in mitigation initiatives for the Canary Islands New Zealand, Australia, and others. In 2019, Aguilar de Soto was named a "Hope Spot Champion" as part of a campaign to make Tenerife-La Gomera a "Hope Spot" at the center of an enlarged marine protected area.

== Research ==
Aguilar de Soto's research covers various fields, such as diving and feeding behavior, ecology and acoustic communication of deep-diving cetacean species, distribution and abundance estimates of cetaceans and seabirds, and human impact on the marine environment, especially noise pollution and cetacean collisions with boats.

Topographic map of the Canary Islands

The Canary Islands provide a home to at least twenty-six species of cetaceans, including Blainville's beaked whale (Mesoplodon densirostris), True's beaked whale (Mesoplodon mirus), Gervais's beaked whale (Mesoplodon europaeus), Cuvier's beaked whale (Ziphius cavirostris), and northern bottlenose whale (Hyperoodon ampullatus). At least five species maintain a year-round presence in the archipelago, the only place in the North Atlantic where they are known to do so. Between 1985 and 2003, at least seven mass stranding events in the area involved beaked whales at the same time that naval exercises were being carried out. In 2004, a moratorium on the use of naval sonar within 92 kilometres (57 mi; 50 nmi) of the Canary Islands was established by the Spanish Ministry of Defense, an action in accordance with resolutions by ACCOBAMS and others.

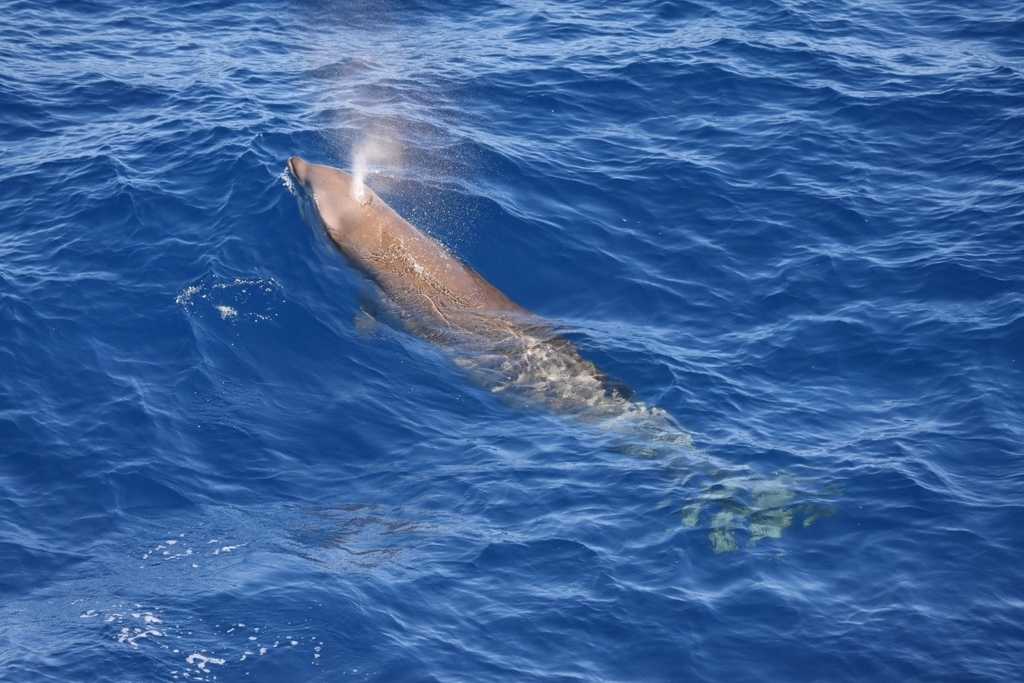
Cuvier's beaked whale

In 2003 Aguilar de Soto began a long-term research study observing Blainville's and Cuvier's beaked whales in the waters off El Hierro (Canary Islands). Researchers carried out seasonal monitoring of cetaceans using non-invasive DTAGs, developed at Woods Hole Oceanographic Institution (WHOI). The tags attach using suction cups which eventually fall off. They record sound and motion and transmit data back to researchers. The objective of this work was to better understand the behavior, social structure and population distribution of beaked whales.

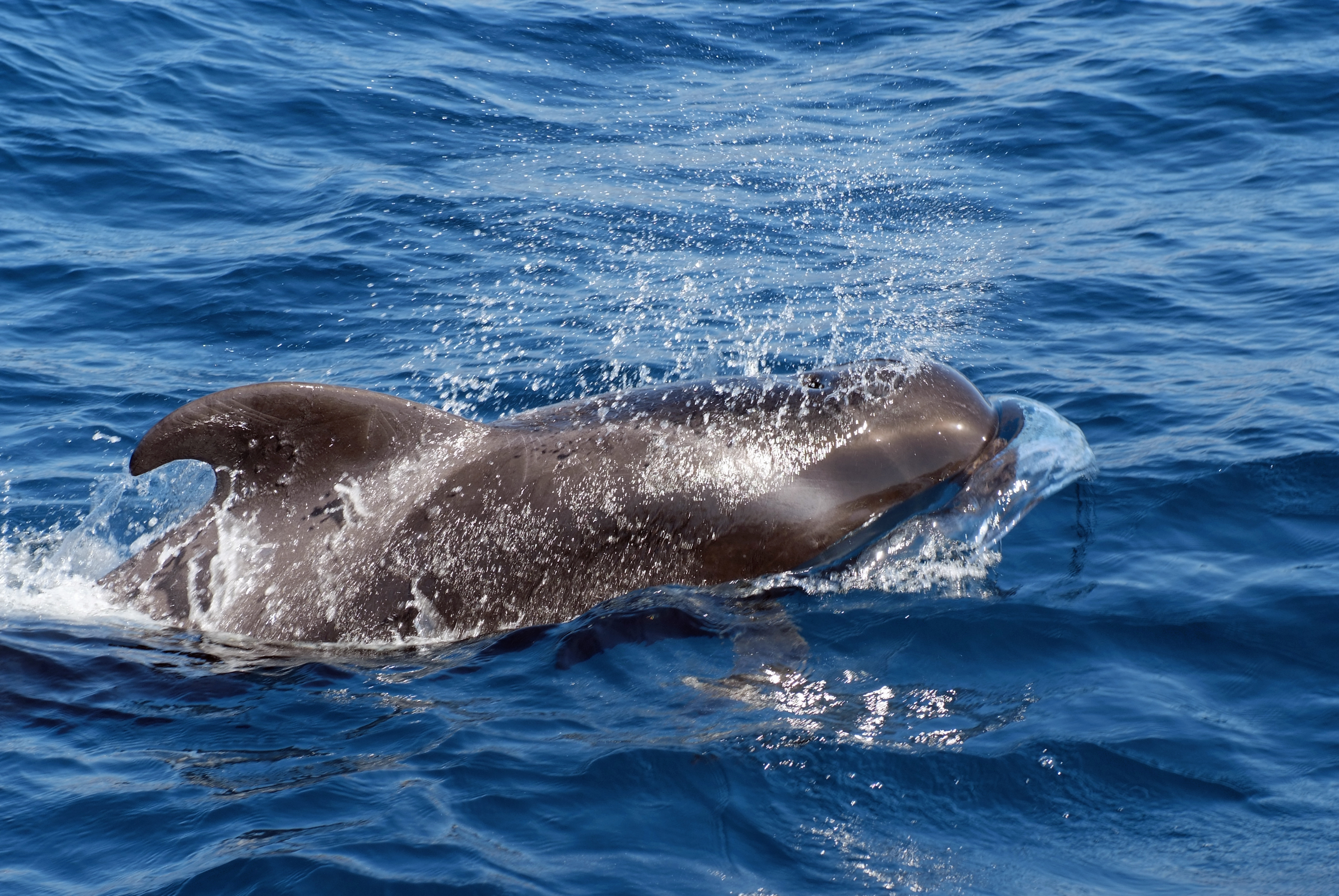
Short-finned Pilot Whale surfacing

Aguilar de Soto's Ph.D. thesis addressed Acoustic and diving behaviour of the short finned pilot whales (Globicephala macrorhynchus) and Blainville's beaked whale (Mesoplodon densirostris) off the Canary Islands. Implications on the effects of man-made noise and boat collisions (trans., 2006). The combination of recorded whale "clicks" and "buzzes" with speed, orientation, and depth data from the DTAGs revealed an unsuspected picture of how the whales hunt. Described in the Journal of Animal Ecology (2008), pilot whales make high-speed dives to pursue large deep-dwelling prey and then return to the surface to breathe and rest. The amount of energy involved in such sprints is far greater than a minimum cost. This research indicates that marine ecologists must address use of three-dimensional space, prey field distribution and the metabolism of energy expenditure as factors in models of marine foraging. Aguilar de Soto's research on these "cheetahs of the deep sea" is causing scientists to rethink their understanding of diving and feeding behaviors. It may influence policies for the management of whale-watching and shipping.

With the R.V. Cornide de Saavedra, Aguilar de Soto helped to evaluate the effects of a submarine volcanic eruption off El Hierro Island, occurring from 10 October 2011 to 5 March 2012.

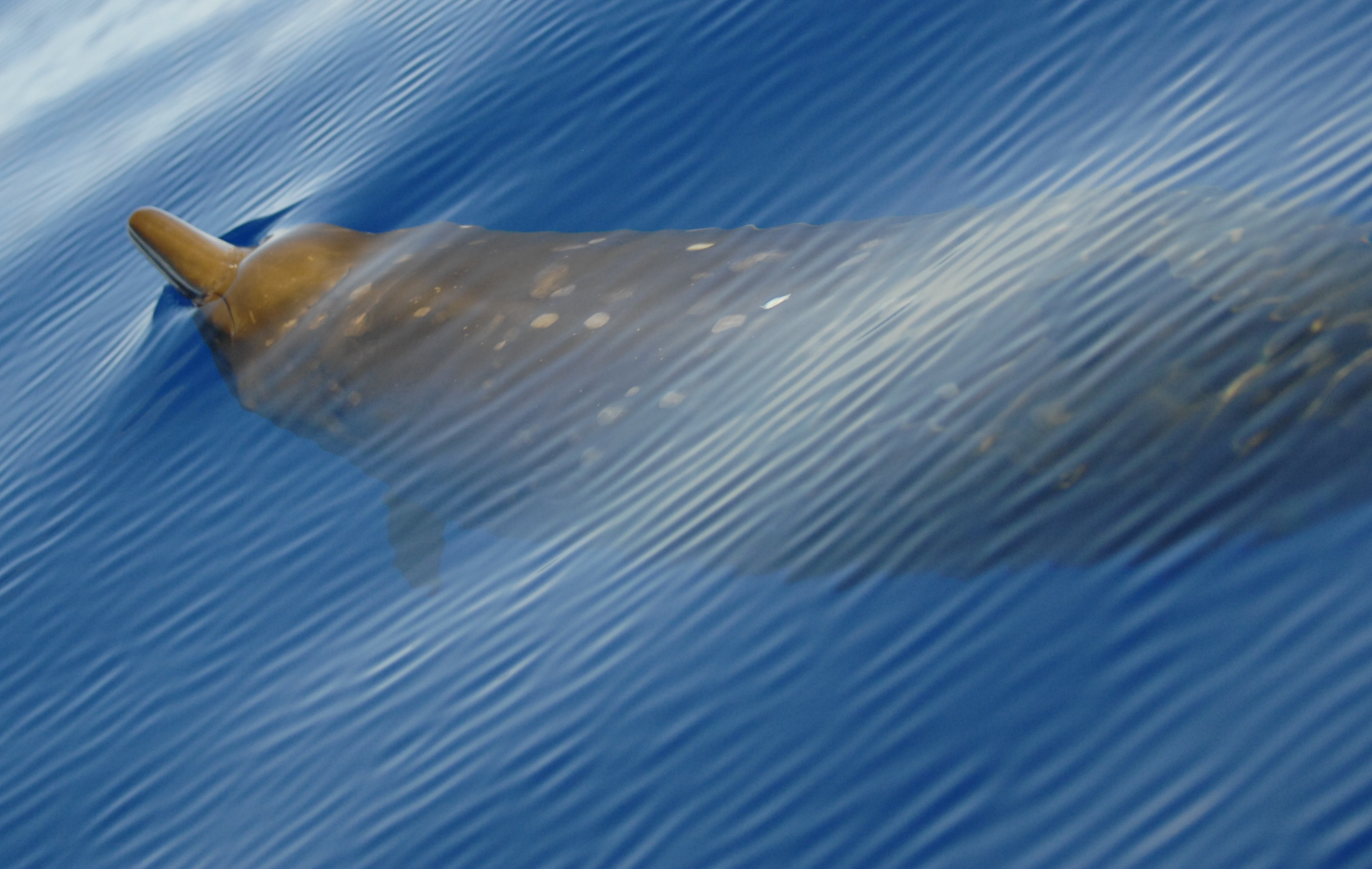
Blainville's beaked whale

Also in 2012, Aguilar de Soto co-authored an article in Marine Mammal Science discussing the acoustic camouflage of Blainville's beaked whales. Blainville's beaked whales avoid detection from killer whales by maintaining complete silence during ascents and at less than 170 metres (560 ft) below the surface. Vocalizations consistent with echolocation and communication occur only in the latter part of descents and the deepest phase of dives, in which social group members synchronize their movement.

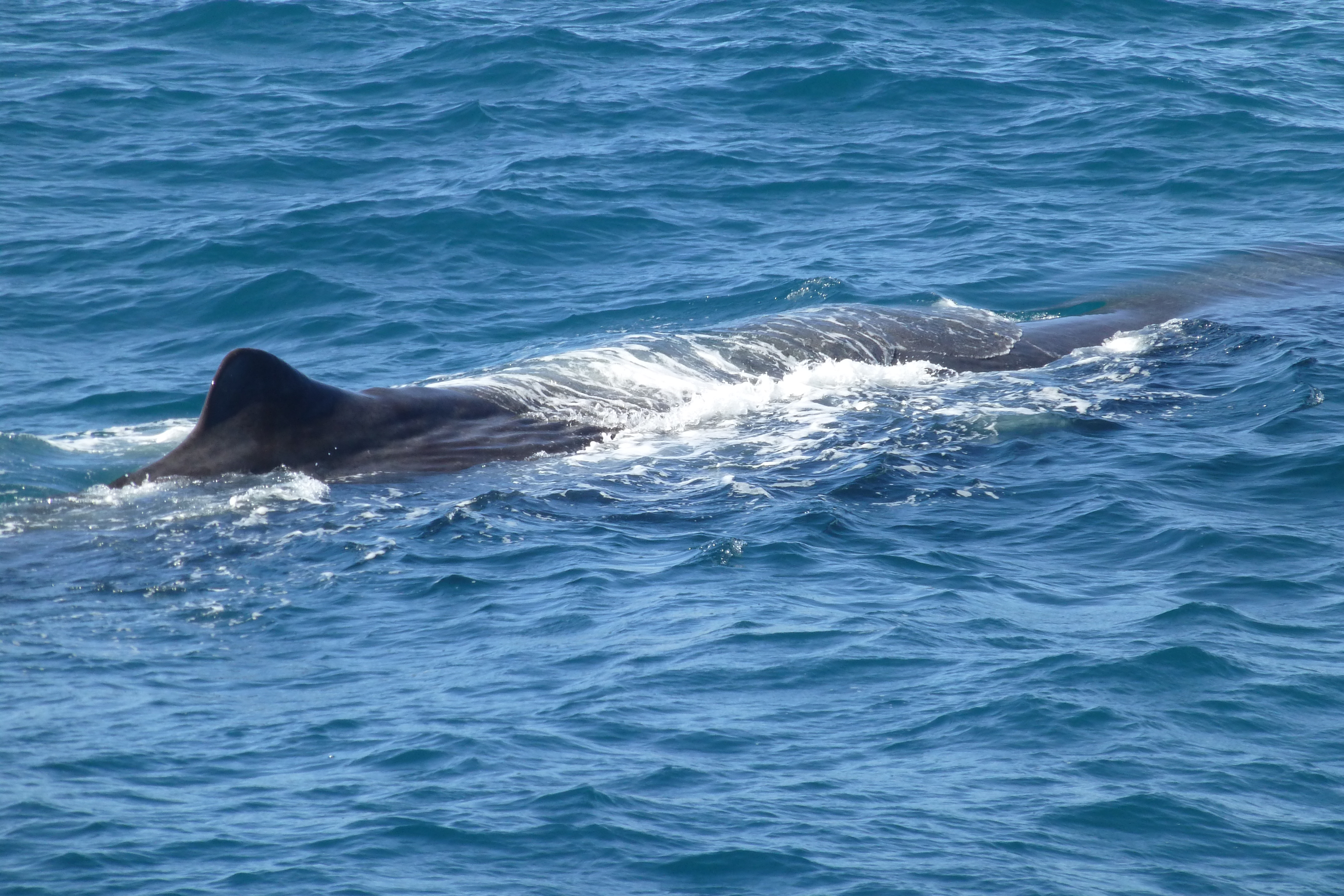
Sperm whale

With Andrea Fais and other researchers from multiple international centers, Aguilar de Soto carried out a complete acoustic sampling of sperm whales, in the deep waters off the Canary Islands. After covering an area of 52,933 square kilometres (20,438 sq mi) along 2,668 kilometres (1,658 mi) of acoustic line-transects, the scientists estimated that the current population of sperm whales in Canary waters was around 224 individuals. They compared that data with strandings involved in collisions with ships. Data from the CetAVist project between 2012 and 2015 indicated that the Canary Islands is one of the places in the world with the most records of stranding of cetaceans due to collision with ships. In addition, the study highlighted that the mortality of sperm whales due to collisions may exceed the natural growth capacity of the species in the archipelago, leading to a decline in population. As a result of this study, a number of steps were recommended to address this issue. Some recommendations have been implemented, such as the inclusion of relevant information in the training of ship captains who study at the ULL Nautical Engineering School.

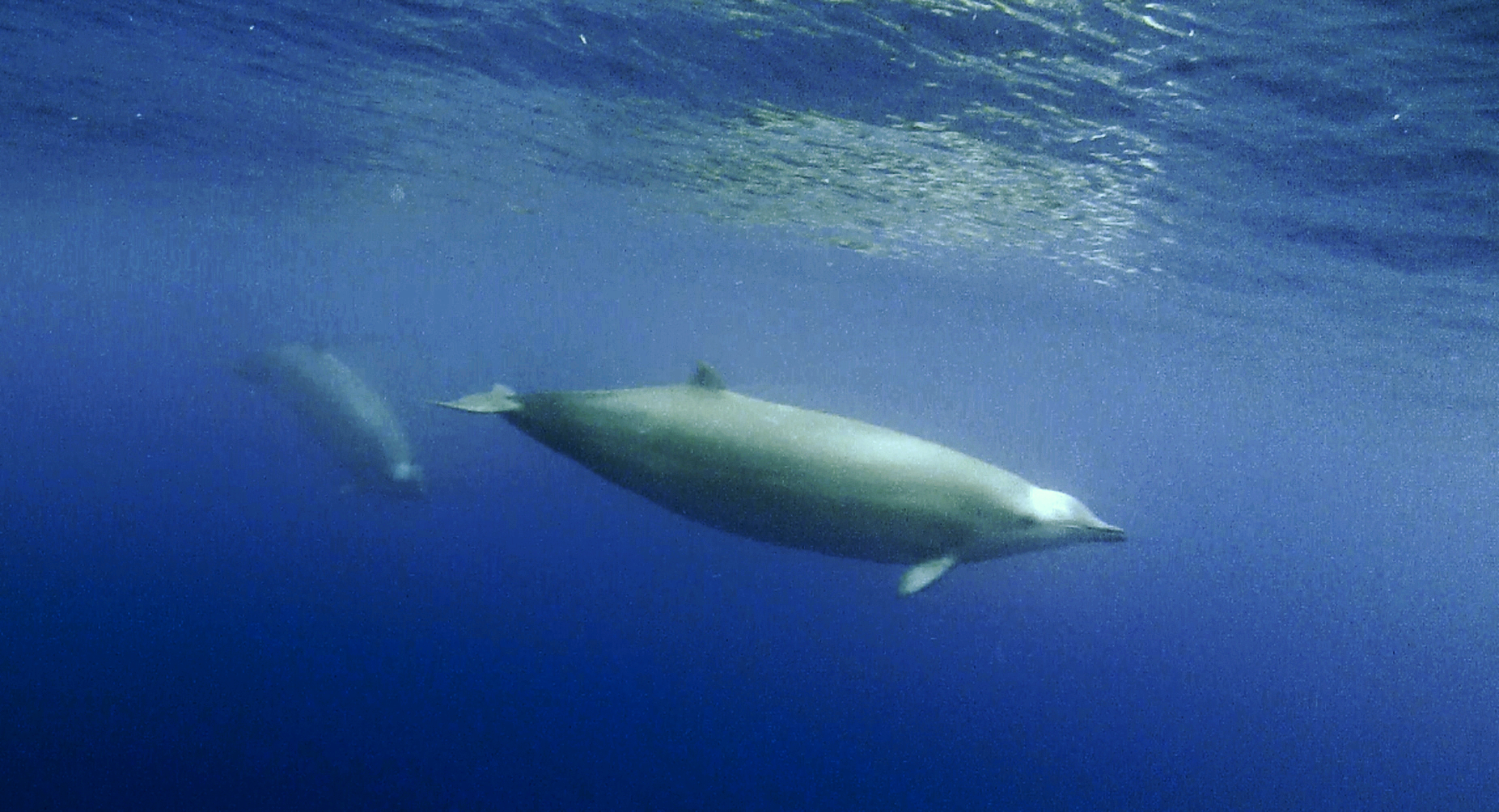
Frame from first underwater footage of True's beaked whales, PeerJ, 7 March 2017.

Underwater video of True's beaked whales recorded off the Azores by R Edler within the Master Mint program

In 2017, Aguilar de Soto coauthored a study on the family of beaked whales (Ziphiidae). It includes the first known underwater video recording of living True's beaked whales (Mesoplodon mirus), one of the least known and rarely seen beaked whales in the world. The recording was made off the coast of the Azores from a small inflatable boat as part of the Master Mind student program. The teacher and students did not recognize the species or realize that it was a historical first. The presence of True's beaked whales in the footage was later confirmed by Aguilar de Soto.

== Awards and honors ==
- 2018, Award for outstanding female researchers, Instituto Universitario de Estudios de las Mujeres (IUEM), University of La Laguna

== Selected publications ==
- Arranz, Patricia; de Soto, Natacha Aguilar; Madsen, Peter T.; Sprogis, Kate R. (1 December 2021). "Whale-watch vessel noise levels with applications to whale-watching guidelines and conservation". Marine Policy. 134 104776. doi:10.1016/j.marpol.2021.104776. ISSN 0308-597X. S2CID 239433014.
- Alcázar-Treviño, Jesús; Johnson, Mark; Arranz, Patricia; Warren, Victoria E.; Pérez-González, Carlos J.; Marques, Tiago; Madsen, Peter T.; Aguilar de Soto, Natacha (13 January 2021). "Deep-diving beaked whales dive together but forage apart". Proceedings of the Royal Society B: Biological Sciences. 288 (1942) 20201905. doi:10.1098/rspb.2020.1905. PMC 7892404. PMID 33402065.
- Aguilar de Soto, Natacha; Visser, Fleur; Tyack, Peter L.; Alcazar, Jesús; Ruxton, Graeme; Arranz, Patricia; Madsen, Peter T.; Johnson, Mark (6 February 2020). "Fear of Killer Whales Drives Extreme Synchrony in Deep Diving Beaked Whales". Scientific Reports. 10 (1): 13. Bibcode:2020NatSR..10...13A. doi:10.1038/s41598-019-55911-3. ISSN 2045-2322. PMC 7005263. PMID 32029750. S2CID 211047204.
- Bernaldo de Quirós, Y; Fernandez, A; Baird, RW; Brownell RL, Jr; Aguilar de Soto, N; Allen, D; Arbelo, M; Arregui, M; Costidis, A; Fahlman, A; Frantzis, A; Gulland, FMD; Iñíguez, M; Johnson, M; Komnenou, A; Koopman, H; Pabst, DA; Roe, WD; Sierra, E; Tejedor, M; Schorr, G (30 January 2019). "Advances in research on the impacts of anti-submarine sonar on beaked whales". Proceedings. Biological Sciences. 286 (1895) 20182533. doi:10.1098/rspb.2018.2533. PMC 6364578. PMID 30963955.
- Aguilar de Soto, Natacha; Martín, Vidal; Silva, Monica; Edler, Roland; Reyes, Cristel; Carrillo, Manuel; Schiavi, Agustina; Morales, Talia; García-Ovide, Belen; Sanchez-Mora, Anna; Garcia-Tavero, Nerea; Steiner, Lisa; Scheer, Michael; Gockel, Roland; Walker, Dylan; Villa, Enrico; Szlama, Petra; Eriksson, Ida K.; Tejedor, Marisa; Perez-Gil, Monica; Quaresma, João; Bachara, Wojtek; Carroll, Emma (7 March 2017). "True's beaked whale (Mesoplodon mirus) in Macaronesia". PeerJ. 5 e3059. doi:10.7717/peerj.3059. ISSN 2167-8359. PMC 5344021. PMID 28286714.
- Aguilar de Soto, Natacha; Gkikopoulou, Kalliopi; Hooker, Sascha; Isojunno, Saana; Johnson, Mark; Miller, Patrick; Tyack, Peter; Wensveen, Paul; Donovan, Carl; Harris, Catriona M.; Harris, Danielle; Marshall, Laura; Oedekoven, Cornelia; Prieto, Rocio; Thomas, Len (2016). "From physiology to policy: A review of physiological noise effects on marine fauna with implications for mitigation". Proceedings of Meetings on Acoustics: 040008. doi:10.1121/2.0000299.
- Aguilar de Soto, Natacha (1 January 2013). "Echolocation in Blainville's beaked whales (Mesoplodon densirostris)". Journal of Comparative Physiology A.
- Aguilar de Soto, Natacha; Madsen, Peter T.; Tyack, Peter; Arranz, Patricia; Marrero, Jacobo; Fais, Andrea; Revelli, Eletta; Johnson, Mark (April 2012). "No shallow talk: Cryptic strategy in the vocal communication of Blainville's beaked whales". Marine Mammal Science. 28 (2): E75–E92. doi:10.1111/j.1748-7692.2011.00495.x.
- Aguilar de Soto, N.; Johnson, M.P.; Madsen, P.T.; Díaz, F.; Domínguez, I.; Brito, A.; Tyack, P. (2008). "Cheetahs of the deep sea: deep foraging sprints in short finned pilot whales off Tenerife (Canary Islands)". Journal of Animal Ecology. 77 (5): 936–947. doi:10.1111/j.1365-2656.2008.01393.x. hdl:10261/346363. PMID 18444999.
- Aguilar de Soto, N. (2006). Comportamiento Acústico y de Buceo del Calderón Globicephala macrorhynchus y del Zifio de Blainville Mesoplodon Densirostris en las Islas Canarias. Implicaciones Sobre los Efectos del Ruido Antrópico y Las Colisiones con Embarcaciones. Ph.D. thesis. San Cristóbal de La Laguna: Universidad de La Laguna.
