= Mark Olssen =

New Zealand philosopher

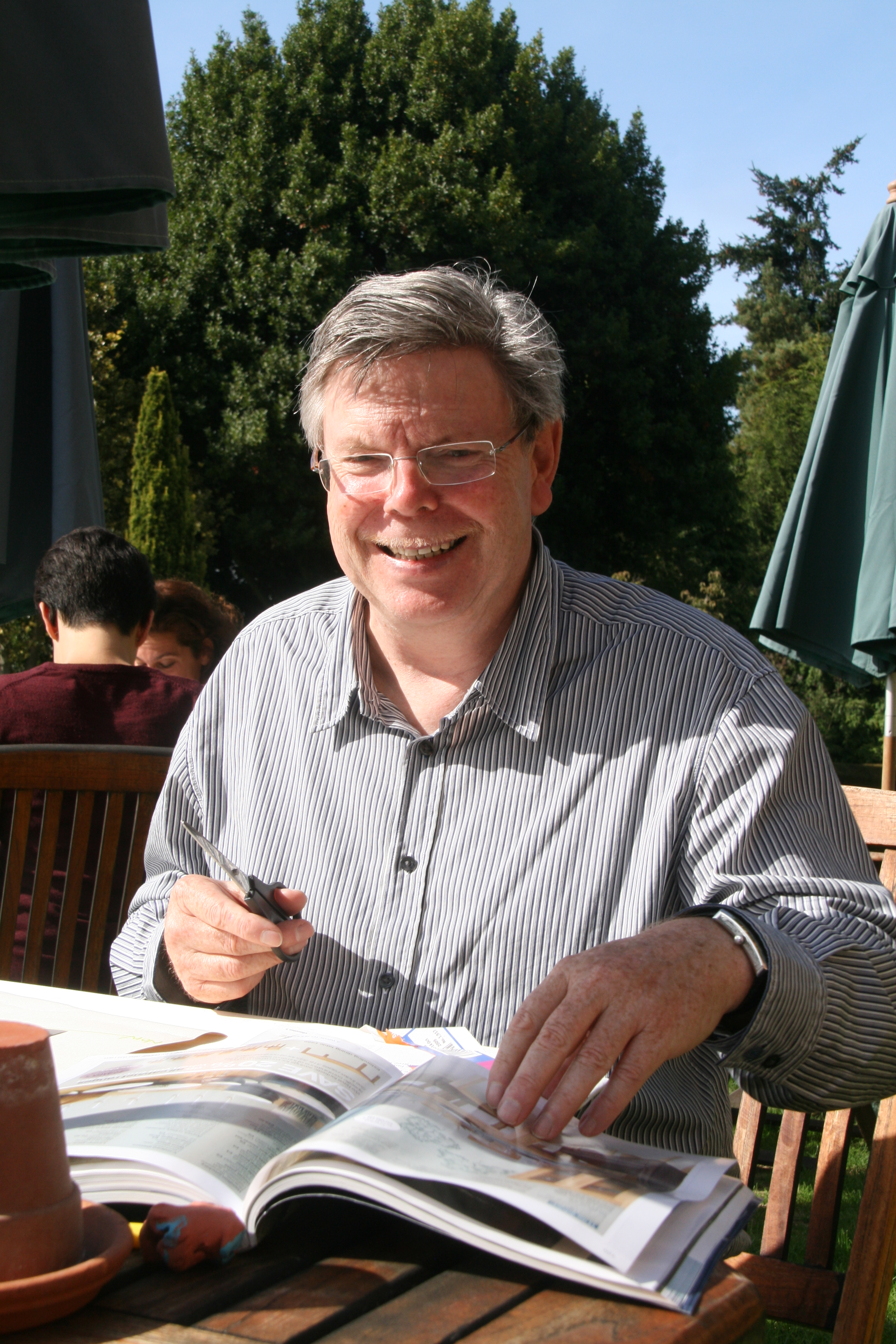

Mark Olssen FRSA FAcSS FBA, a political theorist, is emeritus Professor of Political Theory and Education Policy in the Department of Politics within the Faculty of Social Sciences at the University of Surrey.

== Biography ==
Born and educated in Dunedin, New Zealand, Olssen completed a PhD at the University of Otago in 1983, with a thesis on New Zealand trade unions.

Olssen moved to England in 2001, and has researched and taught at the University of Surrey since that date. He researches include works on Foucault, education policy, social and political theory and quantum and post-quantum complexity approaches in the social sciences and he relates theoretical issues to contemporary matters of social and political concern, including neoliberalism, social theory, ethics, and higher education policy. Utilising a critical and constructivist approach across his individual books and articles, a nagging long-term interest is to develop a new non-foundationalist normative political ethics, inspired by Foucault and others, which can orientate politics, education and ethics in a global age.

Notable doctoral students of Olssen's include Judith Duncan, professor of early childhood education at the University of Canterbury.

== Books ==
- Olssen, M. The Return of the Good in the Age of AI: Relational Selfhood, Digital Commons and Planetary Ethics. Cheltenham, UK: Edward Elgar. 2026.
- Olssen, M. A Normative Foucauldian: Collected Papers of Mark Olssen. Introduction by Stephen J. Ball. Boston, Mass.: Brill | Sense Publishers, forthcoming 2021.
- Olssen, M. Constructing Foucault's Ethics: A Poststructuralist Moral Theory for the 21st Century. Manchester: Manchester University Press, 2021.
- Olssen, M., Liberalism, Neoliberalism, Social Democracy: Thin Communitarian Perspectives on Political Philosophy and Education., New York: Routledge, 2010
- Olssen, M., Toward a Global Thin Community: Nietzsche, Foucault and the cosmopolitan commitment, Paradigm Press, Boulder, Colorado, USA, October 2009 (See Review)
- Olssen, M., Codd, J. and O'Neill, A-M, Education Policy: Globalisation, Citizenship, Democracy, London: Sage, 2004
- Olssen, M Michel Foucault: Materialism and Education. Boulder, Colorado and London: Paradigm Publishers, 2006.

== Recent articles ==
- Olssen, Mark (2021). 'The Rehabilitation of the Concept of Public Good: Reappraising the Attacks from Liberalism and Neo-Liberalism from a Poststructuralist Perspective,' Review of Contemporary Philosophy 20, pp. 7–52.
- Olssen, Mark, and Will Mace (2021). 'British Idealism, Complexity Theory and Society: The Political Usefulness of T. H. Green in a Revised Conception of Social Democracy,' Linguistic and Philosophical Investigations 20: 7–34.
- Olssen, Mark (2020) 'Neoliberalism and Laissez-Faire: The retreat from naturalism', in Joseph Zajda (ed.), Globalisation, Comparative Education and Policy Research, pp. 121 - 140. Dordrecht: Springer Nature. (republished from Solsko Polje).
- Olssen, Mark (2019) 'Foucault and Neoliberalism: A response to critics and a new resolution', Materiali Foucaultiani, vol. V, nos. 12 – 13, pp. 28 – 55.
- Olssen, Mark (2018) 'Neoliberalism and Laissez-Faire: The retreat from naturalism', Solsko Polje, vol. XXIX, nos. 1 – 2, pp. 33 – 56. (Special Issue: The Language of Neoliberal Education).
- Richard Watermeyer and Mark Olssen (2019), 'The dissipating value of public service in UK Higher Education', in Lindgreen, A., Koenig-Lewis, N., Kitchener, M., Brewer, J. D., Moore, M.H., and Meynhardt, T. (eds) Public Value: Deepening, Enriching and Broadening the Theory and Practice, Abingdon: Routledge.
- Olssen, Mark (2018) 'Neoliberalism & Democracy: A Foucauldian Perspective on Public Choice Theory, Ordoliberalism and the Concept of the Public Good', in Damien Cahill, Melinda Cooper, Martijn Konings and David Primrose, eds. The Sage Handbook of Neoliberalism. London: Sage Publications, pp. 384 – 396.
- Olssen, Mark (2017) 'Complexity & Learning: Implications for Teacher Education', in Michael A. Peters, Bromwyn Cowie and Ian Mentor (eds.) A Companion to Research in Teacher Education. Singapore: Springer Nature, pp. 507 – 520.
- Rille Raaper and Mark Olssen (2017) 'In Conversation with Mark Olssen: on Foucault with Hegel and Marx', Open Review of Educational Research, Vol. 4 (1), pp. 96 – 117.
- Olssen, Mark (2017) 'Neoliberalism and Beyond: The possibilities of a social justice agenda', in Stephen Parker, Kalervo N. Gulson and Trevor Gale (eds.), Policy and Inequality in Education. Singapore: Springer Nature, pp. 41 – 72.
- Olssen, Mark (2017) 'Wittgenstein and Foucault: The limits and Possibilities of Constructivism', in Michael A. Peters and Jeff Stickney (eds.), A Companion to Wittgenstein on Education. Singapore: Springer Nature, pp. 305 – 320.
- Richard Watermeyer and Olssen, Mark (2016, May), 'Excellence and Exclusion: the individual costs of institutional competitiveness', Minerva, 54, pp. 201 –218, DOI: 10.1007/s1 1024 - 016- 9298 - 5.
- Raaper, Rille, and Mark Olssen (2016, February), 'Mark Olssen on the neoliberalisation of higher education and academic lives: an interview,' Policy Futures in Education, 14(2), pp. 147 –163. Available on-line first from 2/11/15, doi: 10.1177/1478210315610992 (Sage Publications, London).
- Olssen, Mark, (2016, January) 'Neoliberalism and Higher Education Today: research, accountability and impact'. British Journal of the Sociology of Education, Vol. 37, (1), pp. 129 – 148.
- Olssen, Mark (2015) 'Ascertaining the Normative Implications of Complexity for Politics: Beyond Agent-Based Modeling', in Emilian Kavalski (ed.) World Politics at the Edge of Chaos: Reflections on Complexity and Global Life ( David C. Earnest, editor and James N. Rosenau series editor in Global Politics series). SUNY Press, New York, pp. 139 – 168.
- Olssen, Mark and Michael Peters (June 2015), 'Marx, Education and the Possibilities of a Fairer World: Reviving Radical Political Economy through Foucault', Linguistic and Philosophical Investigations, 14, pp. 39 – 69, (Addleton Academic Publishers, New York).
- Olssen, Mark (January 2015) 'Social Democracy, Complexity and Education: Sociological Perspectives from Welfare Liberalism.' Knowledge Cultures, Vol. 2, No. 6, pp. 115 – 129 (Addelton Academic Publishers, New York).
- Olssen, Mark (January 2015) 'Discourse, Complexity, Normativity: Tracing the elaboration of Foucault's materialist concept of discourse', Open Review of Educational Research, Vol. 1, No. 1, pp. 28–55 (Taylor/Francis, London).
- Olssen, Mark (2017) 'Exploring Complexity through Literature: Reframing Foucault's research project with hindsight', Linguistic and Philosophical Investigations, 16, pp. 80 – 89. (Addleton Academic Publishers, New York).
