= Patrick O'Byrne (pianist) =

New Zealand pianist

Patrick O'Byrne (born 1955 in Dublin) is an Irish-born New Zealand pianist.

== Life ==
O'Byrne was born in Dublin and raised in New Zealand. He studied piano at the University of Auckland with Janetta McStay, then in Europe as a scholar of the Queen Elizabeth II Arts Council of New Zealand and the DAAD. His teachers included Kendall Taylor and Vlado Perlemuter. He completed his studies at the Hochschule für Musik Freiburg with Rosa Sabater, won first prize in the José Iturbi International Piano Competition in 1983 and settled in Germany. In 1985 was appointed Professor at the State University of Music and Performing Arts Stuttgart where he was later Vice Chancellor. Since April 2002 has been a professor at the University of the Arts Bremen.

He has given concert appearances in world centres, and worked as a soloist with the New Zealand Symphony Orchestra, RTÉ Symphony, Bochumer Sinfonikern, New York Virtuosi, etc. under Charles Groves, Franz-Paul Decker, Kenneth Klein, Albert Rosen and many others. He has given masterclasses in the US, South America, Asia and Europe and adjudicated at international competitions. He has made recordings for television, radio and on CD, and his repertoire embraces all styles.
