= Judith Duncan =

Judith Duncan may refer to:

- Judith Duncan (novelist)
- Judith Duncan (academic)
