= Ramari Stewart =

New Zealand Māori expert on whales

Ramari Stewart MNZM
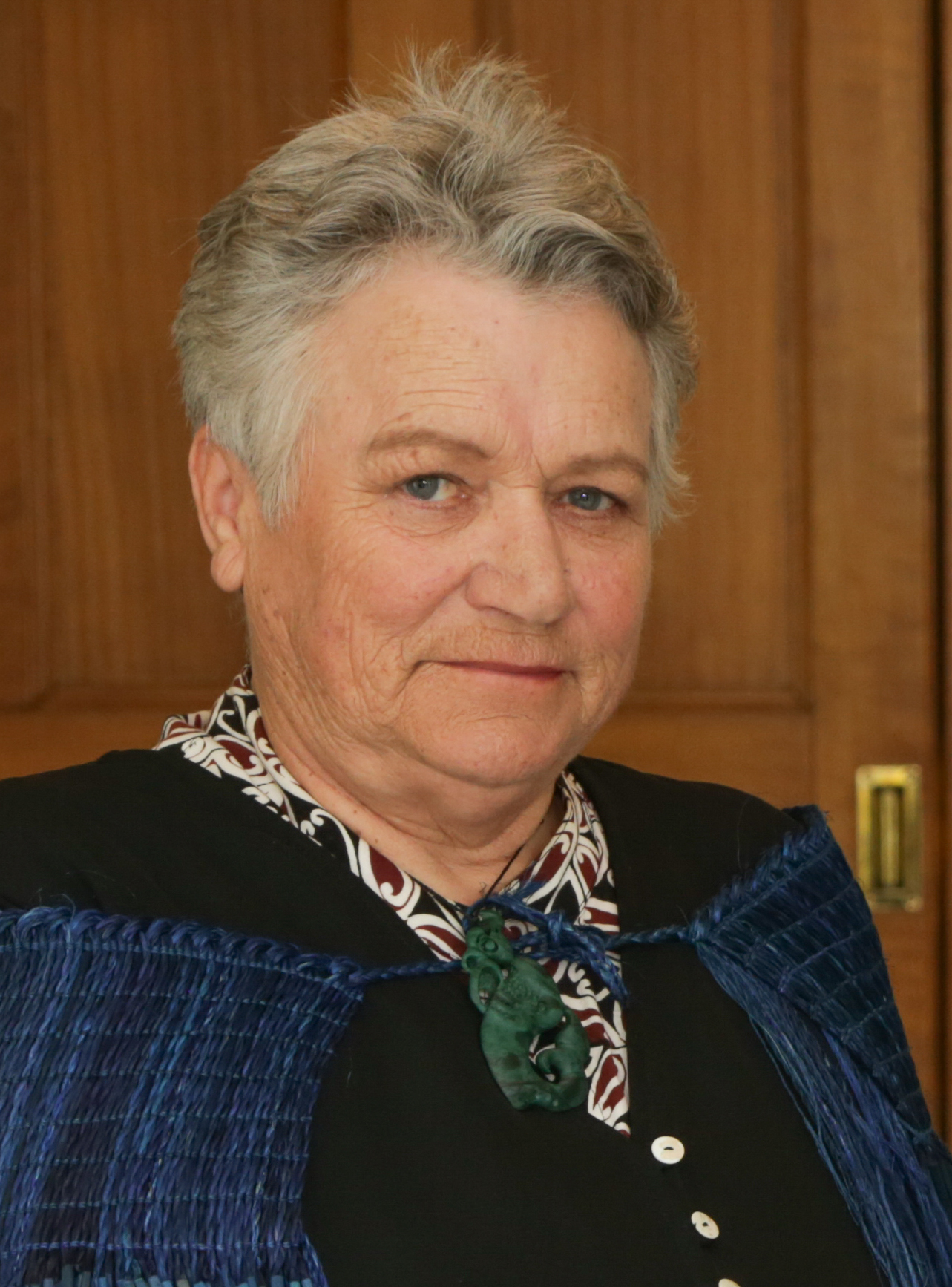
- Stewart in 2020
- Born: Ramari Evelyn Sidonie Oliphant Stewart
- Scientific career
- Fields: Cetology

Ramari Evelyn Sidonie Oliphant Stewart MNZM is a New Zealand Māori whale expert. Her iwi affiliations are Ngāti Awa, Rongomaiwahine, and Ngāti Mahuta. She was appointed a Member of the New Zealand Order of Merit in the 2020 Queen's Birthday Honours, for services Māori culture and wildlife conservation and research. The newly discovered Ramari's beaked whale is named in her honour. Stewart had assisted in the recovery and preparation of this pregnant female, thought at the time to be a True's beaked whale in 2012.

== Life and career ==
Stewart was raised in Port Ohope in the Bay of Plenty and tutored from an early age in mātauranga Māori, the traditional knowledge of the natural world. Her connection to whales began in childhood; at the age of ten she was recognised as a whale rider, a person who has a special kinship with whales. As a young woman she went to the Cook Islands in search of migrating humpback whales. In the 1970s, she was based on Moutohora Island for three years studying the local dolphin population, one of the first longterm studies of its kind conducted in New Zealand. In 1983, she travelled to the subantarctic Campbell Island as a technician, cook, and medic for the Meteorological Service after learning southern right whales overwintered there. The paid work kept her from focusing solely on the whales, so she returned for three field seasons in the mid 1990s (1994, 1995, and 1997) to study the local whale population.

Stewart specialises in the traditional recovery and use of stranded whales for both customary use and research. In 2014 she was involved in the customary recovery of a pod of nine orca at Te Waewae Bay, the second largest recorded stranding. The newly discovered whale species Mesoplodon eueu (Ramari's beaked whale) is named in her honour; in 2012 Stewart had assisted in the recovery and preparation of this pregnant female, thought at the time to be a True's beaked whale.
