= William Sewell (poet) =

New Zealand poet (1951–2003)

- Born: 1 December 1951; Athens, Greece
- Died: 29 January 2003 (aged 51); Wellington, New Zealand
- Education: University of Auckland, University of Otago, Victoria University of Wellington
- Writing career
- Genre: Poetry
- Notable awards: Robert Burns Fellowship

William Seymour (Bill) Sewell (1 December 1951 – 29 January 2003) was a New Zealand poet. He was a Burns Fellow at Otago University, Dunedin in 1981–82. He was a frequent reviewer of books, particularly for the periodical New Zealand Books, to which he was appointed co-editor in 1997. He was also a book editor. He died of cancer in Wellington.

He published three collections of poems: Solo Flight (1982), Wheels within Wheels (1983) and Making the Far Land Glow (1986) and also A Guide to the Rimutaka Forest Park (1989). His poems have a link to modern German poetry and a political focus e.g. The Ballad of Fifty-one, about the 1951 waterfront dispute and Erebus: A Poem, about the 1979 Erebus disaster.

He was born in Athens in 1951 where his parents Rosemary Seymour and William Arthur Sewell were living at the time. His father was a former professor of English at the University of Auckland and later both his parents taught at the University of Waikato.

He lived in Southern Europe and then England where he attended school. He studied German at the University of Auckland and lectured in German at the University of Otago. He completed a PhD on the poetry of Hans Magnus Enzensberger at the University of Otago in 1978. He had a law degree from the Victoria University of Wellington and was a legal researcher for the Law Commission.

== Works ==
- Solo Flight (1982)
- Wheels within Wheels (1983)
- Making the Far Land Glow (1986)
- A Guide to the Rimutaka Forest Park (1989)
- Erebus: A Poem (1999)
- The Ballad of Fifty-One (2003)
