= Rosemary Seymour =

New Zealand feminist academic

Rosemary Yolande Levinge Seymour (16 June 1919 – 30 August 1984) was a New Zealand feminist academic. She was instrumental in establishing New Zealand's first women's studies course at the University of Waikato in 1974, the Women's Studies Journal, and the Women's Studies Association of New Zealand.

== Early life and education ==
The youngest of four children, Seymour was born on 16 June 1919 at Kohata Station, Whangara, north of Gisborne. She attended Woodford House School in Havelock North.

She gained a Bachelor of Arts degree in English literature in 1938 and a Master of Arts degree in English in 1943 from Auckland University College.While still a student at the university, she had an affair with her English professor, Arthur Sewell, who was married and 16 years her senior.

== Career and further education ==
After graduating, Seymour taught at her old secondary school, Woodford House, for a short period. She was appointed as a junior assistant lecturer at Auckland University College in 1942. In 1945, Arthur Sewell resigned from his position at the university and moved with Seymour to London. There, Seymour enrolled at Queen Mary College, University of London, for a postgraduate degree in English literature, but she did not complete it, citing "personal reasons". She and Sewell moved to Athens in 1947. Over a period of 18 years, they lived and worked in Greece, Spain, Turkey and Lebanon. She taught and presented occasional lectures for the British Council in Beirut, where the couple formed part of the local expatriate community whose number at the time included British intelligence officer Kim Philby.

Sewell and Seymour married in London in 1951. They had one child, William Seymour Sewell, who became a poet. The couple returned permanently to New Zealand in 1965 where Arthur Sewell was appointed visiting professor of English, and later foundation professor of English, at the University of Waikato.

Seymour's interests shifted from English literature, and in 1973 she graduated Master of Social Sciences with first-class honours from the University of Waikato. Her master's thesis explored women's roles in a variety of world religions. She was awarded a DPhil in 1981 for her doctoral thesis entitled Women at stake: ideological cross-currents in misogyny and philogyny

Her interest in feminist topics led to her active participation in the development of a women's studies course promoting feminist scholarship and activism at the University of Waikato. She founded the New Zealand Women’s Studies Journal, initiated a newsletter and in 1978 formed a network of women that became the Women's Studies Association (NZ) (WSANZ). She was a founding member of a number of feminist organisations including the Waikato branch of the Society for Research on Women, and helped to establish branches of the Women's National Abortion Action Committee and the Women's Electoral Lobby.

By 1980, Seymour's collection of articles, papers and books on women's studies had grown significantly. She secured funds to engage a Fulbright scholar, Jenrose Fehnley (or Fernley) who worked for six months to catalogue the material. The Rosemary Seymour Collection of 220 boxes of her papers is focused on women's studies interpreted in its widest sense. It has been held by the University of Waikato since 1985.

Seymour died of cancer on 30 August 1984.

== Legacy ==
The Rosemary Seymour Research and Archives Award was set up by the 1984 conference of the Women's Studies Association in recognition of Seymour's contribution. Recipients include Isobel Munro and Judith Duncan.

== Selected publications ==
- Women's studies in New Zealand, 1974-1977: a pilot bibliography-directory. Hamilton: Dept. of Sociology University of Waikato. 1978
- 'Learning Ourselves - An Overview of Programs and Directions', Journal of Educational Thought, v17 n2 p145-61. Aug 1983
- The man from Mars: and other poems. London: Outposts. 1964
