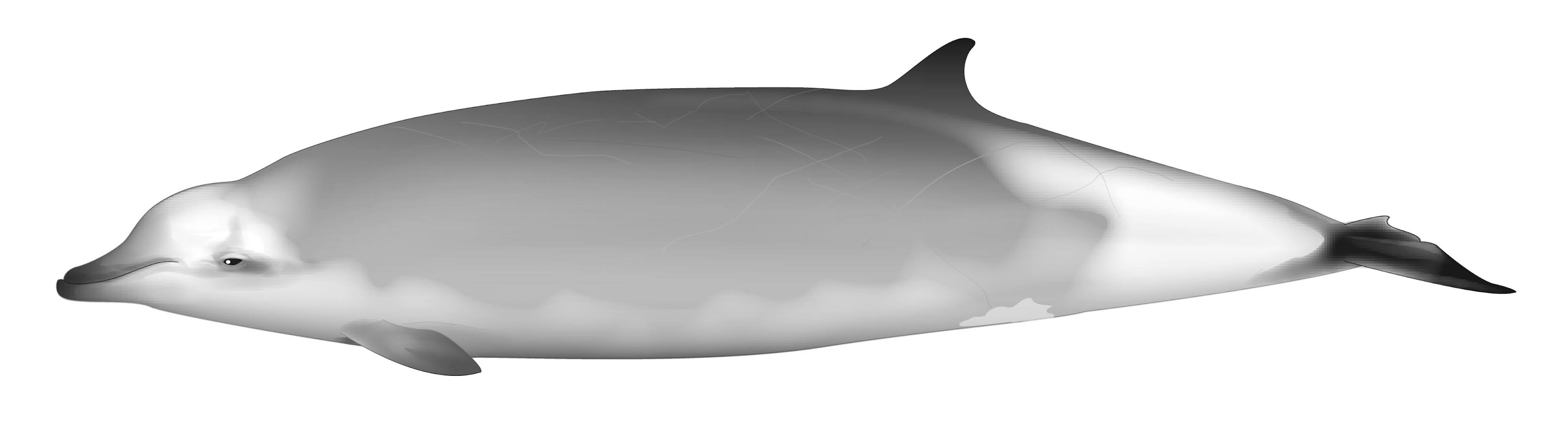

Conservation status
- Data Deficient (IUCN 3.1)
- CITES Appendix II

Scientific classification
- Kingdom: Animalia
- Phylum: Chordata
- Class: Mammalia
- Infraclass: Placentalia
- Order: Artiodactyla
- Infraorder: Cetacea
- Family: Ziphiidae
- Genus: Mesoplodon
- Species: M. eueu

Binomial name
- Mesoplodon eueu Carroll et al, 2021
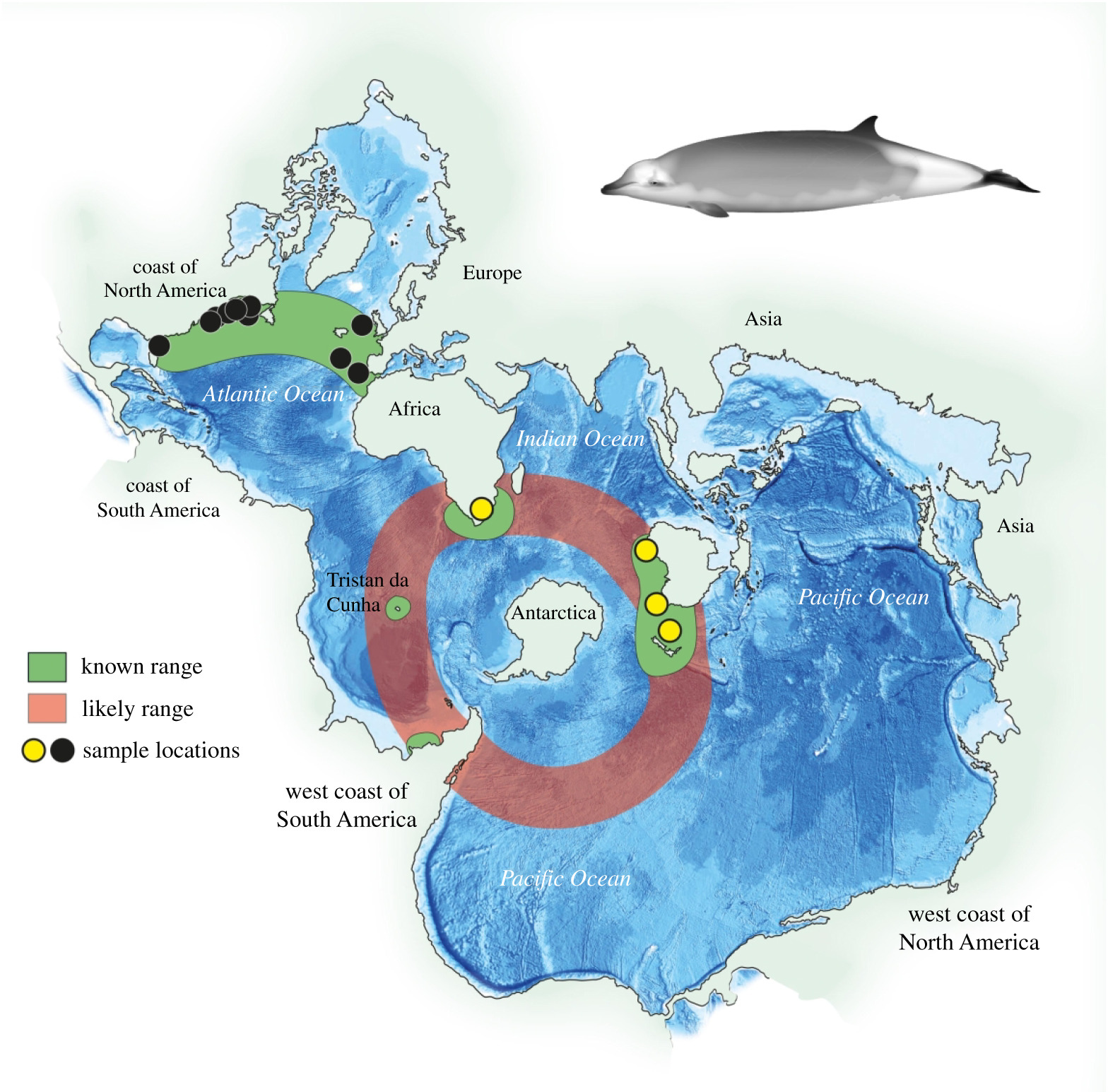
- Sampling locations in the NA (black circles; True's beaked whale) and SH (yellow circle; Ramari's beaked whale)

= Ramari's beaked whale =

Species of medium-size New Zealand whale

Ramari's beaked whale (Mesoplodon eueu) is a medium size whale in the genus Mesoplodon. It is found in cool waters of the Southern Hemisphere. The species name, eueu, comes from the Khwedam word meaning 'big fish', as most of the strandings of these whales come from Khoisan territories in South Africa. The common name honours Māori whale expert Ramari Stewart.

It was previously thought to represent an Indian Ocean population of True's beaked whale (M. mirus), although there was speculation that it could be a distinct subspecies of True's beaked whale. However, studies of the Indian Ocean beaked whales found them to be genetically distinct from True's beaked whale, having diverged in the early Pleistocene, and also found them to have a much wider range throughout the Southern Hemisphere. They were thus described as a distinct species, M. eueu.

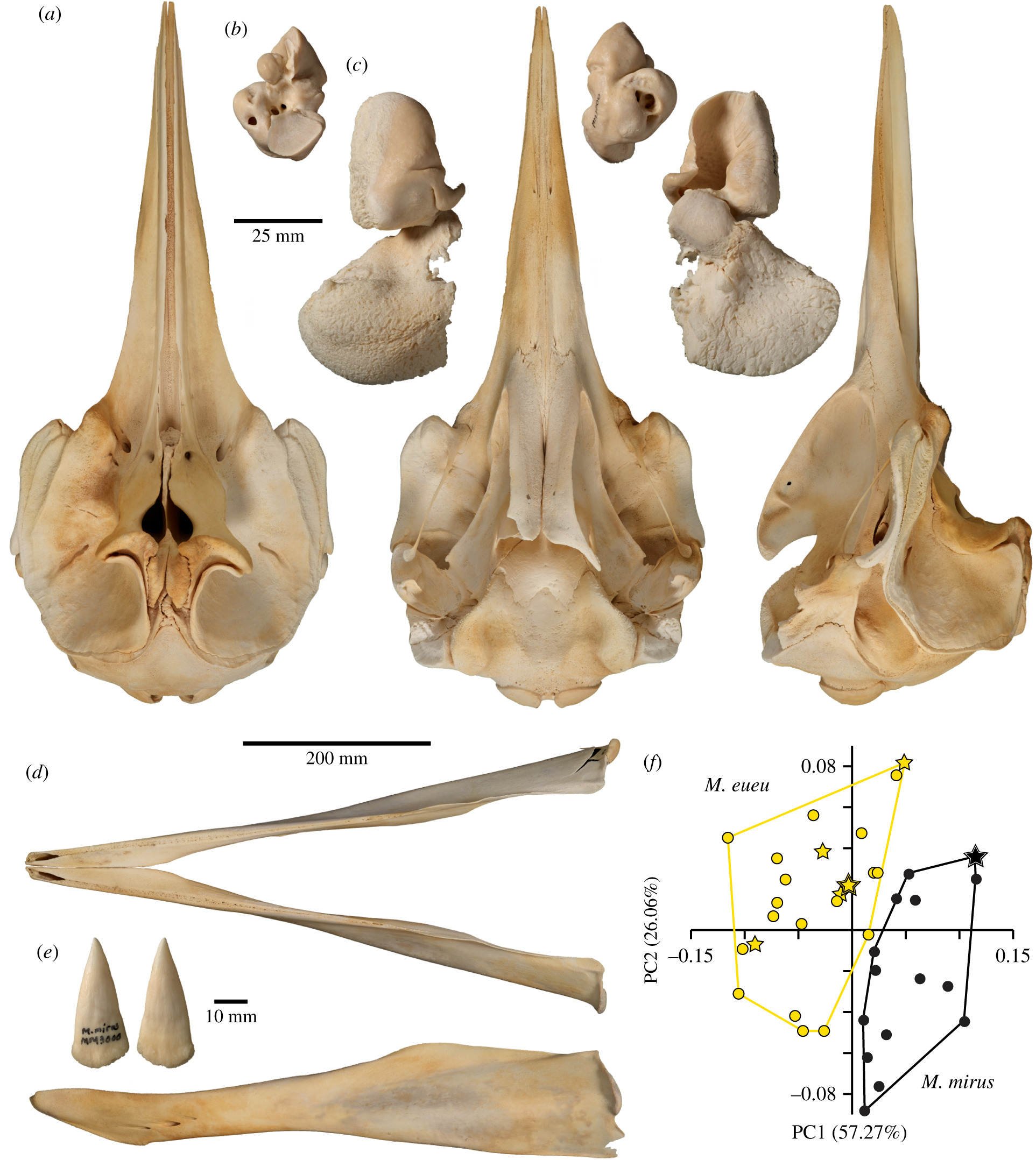
Skull and teeth of Ramari's beaked whale.

== Description ==
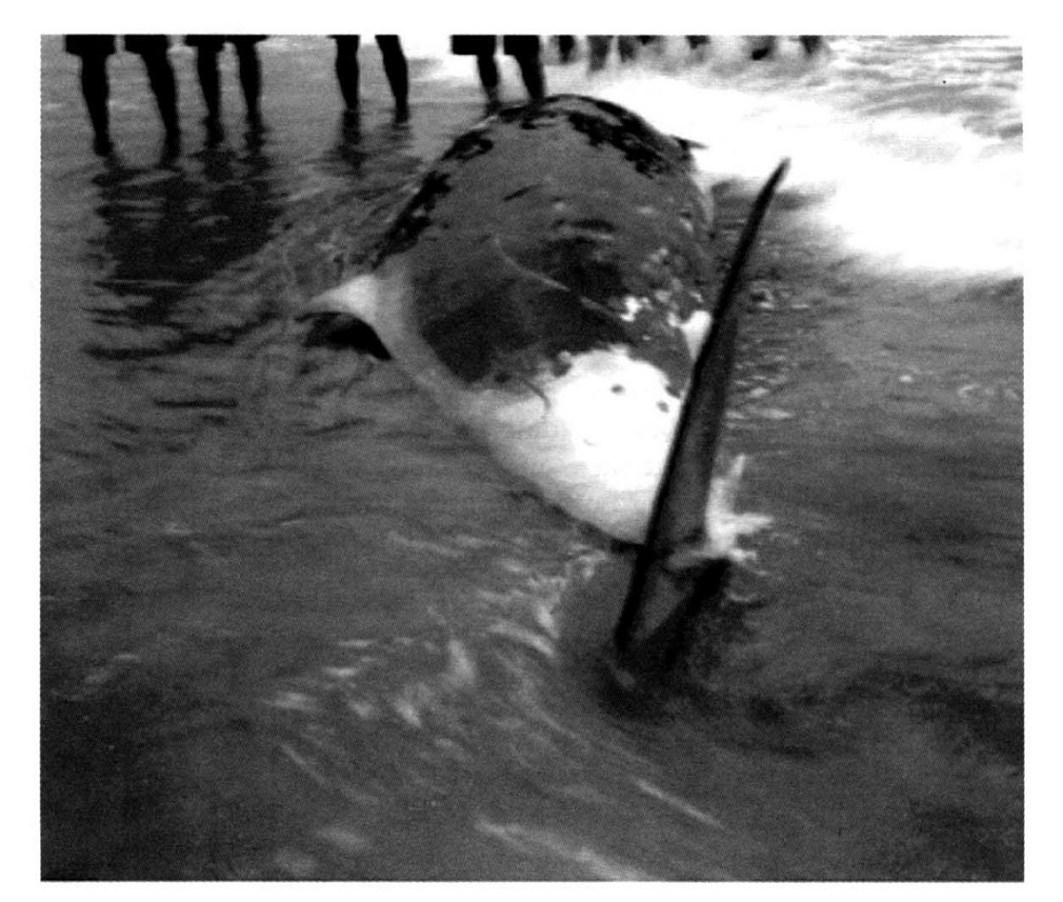
Freshly stranded adult male in Brazil (2004), showing the characteristic whitish tailstock.

The holotype is a 5-metre-long (16 ft) pregnant female who washed ashore in 2011 on Waiatoto Spit, south of Haast, New Zealand. She was named Nihongore by Te Rūnanga o Makaawhio. She was initially thought to be a True's beaked whale but further research has confirmed she is genetically and morphologically distinct from the Northern Hemisphere whales. The complete skeleton of her and her foetus are held in the Museum of New Zealand Te Papa Tongarewa in Wellington, and a tissue sample is in the New Zealand Cetacean Tissue Archive in Auckland. The paratype specimens of five individuals are held in Port Elizabeth Museum and Iziko South African Museum.

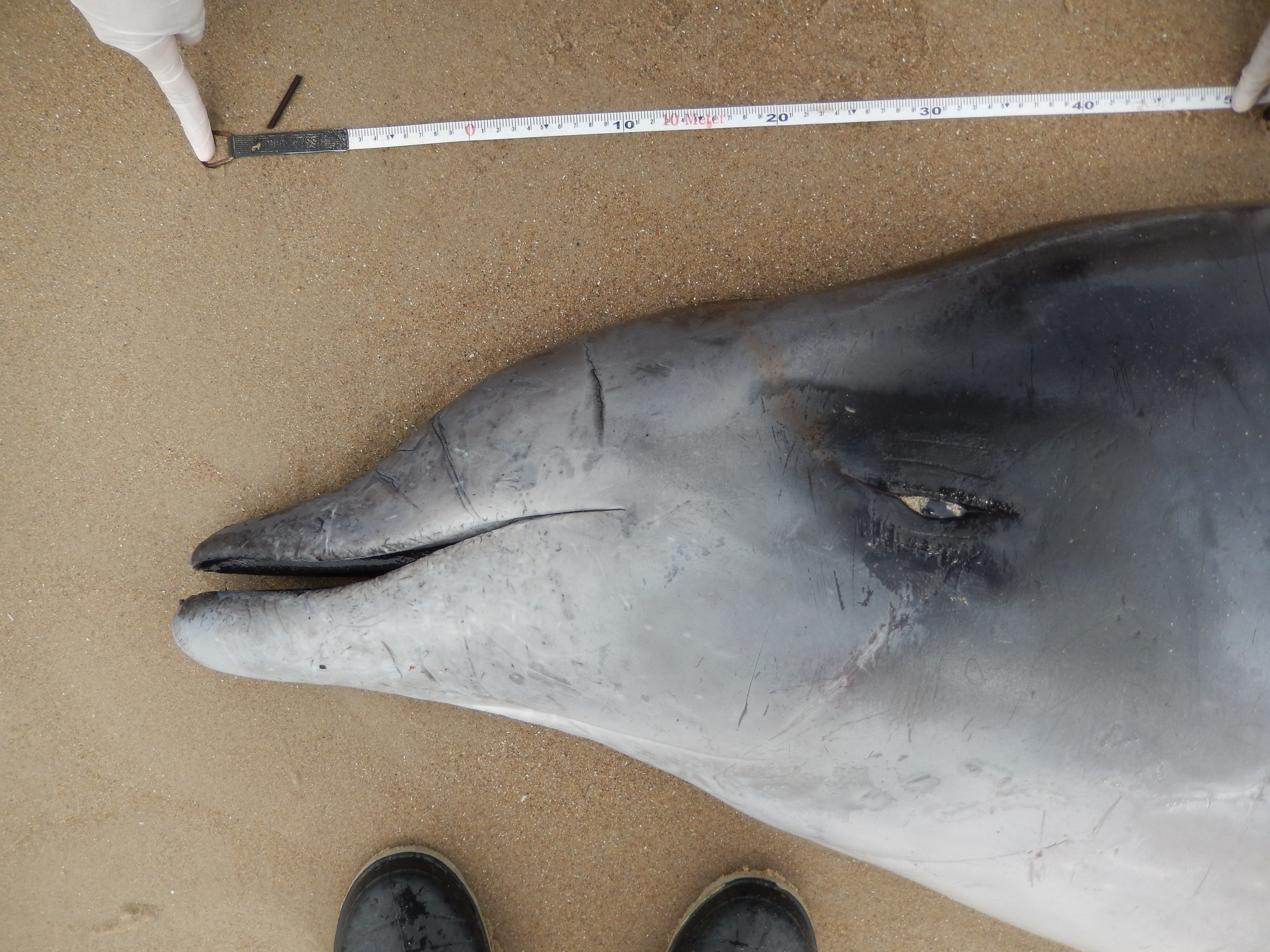
Adult head.

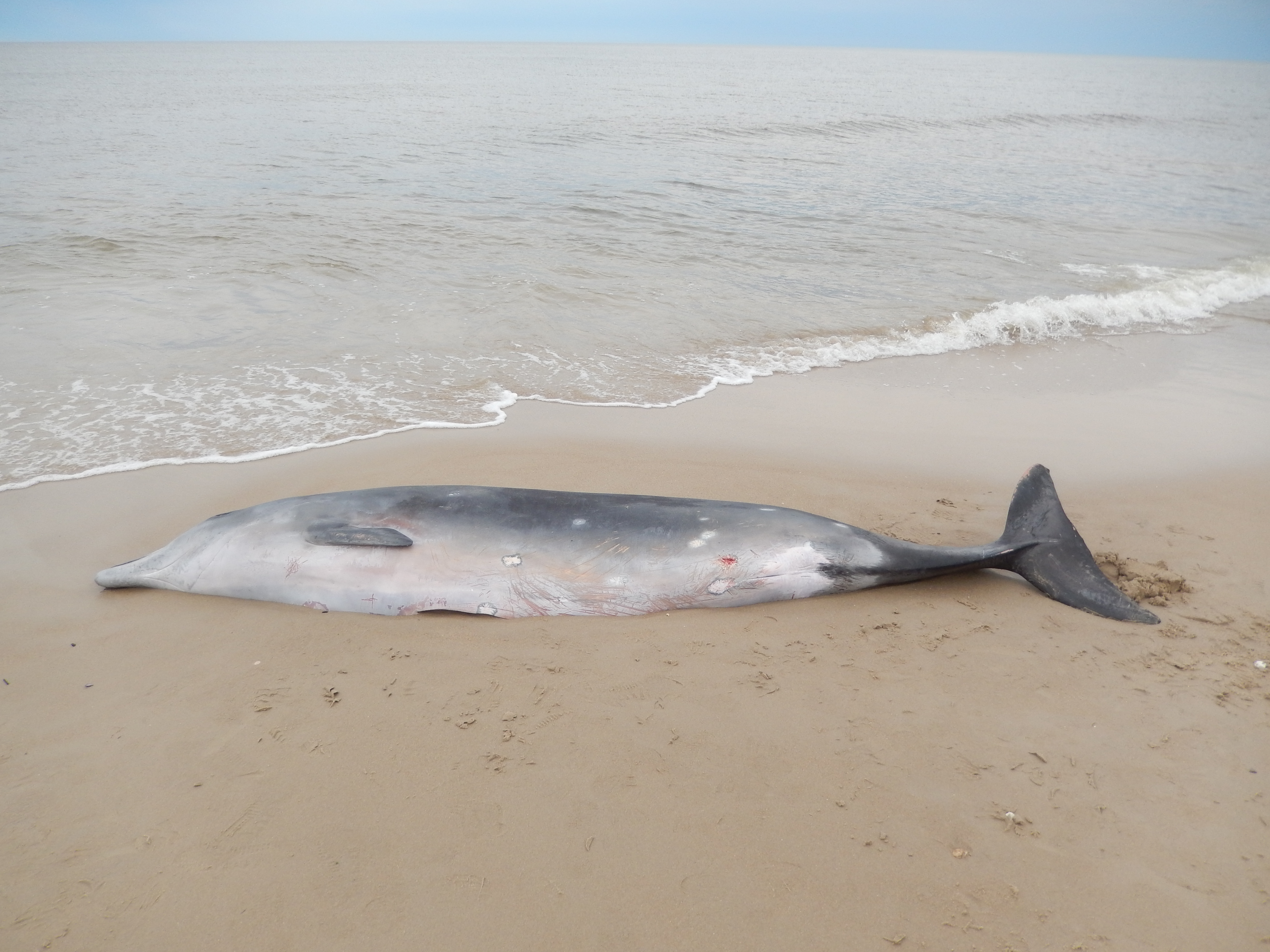
Underside of a stranded individual. Many cookiecutter shark marks are present, typical of Mesoplodon spp.

== Behavior ==
The diet of this species is very poorly understood. The stomach of an individual from South Africa contained squid (Teuthowenia sp.) and unidentified fish remains. It is presumed to be a deep-diving suction-feeder like other Mesoplodon species, creating a negative pressure cavity in its mouth by retracting its tongue and expanding the throat grooves, powerfully drawing prey inside like a biological vacuum.

== See also ==
- List of living mammal species described in the 2020s
