= Janetta McStay =

Concert pianist

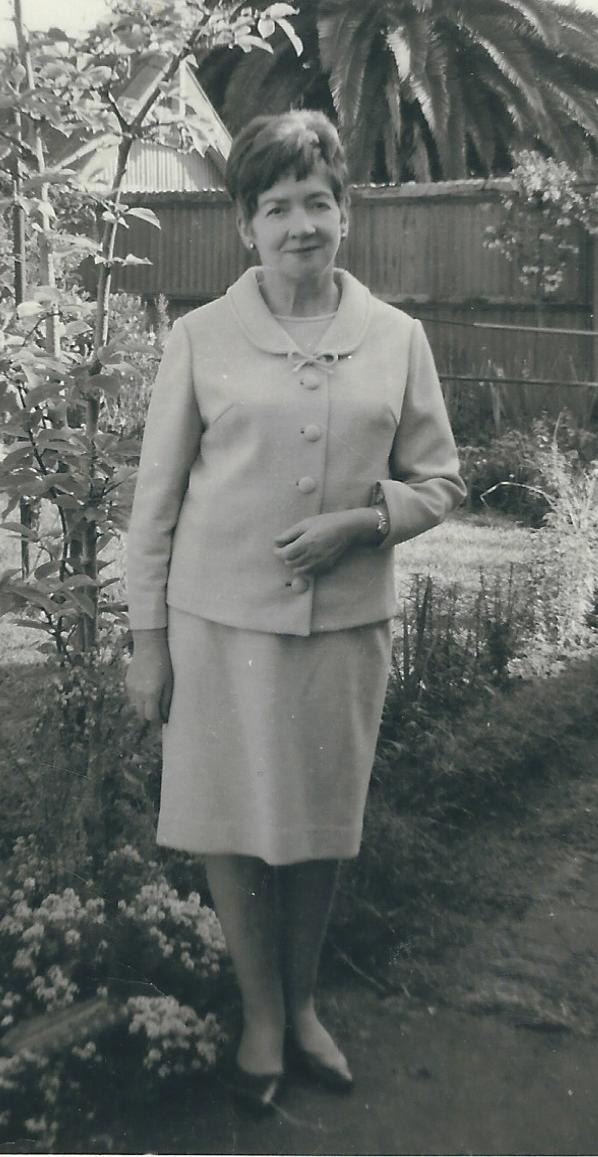
McStay in 1967, outside her Wynyard Street studio at the University of Auckland

Janetta Mary McStay CBE (20 May 1917 – 14 June 2012) was a New Zealand concert pianist and music professor who performed with the New Zealand Symphony Orchestra and other orchestras, as a solo artist and as an accompanist and chamber music associate with leading artists from around the world.

== Early life and education ==
McStay was born on 20 May 1917 in Roxburgh, New Zealand. She had Scottish and Irish heritage and grew up in Invercargill in a musical family of six children. Her mother, Mary (née Auld) enjoyed singing Scottish songs. Her father, Hugh William McStay, had no formal musical education but great natural talent that enabled him to play almost any instrument. He died when she was 14.

McStay attended Southland Girls' High School. She studied piano from the age of five, first under Mona Rankin and then under May O'Byrne (later May Jones), and gained high marks in piano exams, including the highest marks in the country in Grade Eight and the highest marks in the South Island for her licentiate exam. While still at school, she played in country concerts for local farming communities and in a school orchestra led by Alex Lindsay, later a highly acclaimed professional musician himself.

At age 17, she was awarded an Associated Board Scholarship to London. A bequest from a great-uncle and fundraising by the local Invercargill community helped to raise money for her to go, and in 1935, aged 18, she sailed to England to study at the Royal Academy of Music in London.

During her studies, she won a number of prizes and awards, including the Challen gold medal, the Walter Macfarren gold medal, and the Janet Duff Greet Prize for a performance of contemporary music.

== Professional career ==
In 1939, with war looming and her studies finished, McStay took up a teaching job at St Swithun's School, Winchester. Later in the war, she auditioned for Entertainments National Service Association (ENSA), and joined a small classical music concert party under Walter Legge, which toured England, Holland, Belgium and France (and after the war, to the occupied zone of Germany) from 1942 to 1946 to play to the armed forces.

In 1947, she travelled for the first time to Spain (a country that continued to fascinate her for the rest of her life). She toured England with a small group of Spanish artists under the auspices of the Arts Council of Great Britain. She also played in numerous broadcasts for the BBC.

In 1954, she returned to New Zealand where she took up the first of many contracts with the New Zealand Broadcasting Corporation and began a series of nationwide tours for the New Zealand Chamber Music Federation (now Chamber Music New Zealand) and the Community Arts Service, playing in venues that ranged from concert halls to people's homes. She also carried out a three-month tour of Japan as pianist for English violinist Maurice Clare.

Over the following years she played with the Alex Lindsay String Orchestra, the New Zealand Wind Quintet, the New Zealand Symphony Orchestra (NZSO) and visiting conductors such as Karel Ančerl and Alceo Galliera. She played with some of the greatest artists from around the world including, among others, violinists Szymon Goldberg, Ruggiero Ricci, Ladislav Jásek and Henryk Szerying, cellist James Whitehead, trumpet players Gordon Webb and Albert McKinnon and Paul Robeson. She also worked with artists in New Zealand, such as Ruth Pearl and Marie Blaschke.

McStay performed the New Zealand premier of Shostakovich's Piano Concerto No. 2, after writing to the composer, care of the Russian State Music Agency in Moscow, to ask for a copy of his new work.

She was the featured soloist in the first NZSO Proms concert on 16 April 1955, playing Grieg's Piano Concerto in A minor. In February 1956, she was among a group of the country's leading pianists who were the first to play Wellington Town Hall's new Steinway piano; she played Mozart's C minor Concerto (K491). In 1961 she played with the Berlin Chamber Orchestra, and in 1968 she played with the Borodin Quartet. She was an excellent soloist but had a special passion for playing chamber music.

She toured from New Zealand to many countries including Indonesia, South Korea, Hong Kong, the Pacific Islands and Australia. In 1960, she and Frederick Page were invited by the Chinese Government to China to attend the National Day celebrations in October.

== Teaching ==
In 1963, McStay moved from Wellington to Auckland as the inaugural lecturer in piano at the University of Auckland Music Conservatorium. She taught there for 20 years until her retirement. Many of her students have gone on to have illustrious musical careers in New Zealand and overseas.

The Janetta McStay Prize for Pianists is now awarded by the University of Auckland in her name.

== Students ==
Some of her students included:

- Katherine Austin
- Christine Cuming
- Read Gainsford
- Jeffrey Grice
- Christine Griffiths
- David Guerin
- David James
- Patrick O'Byrne
- Cathy Riley
- Bryan Sayer

== Key appointments and qualifications ==
McStay held the LRSM (Licentiate of the Royal Schools of Music), LRAM (Licentiate of the Royal Academy of Music) and ARAM (Hon) (Honorary Associate of the Royal Academy of Music).

She was Lecturer, Senior Lecturer and Associate Professor in piano performance at the University of Auckland. She was a member of the QEII Arts Council Music Panel (1965–67, 1969–71, 1979–81) and the RNZ Concert Programme Advisory Committee, and was President of the Auckland Youth Orchestra (1984–98).

== Honours and awards ==
McStay was appointed a Member of the Order of the British Empire, for services to music, in the 1974 Queen's Birthday Honours. She was promoted to Commander of the Order of the British Empire, for services to music, in the 1989 New Year Honours.

In 1991, she was awarded an Honorary Doctorate in Music by the University of Auckland.

== Personal life ==
McStay married Frank Newhook in 1975. She died on 14 June 2012, aged 95.
