= Frank Newhook =

New Zealand mycologist and plant pathologist (1918–1999)

Frank Newhook OBE
- Born: 16 November 1918; Auckland
- Died: 1 December 1999 (aged 81)
- Education: University of Auckland
- Known for: fungal pathogens, especially Phytophthora
- Spouse(s): Agnes Marjorie Anderson, Janetta McStay
- Scientific career
- Fields: Plant pathology
- Institutions: DSIR, University of Auckland

Francis John Newhook OBE (16 November 1918 – 1 December 1999) was the head of the School of Plant Pathology at the University of Auckland, New Zealand. He was the first plant pathologist at the university, from 1966 (sponsored by New Zealand Forest Products) as an associate professor, and from 1969 a personal chair. Previously he was a scientist at the DSIR.

Newhook was born in Auckland on 16 November 1918. He was educated at Auckland Grammar School and the University of Auckland. He married (1) Agnes Marjorie Anderson (three children) and (2) pianist Janetta McStay. In World War II he was a Major in the 2nd NZEF in the Middle East and Italy.

Newhook published extensively on fungal pathogens, especially Phytophthora, and wrote over 90 scientific papers and other publications.

== Recognition ==
Newhook was awarded a Doctor of Science degree by the University of London c.1982, and was appointed an Officer of the Order of the British Empire in the 1984 Queen's Birthday Honours. As the collector of the holotype collection, the fungus Dichomitus newhookii is named after him.

In 2004, Landcare Research named one of its Auckland laboratories the FJ Newhook Microbiology Laboratory in his honour.
