= Kalervo Gulson =

Dr Kalervo N. Gulson is a sociologist of education at the University of New South Wales. He has previously held positions at the University of British Columbia and Charles Sturt University. His work has provided important insights into the role of space and place when theorizing education policy change.

Kalervo Gulson makes the claim that in today's world, particularly in inner-city areas, schools cannot operate in isolation from the communities in which they are located. In these areas, urban change and education policy change greatly influence each other. As part of his doctoral work, Kalervo examined the relationship between education and urban policy changes. His evidence was drawn from two case studies of recently implemented policies - London's 'Excellence in Cities' program and the 'Building the Future' program in inner-city Sydney.

Since completing his doctoral work, Kalervo has gone on to be a significant scholar in the emerging field of 'spatial policy studies'.
