= Judith Duncan (academic) =

New Zealand professor (1963–2015)

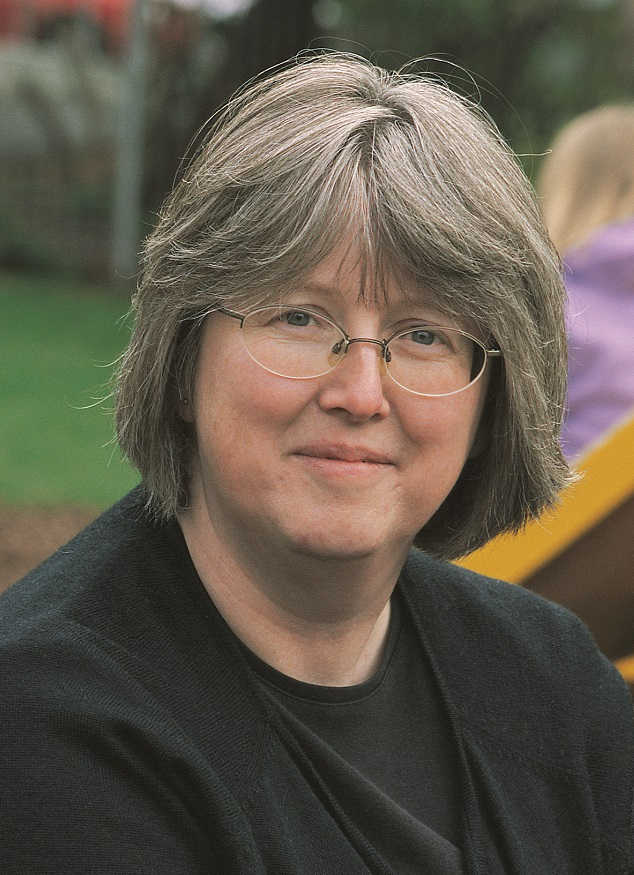
- Duncan in 2006
- Born: 1963
- Died: 26 March 2015

Academic background
- Education: University of Otago
- Thesis: Restructuring lives : kindergarten teachers and the education reforms 1984–1996 (2001)
- Doctoral advisor: Peter Rich, Mark Olssen

Judith Maree Duncan (1963 – 26 March 2015) was a New Zealand academic, and was a full professor at the University of Canterbury, specialising in early childhood education. She died of motor neurone disease in 2015.

== Career ==
Duncan trained as a teacher at Dunedin Teachers' College, graduating in 1983, and then taught at kindergartens in Dunedin and Invercargill until 1993. During this time she formed the opinion that kindergarten teaching should be done in collaboration with parents, but is difficult when parents are dealing with issues such as family violence and poverty. During her time as a teacher, the National government brought in bulk funding of kindergartens, which led to cutbacks in resourcing. As part of the protests against the reforms, Duncan was involved in activities such as "Black Monday", when every item in Dunedin kindergartens that could be turned black, was. The publicity from the protests led to the end of Duncan's teaching career, and precipitated her move into academia. Duncan completed a PhD titled Restructuring lives: kindergarten teachers and the education reforms 1984–1996 at the University of Otago in 2001, supervised by Mark Olssen and Peter Rich. From 2001, Duncan worked as a researcher with Anne Smith at the Children's Issues Centre at Otago, bringing her kindergarten experience to research on early childhood education and family resilience, and learning dispositions.

Duncan's first permanent academic appointment was as an associate professor at the University of Canterbury, in 2008. She rose to full professor in 2015, and gave her inaugural professorial lecture in the early stages of her illness.

== Personal life ==
Duncan was diagnosed with motor neurone disease in 2014, and given a maximum of two years to live. She died on 26 March 2015 in Christchurch Hospital. She is survived by her husband and son. At her memorial service, collaborator Professor Atushi Nanakida of the University of Hiroshima paid tribute to Duncan by presenting a copy of her latest book in Japanese.

== Awards and honours ==
Duncan was awarded a Life Membership of the Dunedin Kindergarten Association in 2010. She was awarded the Rosemary Seymour Research and Archives Award by the Women's Studies Association, and the Harriet Jenkins Award by the NZ Federation of Graduate Women.

The New Zealand Association for Research in Education awards the Judith Duncan Award for Early Childhood Research, to a member who "has made notable contributions to the field of early childhood education and care through the conduct of high-quality research". It has been awarded to Tara McLaughlin of Massey University (2019) and Amanda Bateman of the University of Waikato (2021).

== Selected works ==
=== Books ===
- Duncan, Judith; Conner, Lindsey, eds. (19 November 2013). Research Partnerships in Early Childhood Education. New York: Palgrave Macmillan. doi:10.1057/9781137346889. ISBN 978-1-137-35067-1.
- Duncan, Judith and Nanakida, Atushi. Early childhood education and care: Weaving with dialogue. New Zealand and Japan. (2015)
- Duncan, Judith; Te One, Sarah (24 April 2012). Comparative early childhood education services: international perspectives. Critical Cultural Studies of Childhood. New York: Palgrave Macmillan New York. ISBN 978-0-230-11976-5.
- Duncan, Judith and Nanakida, Atushi. Kosodate senshinkoku nyujirando no hoiku: Rekishi to bunka ga tsumugu kazoku shien to yoji kyoiku. (2015) ISBN 978-4571110382
- Burke, Rachael S.; Duncan, Judith (30 October 2014). Bodies as Sites of Cultural Reflection in Early Childhood Education. New York: Routledge. doi:10.4324/9781315758718.
- Duncan, Judith (1998). I spy: sexual abuse prevention policies, protection or harm?: a kindergarten case study (published presentation). Wellington: Institute for Early Childhood Studies, Victoria University of Wellington. ISBN 9780475200525.

=== Journal articles ===
- Liz Jones; Duncan, Judith Maree (2013). "Deleuze and Early Years Education: Explorations in Theory and Lived Experiences". Global Studies of Childhood. 3 (3): 203–207. doi:10.2304/gsch.2013.3.3.203. Wikidata Q124296317.
- Duncan, Judith Maree; Sandy Eaton (2013). "A Rhizomatic Experiment with Learning Stories". Global Studies of Childhood. 3 (3): 318–327. doi:10.2304/gsch.2013.3.3.318. Wikidata Q124296318.
- Smith, Briar Anne; Duncan, Judith Maree; Kate Marshall (2005). "Children's perspectives on their learning: exploring methods". Early Child Development and Care. 175 (6): 473–487. doi:10.1080/03004430500131270. Wikidata Q124296323.
- Duncan, Judith Maree (2007). "New Zealand free kindergartens: free or freely forgotten?". International Journal of Qualitative Studies in Education. 20 (3): 319–333. doi:10.1080/09518390701281926. Wikidata Q124296784.
- Duncan, Judith Maree; Chris Bowden; Smith, Briar Anne (2006). "A gossip or a good yack? Reconceptualizing parent support in New Zealand early childhood centre based programmes 1". International Journal of Early Years Education. 14 (1): 1–13. doi:10.1080/09669760500446358. Wikidata Q124296783.
