= New York Chamber Virtuosi =

Chamber music organization in New York City

- Orchestra
- Short name: NYCV
- Founded: 2009, by Jessica Sibelman

The New York Chamber Virtuosi (NYCV) is an orchestra and chamber music organization based in New York City. It was founded by clarinetist and composer Jessica Sibelman in 2009.

== History ==
According to its mission statement, the NYCV seeks to combine "New York's energetic young professionals with a fresh approach to breaking down musical boundaries between the performer and audience. While keeping true to the classic orchestra, the NYCV looks to combine orchestral literature with a twist, to make classical music more accessible to a growing, diverse public."

The NYCV has presented orchestral music performances in a variety of settings, including prominent venues such as Carnegie Hall's Zankel Hall and Merkin Hall in New York City. Through its Soiree Series, the NYCV has performed at the Gershwin Hotel, assorted arts spaces in New York and New Jersey, and educational institutions.

The NYCV has also presented a series of educational workshops for adults and children through its Outreach Series and Family Concert programs.
