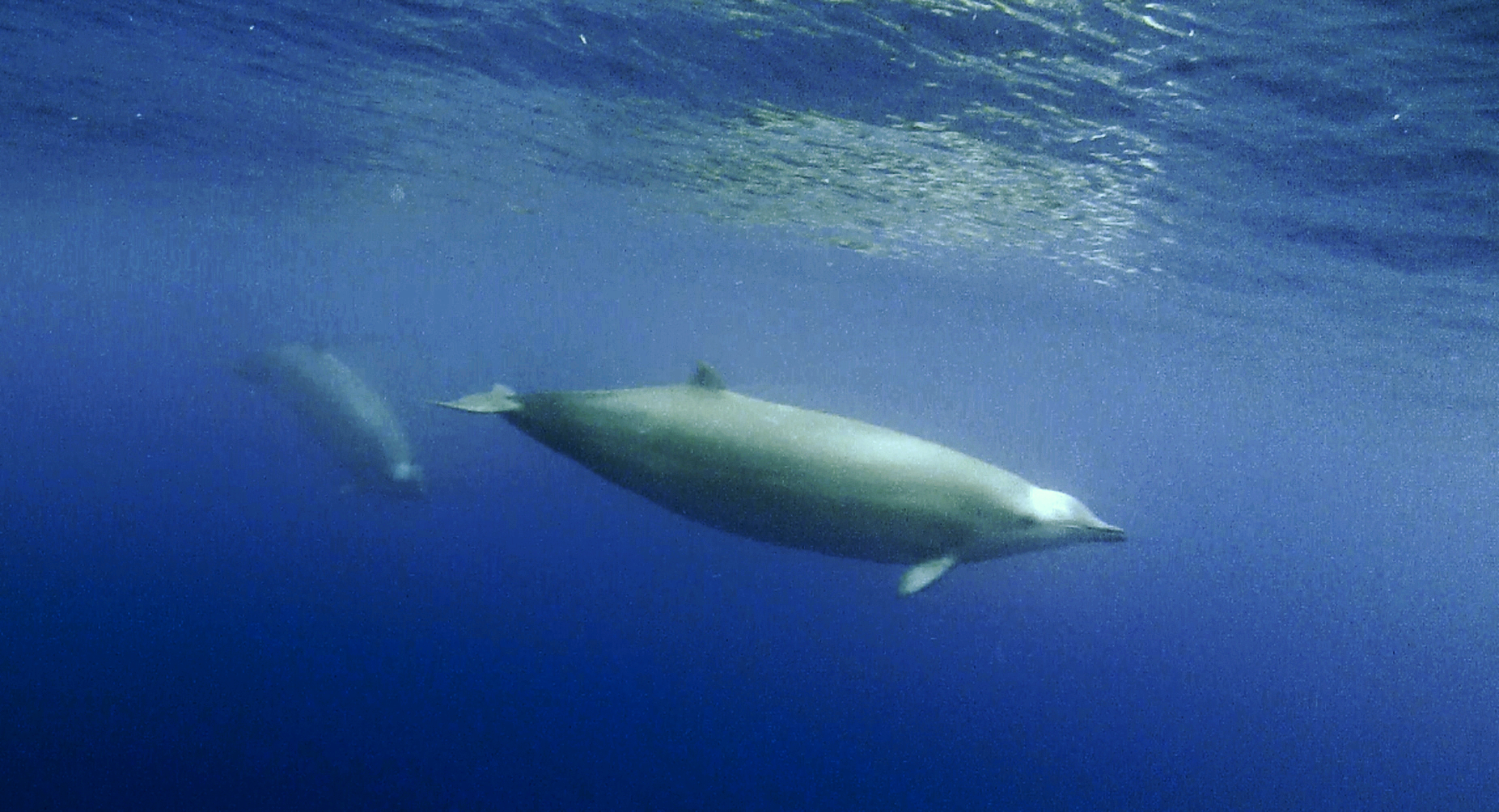
- True's beaked whale observed off Pico, Azores showing a pale blaze on the melon
- Size compared to an average human

Conservation status
- Least Concern (IUCN 3.1)
- CITES Appendix II

Scientific classification
- Kingdom: Animalia
- Phylum: Chordata
- Class: Mammalia
- Order: Artiodactyla
- Infraorder: Cetacea
- Family: Ziphiidae
- Genus: Mesoplodon
- Species: M. mirus

Binomial name
- Mesoplodon mirus True, 1913
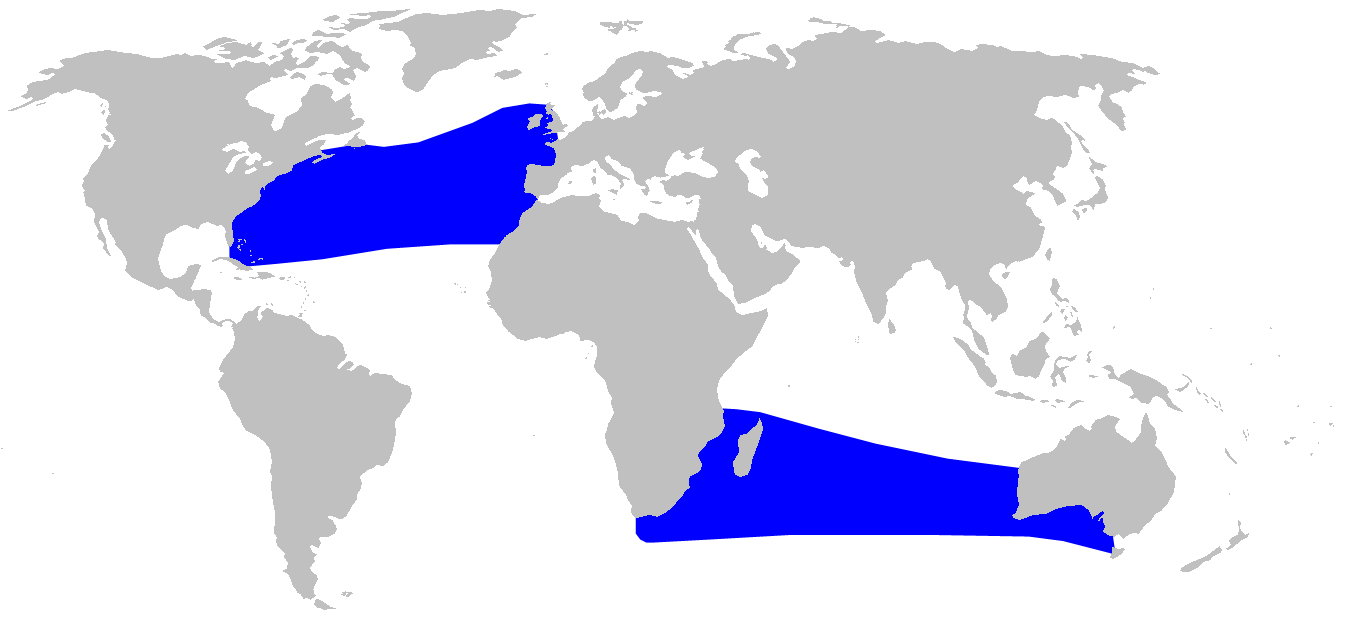
- True's beaked whale range (includes range of M. eueu)

= True's beaked whale =

Species of mammal

True's beaked whale (Mesoplodon mirus) is a medium-sized whale in the genus Mesoplodon. It is native to the northern Atlantic Ocean. The common name is in reference to Frederick W. True, a curator at the United States National Museum (now the Smithsonian).

== Taxonomy ==
The species was first described in 1913 by Frederick W. True from an adult female that had stranded on the outer bank of Bird Island Shoal, Beaufort Harbor, North Carolina, in July 1912.

Previously, this species was thought to have two separate populations representing potential subspecies; one in the North Atlantic, and another in the southern Indian Ocean. However, in 2021 the Indian Ocean population (which was found to have a significantly wider range throughout the Southern Hemisphere) was described as a distinct species: Ramari's beaked whale (M. eueu).

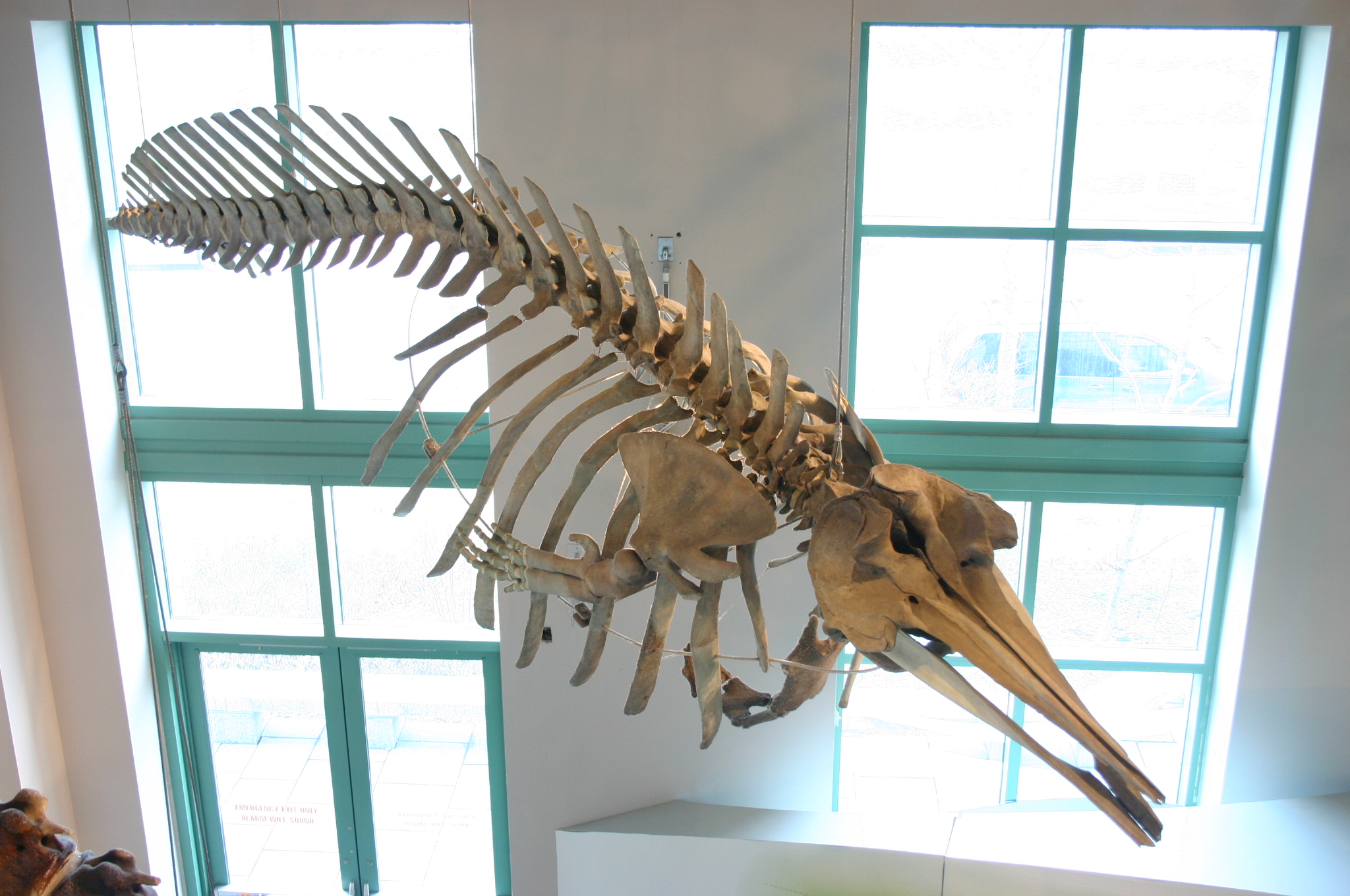
Skeleton of a True's beaked whale at the North Carolina Museum of Natural Sciences in Raleigh, North Carolina

== Physical description ==
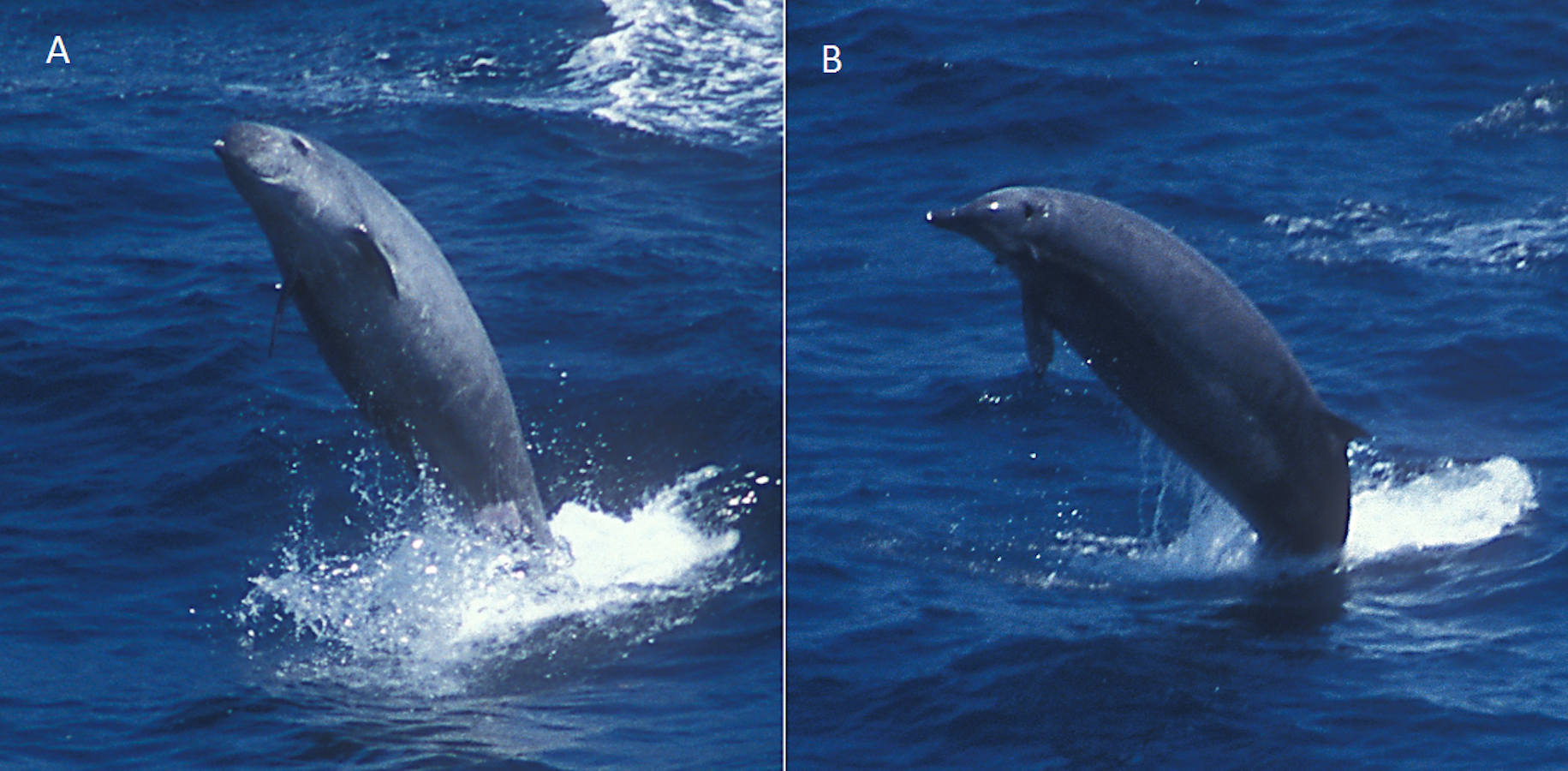
True's beaked whales sometimes breach.

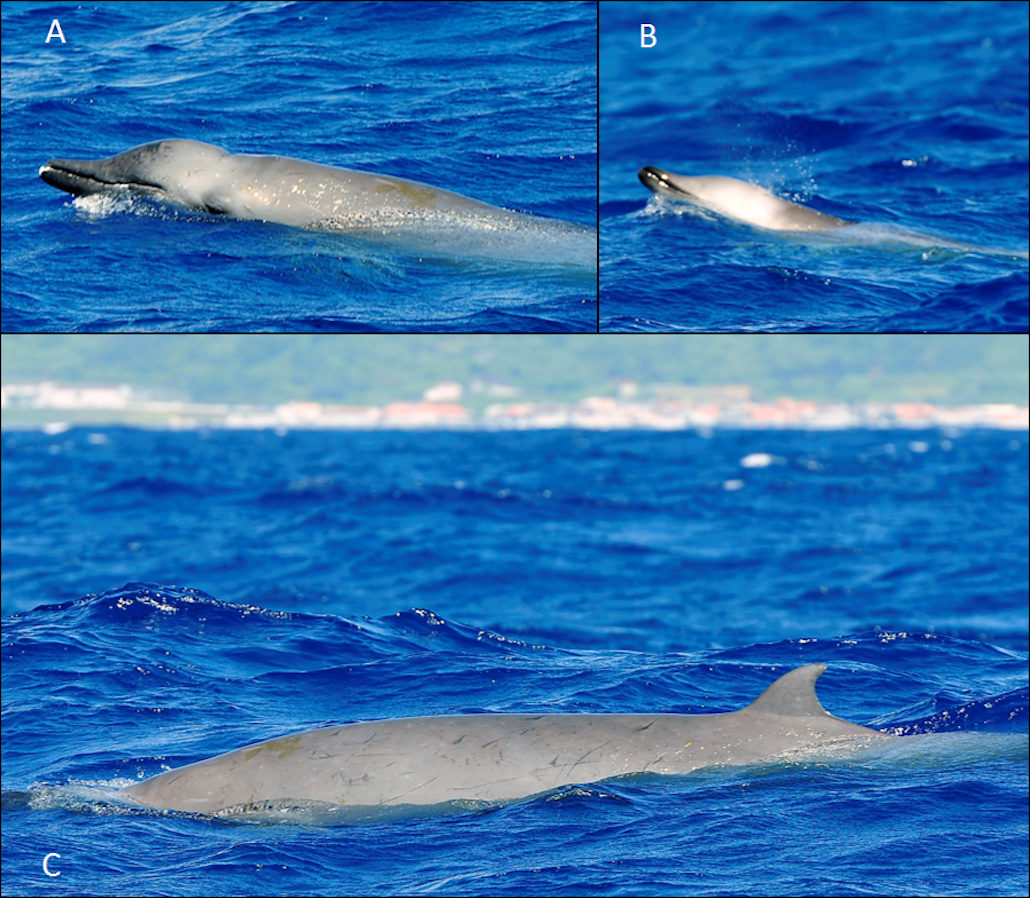
Surfacing patterns of True's beaked whales

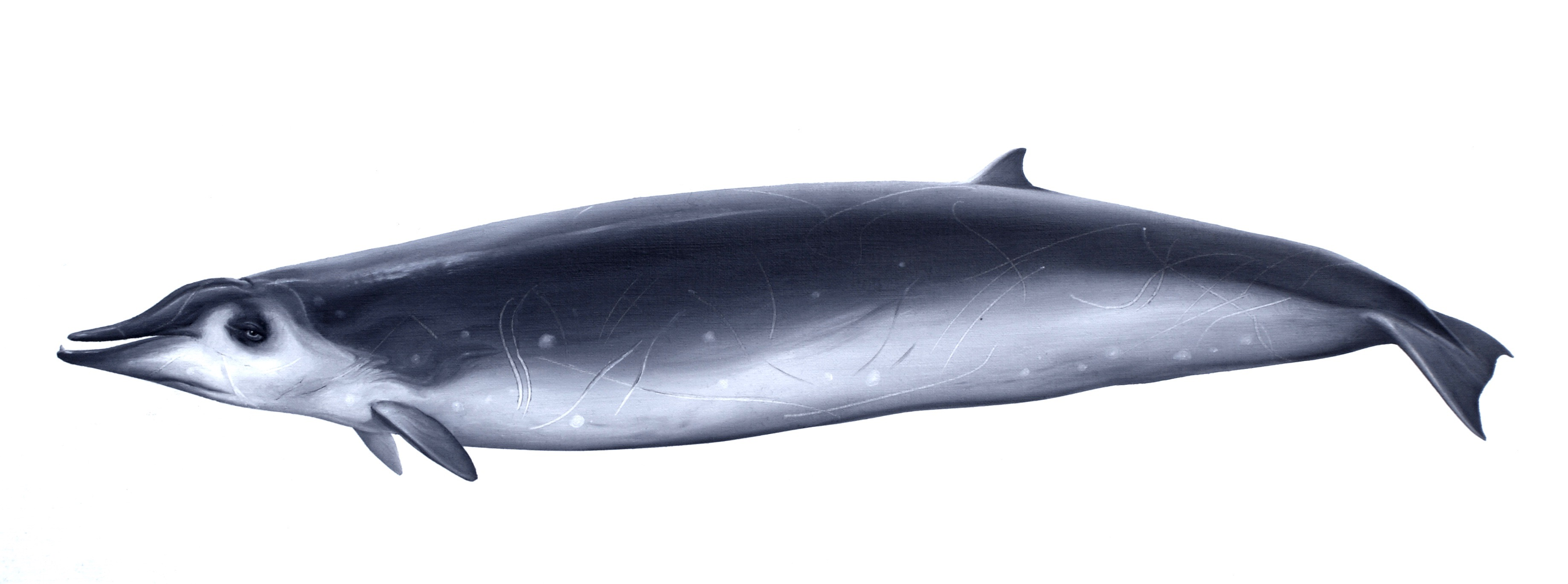
Painting of adult

This whale has a normal mesoplodont body, except that it is rotund in the middle and tapering towards the ends. The two distinctive teeth on the males are small and set on the very end of the beak (however additional teeth have been recorded). The melon is rather bulbous, and leads into a short beak. There is a crease behind the blowhole, and a sharp dorsal ridge on the back near the dorsal fin. The coloration is gray to brownish gray on the back which is lighter below, and notably darker on the "lips", around the eye, and near the dorsal fin. There is sometimes a dark blaze between the head and dorsal fin as well. One female in the Southern Hemisphere was bluish black with a white area between the dorsal fin and tail as well as a light gray jaw and throat, as well as black speckling. One individual from the Canary Islands had an area of white from snout to blowhole. Scars from fighting and cookiecutter sharks are present on males. This species reaches around 5.3 metres (17 ft) with the females weighing 1,400 kilograms (3,100 lb) and the males weighing 1,010 kilograms (2,230 lb). They are around 2.2 metres (7.2 ft) long when born.

== Behavior ==
Underwater video of True's beaked whales recorded off the Azores by R Edler within the Master Mint program

They have been seen in small groups, and are believed to be squid eaters. The most complete description of recorded live sightings and strandings, as well as the first underwater footage, was published in a 2017 article by Natacha Aguilar de Soto in the open access journal PeerJ.

== Population and distribution ==
This species is found predominantly in the North Atlantic and has stranded from Nova Scotia in the western Atlantic to Ireland in the eastern Atlantic and as far south as Florida, the Bahamas, and Canary Islands. However true's beaked whales have also been found stranded on the south-east coast of South Africa, Brazil, South Australia, and New Zealand indicating a presence in both the Southern Atlantic Ocean and the Indian Ocean.

== Conservation ==
This species has not been hunted and has not been a victim of fishing nets. True's beaked whale is covered by the Agreement on the Conservation of Small Cetaceans of the Baltic, North East Atlantic, Irish and North Seas (ASCOBANS) and the Agreement on the Conservation of Cetaceans in the Black Sea, Mediterranean Sea and Contiguous Atlantic Area (ACCOBAMS). The species is further included in the Memorandum of Understanding Concerning the Conservation of the Manatee and Small Cetaceans of Western Africa and Macaronesia (Western African Aquatic Mammals MoU) and the Memorandum of Understanding for the Conservation of Cetaceans and Their Habitats in the Pacific Islands Region (Pacific Cetaceans MoU).

== See also ==
- List of cetaceans

== Bibliography ==
- Perrin, William F.; Wursig, Bernd; Thewissen, J. G. M., eds. (2002). Encyclopedia of Marine Mammals. Academic Press. ISBN 0-12-551340-2.
- Reeves, Randall R.; Steward, Brent S.; Clapham, Phillip J.; Owell, James A. (2002). Sea Mammals of the World. London: A & C Black. ISBN 0-7136-6334-0.
- Rare species found dead
- http://oceanfm.ie/news/2009/03/21/strandhill-whale-one-of-the-worlds-rarest-species/
- Dead whale found on Buckroe Beach in Hampton (VA) (Nov. 9, 2009)
- "Beached whale first of its kind in New Zealand". The New Zealand Herald. February 8, 2012.
- True's beaked whale (Mesoplodon mirus) in Macaronesia (Mar. 7, 2017)
