= William Arthur Sewell =

University professor of English (1903–1972)

- Born: 9 August 1903; Goole, Yorkshire, England
- Died: 19 April 1972 (aged 68); Hamilton, New Zealand
- Occupation: university professor of English
- Spouse: Rosemary Seymour (m. 1951)
- Children: 1 son, William Seymour Sewell

William Arthur Sewell (9 August 1903 – 19 April 1972) was a university professor of English. Arthur Sewell was born in Goole, Yorkshire, England on 9 August 1903. He was appointed to the chair of English at Auckland University College in 1933 and moved to New Zealand. In 1945 he returned to England from Auckland. In 1946 he became the Byron professor of English at the University of Athens. He was then director of the British Institute in Barcelona (1952–53), and professor of English at the University of Ankara (1954–56) and the American University of Beirut (1956–65). He returned to New Zealand in 1965 to become professor of English at the University of Waikato until he retired in 1969. He died in Hamilton on 19 April 1972.

== Personal life ==
In 1951 he married Rosemary Seymour. They had one son, William Seymour Sewell.
