= Agreement on the Conservation of Cetaceans of the Black Sea, Mediterranean Sea and Contiguous Atlantic Area =

International treaty protecting cetaceans

ACCOBAMS
Agreement on the Conservation of Cetaceans of the Black Sea, Mediterranean Sea and contiguous Atlantic Area
- Type: Multilateral
- Context: Cetacea conservation
- Signed: 24 November 1996
- Location: Monaco
- Effective: 1 June 2001
- Condition: Ratification by seven range states
- Parties: 24 States: Albania; Algeria; Bulgaria; Croatia; Cyprus; Egypt; France; Georgia; Greece; Italy; Lebanon; Libya; Malta; Monaco; Montenegro; Morocco; Portugal; Romania; Slovenia; Spain; Syria; Tunisia; Turkey; Ukraine
- Depositary: Government of Monaco
- Languages: Arabic; English; French; Russian; Spanish

The Agreement on the Conservation of Cetaceans of the Black Sea, Mediterranean Sea and contiguous Atlantic Area, or ACCOBAMS, is a regional international treaty that binds its States Parties on the conservation of Cetacea in their territories. The Agreement aims is to reduce threats to Cetaceans in the Mediterranean and Black Seas, as well as in the contiguous Atlantic area west of the Straits of Gibraltar.

== Bodies of the agreement ==
=== Meeting of the Parties ===
The Meeting of the Parties (MOP) is the main decision-making body of the Agreement. It meets triennially to review progress made towards the implementation of the Agreement, as well as any challenges this implantation faces. The MOP also adopts the budget for the Agreements and reviews scientific assessments on the conservation status of cetaceans of the Agreement area. Finally, at the MOP, member states also lay out the priorities for the next triennium.

Member states of the Agreement are automatically entitled to representation at the MOP and each have one vote. Additionally, organisations qualified in the conservation of cetaceans may also be represented by observers in the MOP.

=== Bureau ===
The Bureau is the working body of the agreement and acts as the decision-making body for the agreement in-between the MOP, and carries out interim activities on it behalf. It also provides guidance to the Secretariat concerning the implementation and promotion of the Agreement.

The Bureau is composed of a Chair and Vice-Chairs, all elected by the MOP. Additionally, the Chair of the Scientific Committee is invited to participate as an observer. The Bureau meets at least once a year.

=== Secretariat ===
The Secretariat is the executive body of the Agreement. It coordinates and organises the activities of the MOP, the Bureau and the Scientific Committee in order to ensure they can fully perform their assigned duties. Additionally, it monitors the budget, works to increase public awareness concerning the Agreement and its objectives, executes decisions addressed to it by the MOP and creates a report to present at each MOP on the work of all bodies of the Agreement.

=== Scientific Committee ===
The Scientific Committee acts as an advisory body to the MOP. Its main duties include:

- Providing advice to the MOP on scientific and technical matters
- Conducting scientific assessments of the conservation status of cetacean populations in the Agreement Area
- Advising on the development and co-ordination of international research and monitoring programmes
- Preparing for each session of the MOP a report of its activities

The Scientific Committee is composed of "persons qualified as experts in cetacean conservation science" and meets at the request of the MOP.

== Agreement area ==
This map shows the following: Agreement Area Agreement Area Extension Member States Range States

According to Article 1 of the Agreement, the geographic scope of this Agreement is as follows:

- All the maritime waters of the Black Sea and the Mediterranean, and their gulfs and seas
- The internal waters connected to, or interconnecting, these maritime waters
- The Atlantic area contiguous to the Mediterranean Sea west of the Straits of Gibraltar

In 2010, at MOP4, Portugal and Spain both submitted proposals to extend the Agreement area to cover parts of their respective exclusive economic zones. The proposal was adopted at the MOP, as Resolution A/4.1, and is currently in effect.

== Species ==
The Agreement covers 28 species of Cetacean that migrate throughout the range of the Agreement.

Balaenidae

- North Atlantic Right Whale (Eubalaena glacialis)

Balaenopteridae

- Common Minke Whale (Balaenoptera acutorostrata)
- Sei whale (Balaenoptera borealis)
- Humpback Whale (Megaptera novaeangliae)
- Blue Whale (Balaenoptera musculus)
- Fin Whale (Balaenoptera physalus)

Delphinidae

- Bottlenose Dolphin (Tursiops truncatus)
- Risso's Dolphin (Grampus griseus)
- Killer Whale (Orcinus orca)
- Pygmy Killer Whale (Feresa attenuata)
- Long-Finned Pilot Whale (Globicephala melas)
- Rough-Toothed Dolphin (Steno bredanensis)
- Striped dolphin (Stenella coeruleoalba)
- Short-Finned Pilot Whale (Globicephala macrorhynchus)
- Common Dolphin (Delphinus delphis)
- False Killer Whale (Pseudorca crassidens)
- Black Sea Common Bottlenose Dolphin (Tursiops truncatus ponticus)

Kogiidae

- Pygmy Sperm Whale (Kogia breviceps)
- Dwarf Sperm Whale (Kogia sima)

Phocoenidae

- Harbour Porpoise (Phocoena phocoena)
- Black Sea Harbour Porpoise (Phocoena phocoena relicta)

Physeteridae

- Sperm Whale (Physeter macrocephalus)
- Dwarf Sperm Whale (Kogia simus)

Ziphiidae

- Blainville's Beaked Whale (Mesoplodon densirostris)
- Sowerby's Beaked Whale (Mesoplodon bidens)
- Gervais' Beaked Whale (Mesoplodon europaeus)
- True's Beaked Whale (Mesoplodon mirus)
- Cuvier's Beaked Whale (Ziphius cavirostris)

== Member States ==
=== States Parties ===
The following are all the States Parties to the Agreement, as well as the date the Agreement entered into force in waters under their jurisdiction:

List of States Parties to ACCOBAMS
Country	Signature	Ratification	Entry into Force
Albania	24 November 1996	25 May 2001	1 October 2001
Algeria	–	19 March 2007	1 December 2007
Bulgaria	16 September 1999	23 September 1999	1 June 2001
Croatia	24 November 1996	3 May 2000	1 June 2001
Cyprus	24 November 1996	30 January 2006	1 May 2006
Egypt	–	4 March 2010	1 July 2010
France	24 November 1996	26 February 2004	1 June 2004
Georgia	24 November 1996	30 March 2001	1 June 2001
Greece	24 November 1996	24 November 1996	1 June 2001
Italy	24 November 1996	10 February 2005	1 September 2005
Lebanon	–	5 May 2004	1 March 2005
Libya	–	12 May 2002	1 September 2002
Malta	23 March 2001	23 March 2001	1 June 2001
Monaco	24 November 1996	25 April 2001	1 June 2001
Montenegro	–	17 February 2009	1 August 2009
Morocco	28 March 1997	13 May 1999	1 June 2001
Portugal	24 November 1996	30 September 2004	1 January 2005
Romania	28 September 1998	13 June 2000	1 June 2001
Slovenia	–	12 July 2006	1 December 2006
Spain	24 November 1996	7 January 2001	1 June 2001
Syrian Arab Republic	–	7 February 2002	1 June 2002
Tunisia	24 November 1996	21 December 2001	1 April 2002
Turkey	–	29 May 2017	1 February 2018
Ukraine	–	9 July 2003	1 January 2004

=== Range States ===
The following are the Range States that have not ratified or acceded to the Agreement:
Signed, but not ratified:

- Israel
- European Union

Other Range States:

- Bosnia and Herzegovina
- Russian Federation
- United Kingdom of Great Britain and Northern Ireland

== See also ==
- List of environmental agreements
- ASCOBANS
- Convention on Migratory Species (CMS)
- Marine Protected Area
- Mediterranean cetaceans
