= List of cetartiodactyls described in the 2000s =

This page is a list of species of the branch Cetartiodactyla discovered in the 2000s. This branch contains animals classified under the orders Cetacea and Artiodactyla. See also parent page Mammals discovered in the 2000s.

== Moschiola kathygre (2005) ==
Moschiola kathygre, a new species of chevrotain, was named in 2005. The small deer can be found in the wet zones of Sri Lanka.

== Australian snubfin dolphin (Orcaella heinsohni 2005) ==
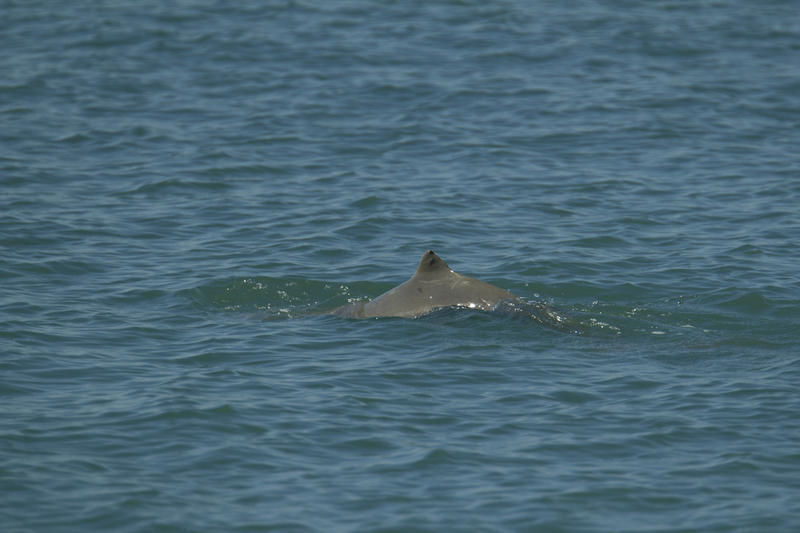
Australian snubfin dolphin

The Australian snubfin dolphin (Orcaella heinsohni), is a species discovered distinct to the closely related Irrawaddy dolphin in 2005. It was the first dolphin species to be named for at least 30 years.

== Giant forest peccary (2004) ==
A possible fourth species of peccary, dubbed the giant forest peccary, was discovered in Brazil in 2004. The peccary is said to be larger and behave differently to the three known species. The creature's discoverers claim to have first encountered the animal being killed and eaten by villagers.

== Omura's whale (Balaenoptera omurai 2003) ==
In 2003, Japanese scientists announced the discovery of a new species of rorqual, named Omura's whale (Balaenoptera omurai), after extensive studies of Bryde's whale (B. brydei). The scientists also claimed their research settled a long-standing taxonomic argument, and Bryde's whale and the pygmy Bryde's whale (B. edeni) are in fact two distinct species.

== Perrin's beaked whale (Mesoplodon perrini 2002) ==
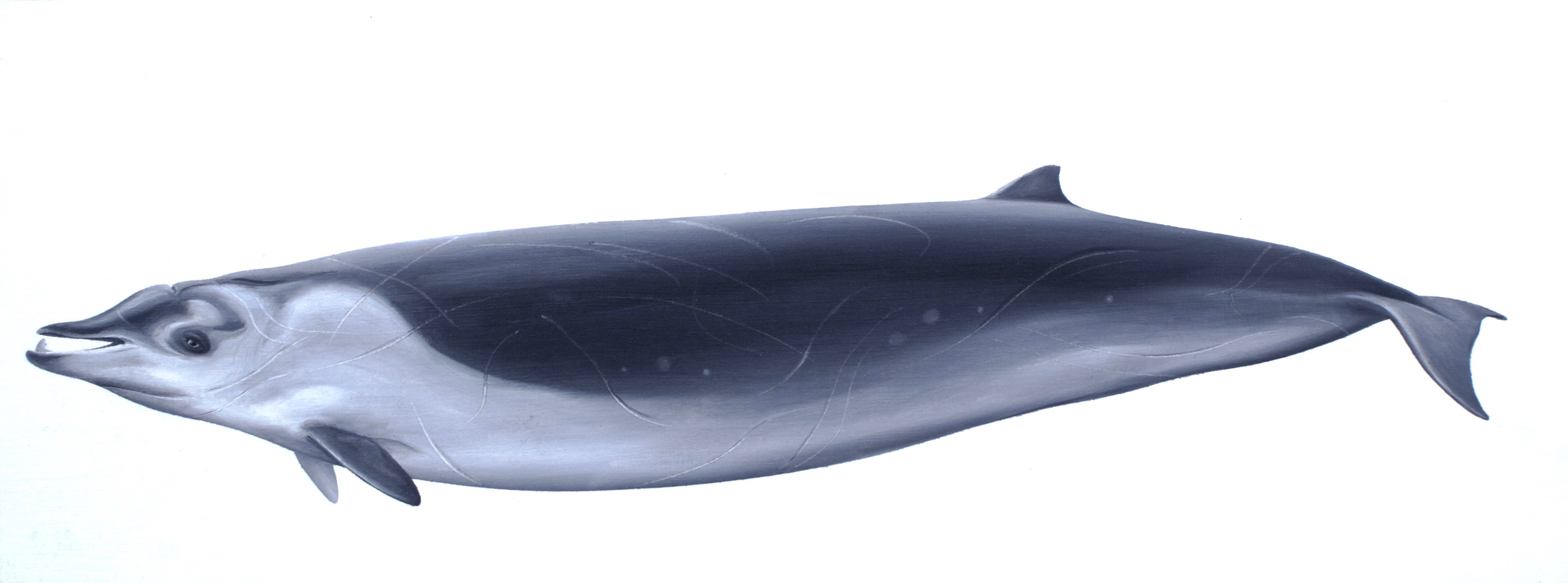
Perrin's beaked whale

Perrin's beaked whale (Mesoplodon perrini) was named as a new species in 2002. It was originally found in 1975 off the coast of California, but misidentified as Hector's beaked whale (Mesoplodon hectori). It is now thought to be more closely related to the pygmy beaked whale (Mesoplodon peruvianus), which was only itself described in 1991.

== North Pacific right whale (Eubalaena japonica 2000) ==
In 2000, DNA testing confirmed the theory that there are three species of right whale, as the North Pacific right whale (Eubalaena japonica) is a distinct species from the North Atlantic right whale (E.glacialis). Strictly speaking, this is not a newly discovered species, but simply an alternative taxonomic treatment, as japonica already was widely recognized, but "only" as a subspecies.

== Roosevelt's muntjac (Muntiacus rooseveltorum 1999/2000) ==
In 1999, genetic research was conducted on a mysterious specimen of muntjac found in a Laos menagerie in 1995. The unusual black deer was discovered to be Roosevelt's muntjac (Muntiacus rooseveltorum), a species previously known to science only from a single individual, discovered in 1929.
