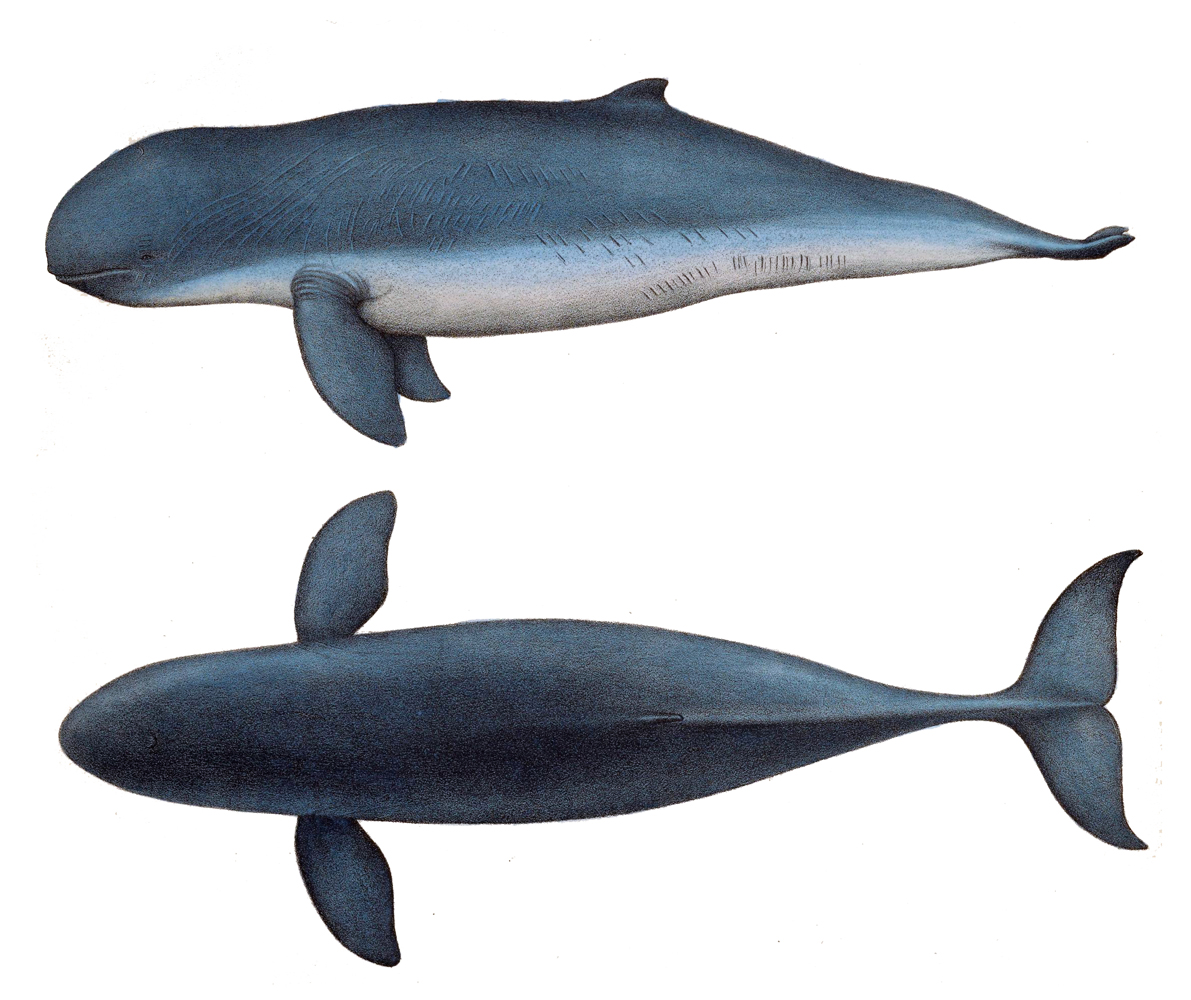
- Orcaella brevirostris

Scientific classification
- Kingdom: Animalia
- Phylum: Chordata
- Class: Mammalia
- Order: Artiodactyla
- Infraorder: Cetacea
- Family: Delphinidae
- Subfamily: Globicephalinae
- Genus: Orcaella; Gray, 1866

Type species
- Orca (Orcaella) brevirostris Owen in Gray, 1866

Species
- Orcaella brevirostris Orcaella heinsohni
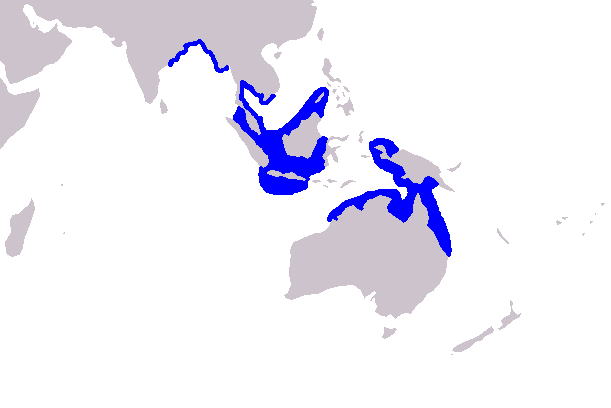
- Distribution of genus Orcaella

= Orcaella =

Snubfin dolphins

Genus of mammals

The snubfin dolphins (Orcaella) are a genus of cetaceans containing two members: the Irrawaddy dolphin (Orcaella brevirostris) and the Australian snubfin dolphin (Orcaella heinsohni). The genus was long believed to be monotypic with the only species being the Irrawaddy dolphin; however, in 2005, supposed Irrawaddy dolphin populations inhabiting the Australian/New Guinean regions were found to be significantly different and were declared a separate new species named the Australian snubfin dolphin.

== Taxonomy and evolution ==
Until 2005, Orcaella brevirostris was the only recognized species in the genus Orcaella. However, comparisons within the populations of Orcaella inhabiting the Asia region and populations inhabiting the Australia/New Guinea region show distinctions in habitat, morphology, and genetics. Morphological differences include skull shape, presence or absence of a median dorsal groove in front of the dorsal fin, height of dorsal fin, and coloration. Genetic analysis constitutes a 5.9% difference between the two populations. In 2005, these significant distinctions considered by Beasley, Arnold and Robertson warranted a taxonomic split of the genus Orcaella into two separate species, Orcaella brevirostris and Orcaella heinsohni. Orcaella brevirostris known as the Irrawaddy dolphin consists of the Asian population. The newly recognized species, known as the Australian snubfin dolphin, consists of the Australian/New Guinea population.

The snubfin dolphins (Orcaella) contain two of the 35 species of oceanic dolphins that make up the Cetacean family of Delphinidae. The phylogenetic status of Orcaella has long been confused. Although the snubfin dolphins share similar external features with the Monodontidae (narwhal), a genetic study conducted by Arnason and Gretarsdottir identified the 'Irrawaddy dolphin' as a delphinid. In their study, phylogenetic information obtained from a highly repetitive DNA (hrDNA) component characteristic of all cetaceans show that Orcaella share close relationships with the Delphinidae rather than the Monodontidae.

Some molecular analyses indicate that the genus Orcaella is closely related to the orca of the genus Orcinus, the two of them together forming the subfamily Orcininae. However, more recent studies have firmly found that Orcaella belongs in the Globicephalinae.

== Habitat ==
Irrawaddy dolphins are mainly found in shallow and coastal waters in the Indo-West Pacific region. The Range of their presence stretches from the Bay of Bengal to the northeastern Australian Coast. One of their most common habitats are in the Mekong River of southern Laos, Ranging from the Khone Falls all the way to the Cambodian Border. Much of the data on the Irrawaddy dolphins of this region is collected by the Lao shore, where they are sighted daily during the dry season supposedly due to the importance of deep-water pools in the area. Their geographic range also extends to the coasts of Bangladesh, Myanmar, Thailand, Vietnam, Malaysia, Singapore, and Indonesia with some even being restricted to freshwater environments such as certain bodies of water in India and Thailand. They are known to stay relatively close to the shore, with most sightings being as close 1.6 kilometers off the shoreline and as far as 5 kilometers.

== Population ==
In the western Gulf of Carpentaria in Australia, an estimate of one thousand specimens were calculated, though this number may be incorrect due to the lack of visibility when looking into the water and the unpredictable movement patterns of the dolphins. These dolphins form small groups of around ten, with information leading researchers to believe that they only occur in small, localized populations, rather than large groups that travel together. In spite of this, it is difficult to specifically designate a number for their population due to outstanding factors such as the large lack of data and human interference.

== Characteristics ==
=== Irrawaddy dolphin ===
The Irrawaddy dolphin shares similar physical characteristics with the beluga whale, but its genetic makeup ties the Irrawaddy dolphin and the killer whale as close relatives of one another. Irrawaddy dolphins have a slate blue to a slate gray color and their bodies can grow up to 180-275 centimeters in length.

Irrawaddy dolphins eat fish and crustaceans and are rarely found by themselves. They are usually found in groups of around ten dolphins. These dolphins swim rather slowly while scouting for areas. They will raise their heads above the water and continue to swim around to familiarize themselves with their surroundings.

=== Australian snubfin dolphin ===
Australian snubfin dolphins are very similar to the Irrawaddy dolphins, however, while the bodies of Irrawaddy dolphins are two-colored, the bodies of Australian snubfins are three-colored. Australian snubfins can vary in color from a gray to a blue-gray. Their white underside, including the belly and genitals, helps in distinguishing them from the Irrawaddy dolphins. The Australian snubfins do not have a beak, but their necks, like the necks of Irrawaddy dolphins, are very flexible which leave creases or wrinkles behind their heads. Australian snubfins are shy and tend to stay away from boats. The skulls and fins of Australian snubfins also have slight variations from the Irrawaddy dolphins. Similar to the Irrawaddy, the Australian snubfins feed on fish and fish eggs, crustaceans, and cephalopods.

The bodies of the female Australian snubfin dolphins can grow up to 2.3m while the male bodies can grow up to 2.7m. Like the Irrawaddy dolphins, the Australian snubfins can weigh up to 130 kg.

Australian snubfins usually group together in schools of up to fifteen dolphins. Unlike the Irrawaddy dolphins, Australian snubfins can be found traveling alone. Usually the average school of Australian snubfins consists of five dolphins. These groups of Australian snubfins are found along Australia's north coast from the Kimberley National Marine Park in Western Australia to the Gladstone region of Queensland and can be spotted in the waters of Papua New Guinea.

== Conservation ==
=== Irrawaddy dolphin ===
In 2008, the IUCN Red List changed its assessment of the Irrawaddy dolphin (Orcaella brevirostris) from data deficient to vulnerable. Currently, five out of the seven sub-populations of Irrawaddy dolphin are categorized as critically endangered. The species was given the status due to the low sizes of sub-populations, significant range declines, and threats to the species continue to be documented, unsustainable and severe.

==== Threats ====
Irrawaddy dolphins inhabit freshwater environments making them subject to anthropogenic threats. They include mortality from bycatch (specifically gillnets); habitat degradation caused by: dams, deforestation, and mining; contact with vessels; and capture for live aquarium display. Irrawaddy dolphin have also been hunted in the past in certain areas including the Mekong and Mahakam Rivers. Other potential threats include noise pollution in nearby cities and the possibility of mass pathogen induced mortalities.

==== Conservation ====
The action plan for the Conservation of Irrawaddy dolphins provides detail on strategies to alleviate the bycatch problem and considers that protection of certain areas of freshwater Irrawaddy dolphin populations can be an effective method of conservation.

=== Australian snubfin dolphin ===
After the species of Australian snubfin dolphin (Orcaella heinsohni) was declared a new species in 2005, the species was categorized as near threatened on the IUCN Red List in 2008. Although data of population structure and population trends is limited, the species was categorized as near threatened rather than data deficient. This is due to species' small population size (fewer than 10,000 mature individuals), limited range, low densities, and the species' vulnerability to bycatch. After more conclusive data is collected, a reassessment of the species has the potential to be categorized as either vulnerable or endangered.

==== Threats ====
Due to its occurrence in the close proximity to the Australian/New Guinean shore, the Australian snubfin dolphin is threatened by anthropogenic causes. A significant number of Australian snubfin dolphins are killed by anti-shark nets used to protect bathers and inshore gill-nets embedded across creeks and rivers. However, compared to the Irrawaddy dolphin, the Australian snubfin dolphins have fewer cases of habitat degradation.

==== Conservation actions ====
Regulations have been set in order to mitigate bycatch, however net attendance rules and gear modifications are hardly enforced.
