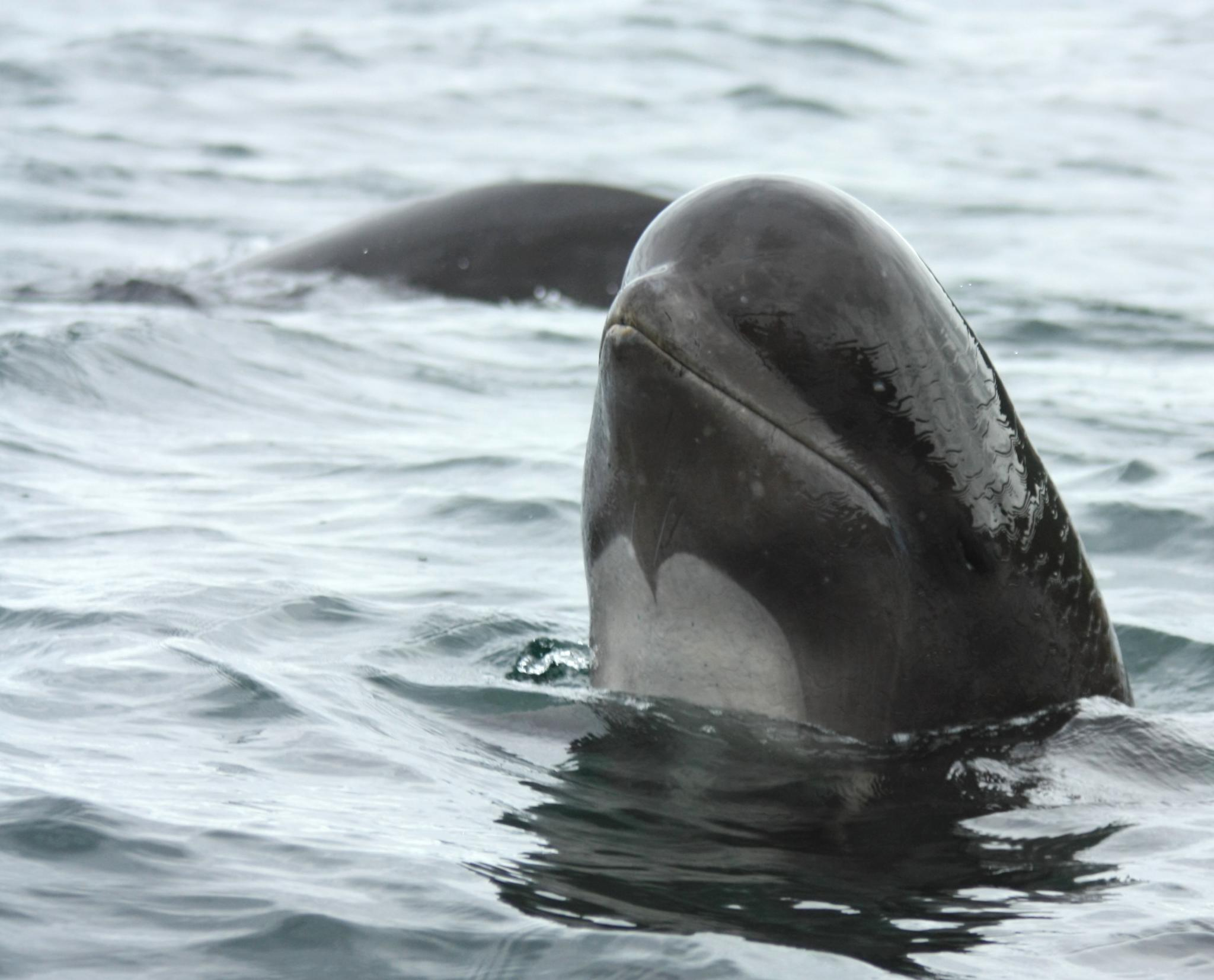
- Pilot whale spyhopping

Scientific classification
- Kingdom: Animalia
- Phylum: Chordata
- Class: Mammalia
- Order: Artiodactyla
- Infraorder: Cetacea
- Family: Delphinidae
- Subfamily: Globicephalinae; Le Duc, 1997

= Globicephalinae =

Subfamily of oceanic dolphins

Globicephalinae is a subfamily of oceanic dolphins that includes the pilot whales (Globicephala spp.), the pygmy killer whale (Feresa attenuata), the rough-toothed dolphin (Steno bredanensis), the false killer whale (Pseudorca crassidens), the melon-headed whale (Peponocephala electra), Risso's dolphin (Grampus griseus), and the snubfin dolphins (Orcaella spp.).

Delphinidae

- Delphinidae
  - - - Globicephalinae
        - Rough-toothed dolphin
        - - Snubfin dolphin
          - - Risso's dolphin
            - - - - False killer whale
                  - - Pilot whale
                    - Melon-headed whale
                - Pygmy killer whale
    - Delphininae
  - other dolphins

Relations within Globicephalinae
