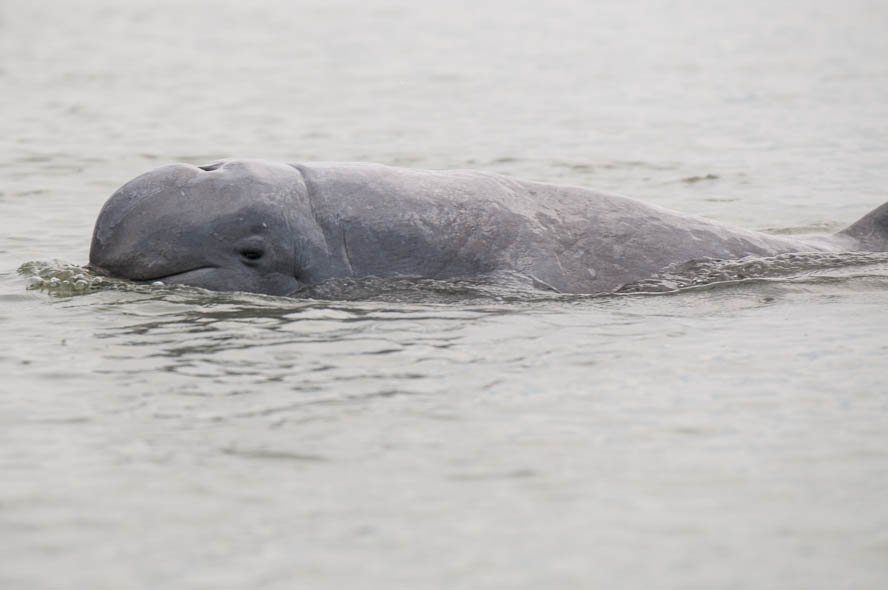
- Irrawaddy dolphin in Cambodia
- Size comparison with an average human

Conservation status
- Endangered (IUCN 3.1)
- CITES Appendix I

Scientific classification
- Kingdom: Animalia
- Phylum: Chordata
- Class: Mammalia
- Order: Artiodactyla
- Infraorder: Cetacea
- Family: Delphinidae
- Genus: Orcaella
- Species: O. brevirostris

Binomial name
- Orcaella brevirostris (Owen in Gray, 1866)
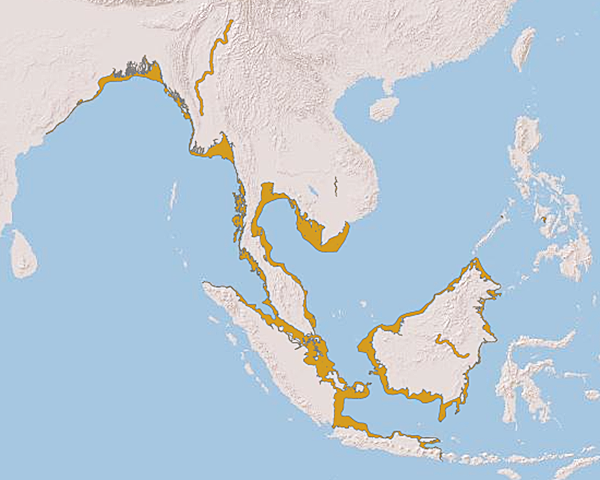
- Irrawaddy dolphin range in 2017

Synonyms
- List: Orca (Orcaella) brevirostris Owen in Gray, 1866 (basionym); Orcaella brevirostris brevirostris Ellerman & Morrison-Scott, 1951; Orcaella brevirostris fluminalis Ellerman & Morrison-Scott, 1951; Orcaella fluminalis Gray, 1871; Orcella brevirostris Anderson, 1871; Orcella fluminalis Anderson, 1871; Phocaena (Orca) brevirostris Owen, 1866

= Irrawaddy dolphin =

Species of mammal

The Irrawaddy dolphin (Orcaella brevirostris) is a euryhaline species of oceanic dolphin found in scattered subpopulations near sea coasts and in estuaries and rivers in parts of the Bay of Bengal and Southeast Asia. It closely resembles the Australian snubfin dolphin (of the same genus, Orcaella), which was not described as a separate species until 2005. It has a slate blue to a slate gray color. Although found in much of the riverine and marine zones of South and Southeast Asia, the only concentrated lagoon populations are found in Chilika Lake in Odisha, India, and Songkhla Lake in southern Thailand.

== Taxonomy ==
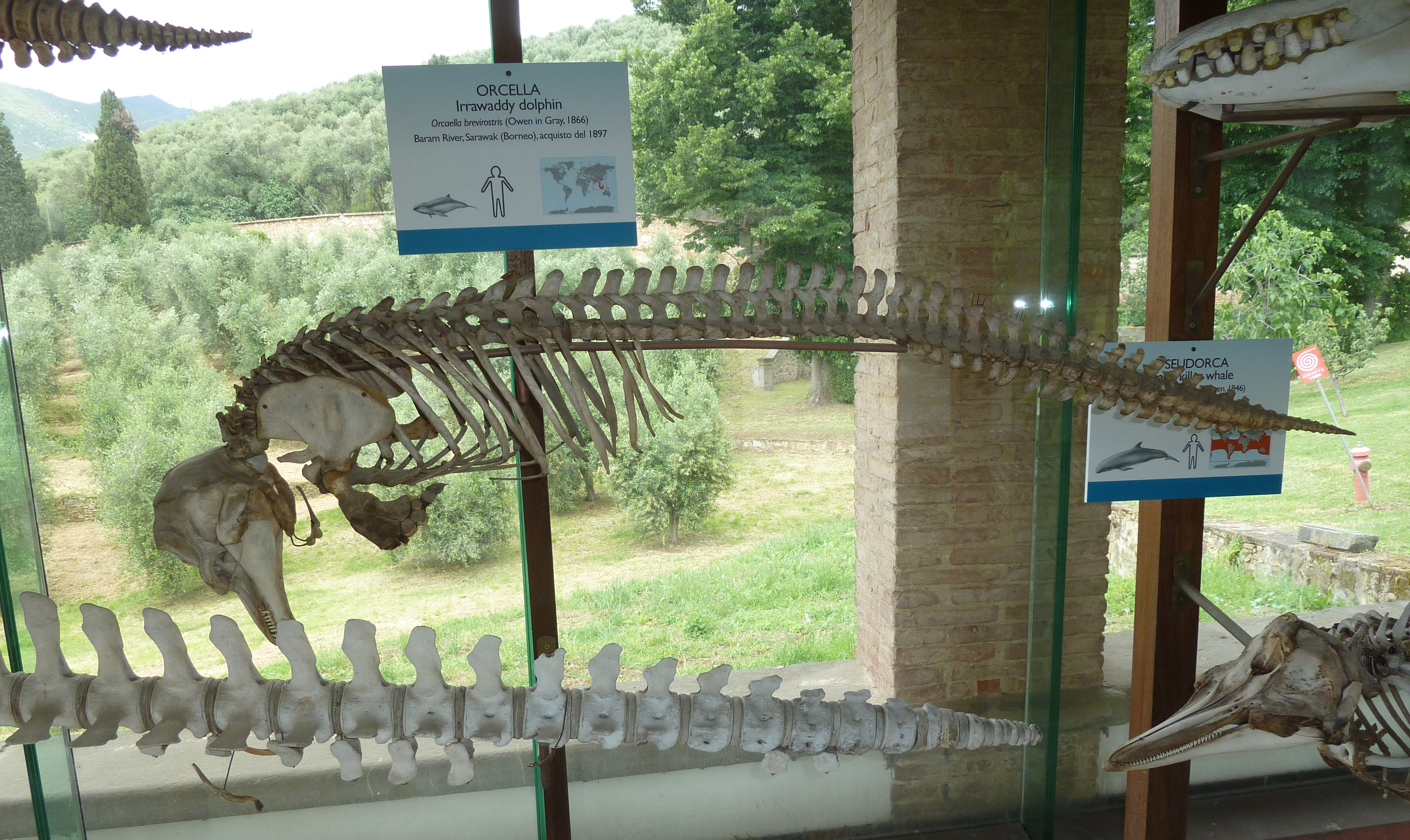
Irrawaddy dolphin skeleton specimen exhibited in Museo di storia naturale e del territorio dell'Università di Pisa

One of the earliest recorded descriptions of the Irrawaddy dolphin was by Sir Richard Owen in 1866, based on a specimen found in 1852 in the harbour of Visakhapatnam on the east coast of India. It is one of two species in its genus. It has sometimes been listed variously in a family containing just itself and in the Monodontidae and Delphinidae. Widespread agreement now exists to list it in the family Delphinidae.

== Etymology ==
The species' name, brevirostris, is from the Latin meaning "short beaked".

== Description ==
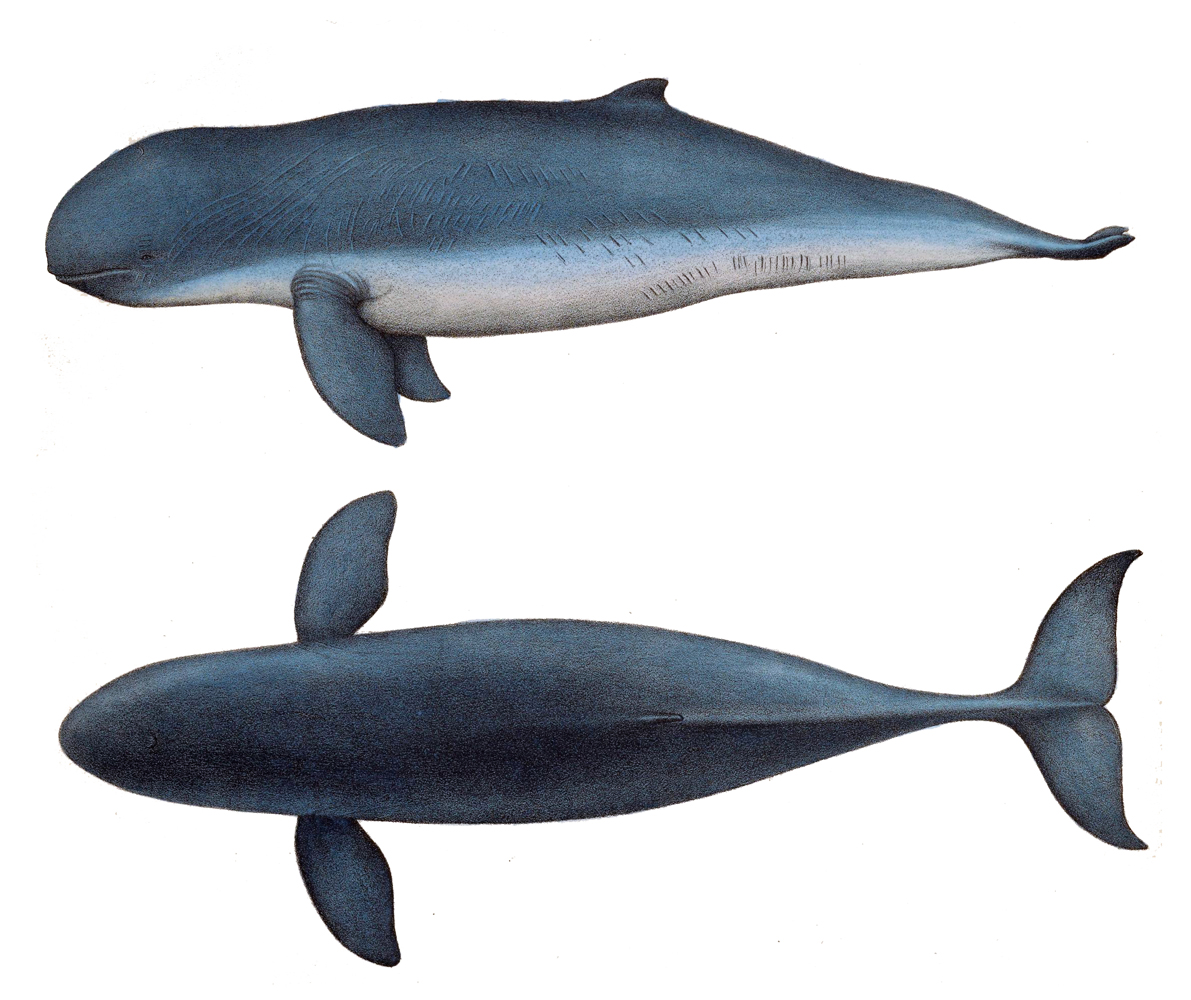
1878 illustration

The Irrawaddy dolphin's colour is grey to dark slate blue, paler underneath, without a distinctive pattern. The dorsal fin is small and rounded behind the middle of the back. The forehead is high and rounded; the beak is lacking. The front of its snout is blunt. The flippers are broad and rounded. The finless porpoise (Neophocaena phocaenoides) is similar and has no back fin; the humpback dolphin (Sousa chinensis) is larger and has a longer beak and a larger dorsal fin. It ranges in weight from 90 to 200 kg (200 to 440 lb) with a length of 2.3 m (7.5 ft) at full maturity. The maximum recorded length is 2.75 m (9.0 ft) of a male in Thailand.

The Irrawaddy dolphin is similar to the beluga in appearance, though most closely related to the killer whale. It has a large melon and a blunt, rounded head, and the beak is indistinct. Its dorsal fin, located about two-thirds posterior along the back, is short, blunt, and triangular. Dorsal fin shapes differ from one Irrawaddy dolphin to another. The flippers are long and broad. These dolphins are usually two-toned, with the back and sides being gray to bluish-gray and the belly lighter. Unlike any other dolphin, the Irrawaddy's U-shaped blowhole is on the left of the midline and opens towards the front of the dolphin. Its short beak appears very different from those of other dolphins, and its mouth is known for having 12-19 peg-like teeth on each side of the jaws.

== Behaviour ==
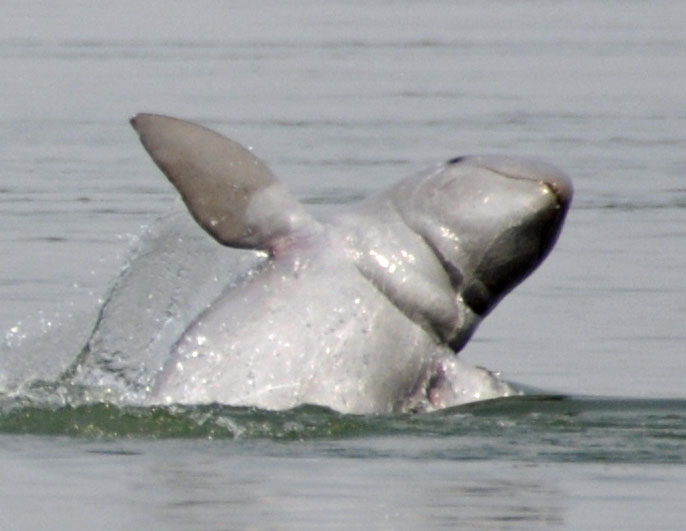
Closeup of an Irrawaddy dolphin jumping in the Mekong River

Communication is carried out with clicks, creaks, and buzzes at a dominant frequency of about 60 kilohertz, which is thought to be used for echolocation. Bony fish (including catfish) and fish eggs, cephalopods (such as squid, octopus, and cuttlefish), and crustaceans are taken as food. Observations of captive animals indicate food may be taken into the mouth by suction. Irrawaddy dolphins are capable of squirting streams of water that can reach up to 1.5 metres (4 ft 11 in); this distinct behaviour has been known for herding fish into a general area for hunting. They do this sometimes while spyhopping and during feeding, apparently to expel water ingested during fish capture or possibly to herd fish. Some Irrawaddy dolphins kept in captivity have been trained to do spyhopping on command. The Irrawaddy dolphin is a slow swimmer, but swimming speeds of 20–25 kilometres per hour (12–16 mph) were reported when dolphins were being chased in a boat. In a year, females can sometimes swim as far as an average of 45 kilometres (28 mi), and males can swim up to an average of 100 kilometres (62 mi).

Most Irrawaddy dolphins are shy of boats, not known to bow-ride, and generally dive when alarmed. They are relatively slow-moving but can sometimes be seen spyhopping and rolling to one side while waving a flipper and occasionally breaching. They are generally found in groups of 2-3 animals, though sometimes as many as 25 individuals have been known to congregate in deep pools. Groups of fewer than six individuals are most common, but sometimes up to 15 dolphins are seen together. Traveling and staying in groups not only enables Irrawaddy dolphins to hunt, but it also creates and maintains social bonds and allows copulation to occur. There are a few groups of dolphins in Brunei Bay seen near the mouths of the Temburong and Aloh Besar rivers, which are tame and gather around fishermen's boats that catch fish during the fishing season from around December to February.

It surfaces in a rolling fashion and lifts its tail fluke clear of the water only for a deep dive. Deep dive times range from 30 to 150 seconds to 12 minutes. When 277 group dives were timed (time of disappearance of the last dolphin in the group to the emergence of the first dolphin in the group) in Laos, the mean duration was 115.3 seconds with a range of 19 seconds to 7.18 minutes.

Interspecific competition has been observed when Irrawaddy dolphins were forced inshore and excluded by more specialized dolphins. When captive humpback dolphins (Sousa chinensis) and Irrawaddy dolphins were held together, reportedly the Irrawaddy dolphins were frequently chased and confined to a small portion of the tank by the dominant humpbacks. In Chilika Lake, local fishers say when Irrawaddy dolphins and bottlenose dolphins meet in the outer channel, the former get frightened and are forced to return toward the lake.

=== Mating ===
A female or male dolphin will attempt to pursue a mate for about a few minutes. They intertwine, facing their bellies together, and begin to copulate for 40 seconds. Once copulation has occurred, the dolphins will break away from each other and set off in different directions.

=== Reproduction ===
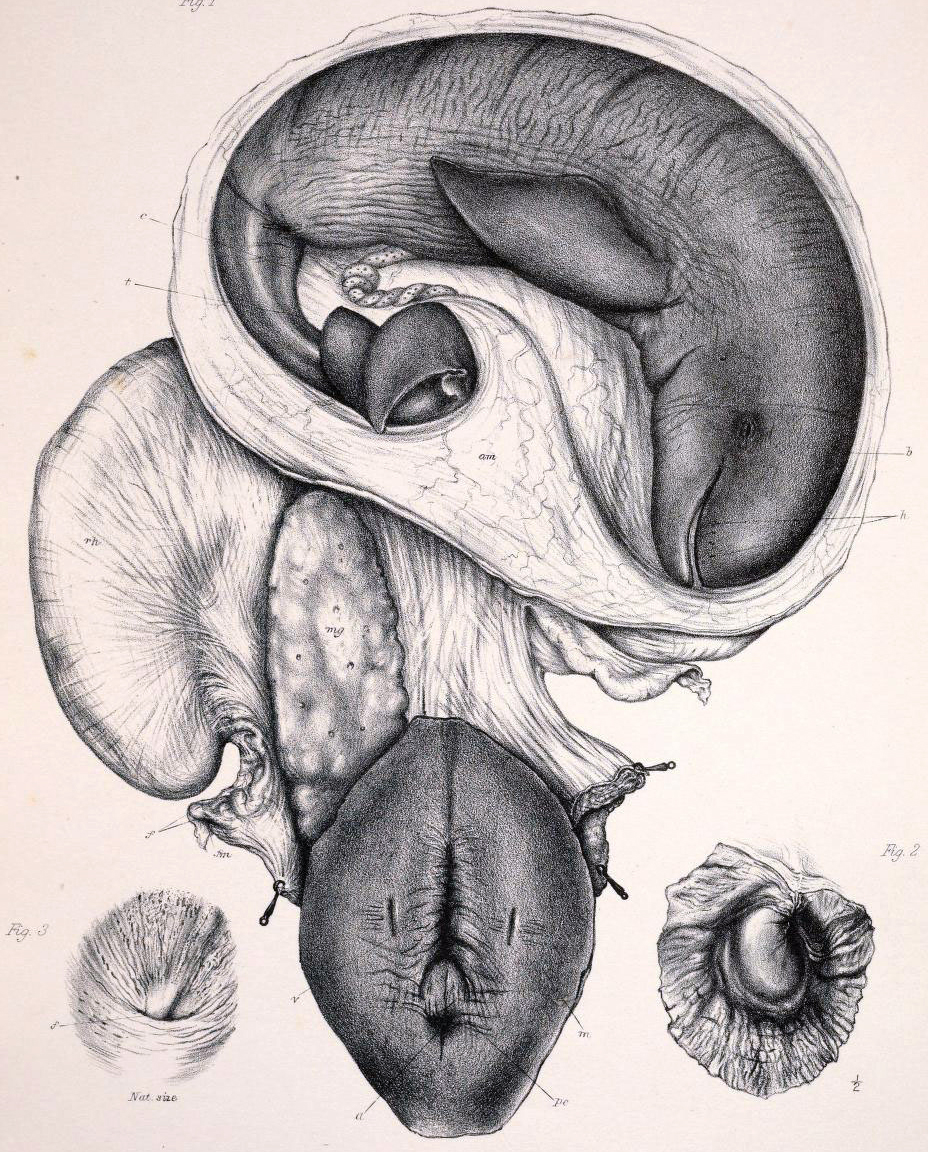
1878 illustration of a foetus in the uterus

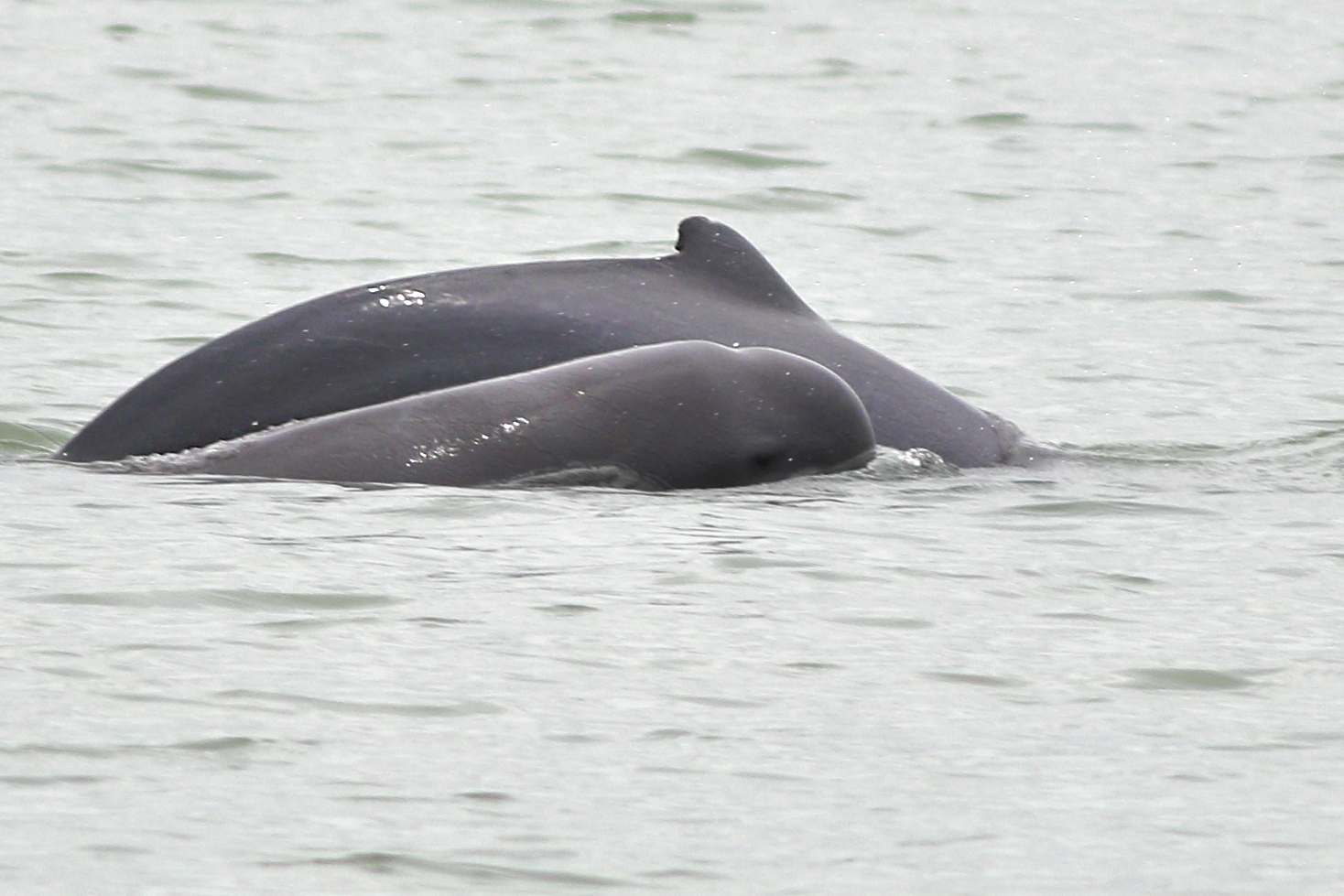
Mother with calf from Sundarban, Bangladesh

These dolphins are thought to reach sexual maturity at seven to nine years. In the Northern Hemisphere, mating is reported from December to June. Its gestation period is 14 months; cows give birth to a single calf every two to three years. Length is about 1 m (3.3 ft) at birth. Birth weight is about 10 kg (22 lb). Weaning is after two years. Lifespan is about 30 years.

=== Feeding ===
There are plenty of food items that this dolphin feeds upon. They include fish, crustaceans, and cephalopods. During foraging periods, herds of about 7 dolphins will circle around prey and trap their victim. These prey entrapments occur slightly below the water surface level.

== Distribution and habitat ==
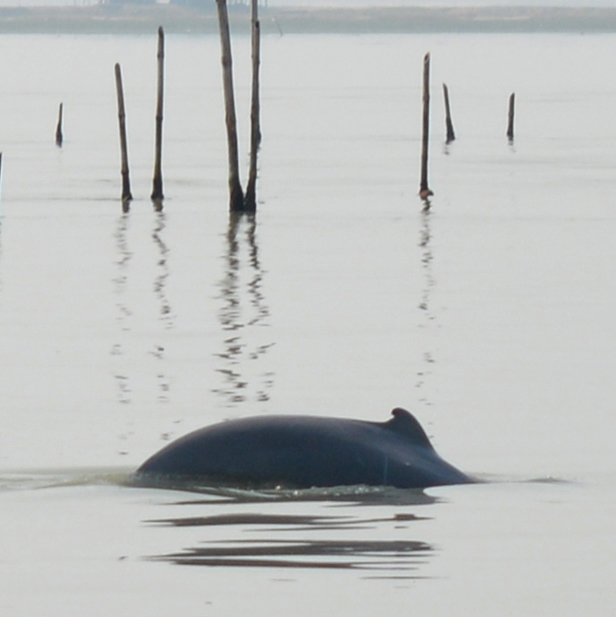
Irrawaddy Dolphin in Chilika Lake, Odisha

The Irrawaddy dolphin is an oceanic dolphin that lives in brackish water near coasts, river mouths, and estuaries. It has established subpopulations in freshwater rivers, including the Ganges and the Mekong, as well as the Ayeyarwady River, from which it takes its name. Its range extends from the Bay of Bengal to New Guinea and the Philippines, although it does not appear to venture offshore. It is often seen in estuaries and bays of Borneo, with sightings from Sandakan in Sabah to most parts of Brunei and Sarawak, and another specimen was collected at Mahakam River in East Kalimantan. Its presence in Chinese, Taiwanese, and Hong Kong waters has been questioned, as the reported sightings have been considered unreliable.

- Bangladesh: ~3,500 in coastal waters of the Bay of Bengal and 451 (VU) in the brackish Sundarbans mangrove forest
- India: 156 in the brackish-water Chilika Lake, Odisha, as of 2021.
- Cambodia: ~105 in a 190-km (118-mi) freshwater stretch of the Mekong River as of 2024
- Indonesia: ~70, in a 420-km (260-mi) stretch of the freshwater Mahakam River
- Philippines: ~35 in the brackish inner Malampaya Sound, Palawan, at least 20 in Quezon in southern Palawan, 30–40 in the waters of Pulupandan, Bago, Negros Occidental, Guimaras and Iloilo in the Western Visayas Region and Negros Island Region, and at least two in San Miguel Bay, Bicol, the easternmost population and the only population in the Pacific Ocean.
- Myanmar: ~58-72 in a 370-km (230-mi) freshwater stretch of the Ayeyarwady River
- Thailand: less than 50 in the brackish Songkhla Lake, perhaps just 14.

It has been extinct in Laos since 2022.

== Interaction with humans ==
Irrawaddy dolphins have a mutualistic relationship of co-operative fishing with traditional fishers. Fishers in India recall when they would call out to the dolphins by tapping a wooden key, also known as a lahai kway, against the sides of their boats, asking the Irrawaddys to drive fish into their nets. In Burma, in the upper reaches of the Ayeyarwady River, Irrawaddy dolphins drive fish towards fishers using cast nets in response to acoustic signals from them. The fishermen attempt to gain the attention of the dolphins through various efforts such as using a cone-shaped wooden stick to drum the side of their canoes, striking their paddles to the surface of the water, jingling their nets, or making calls that sound turkey-like. A pod of dolphins that agrees to work alongside the fisherman will entrap a school of fish in a semicircle, guiding them towards the boat. In return, the dolphins are rewarded with some of the fishers' bycatch. Historically, Irrawaddy River fishers claimed particular dolphins were associated with individual fishing villages and chased fish into their nets. An 1879 report indicated legal claims were frequently brought into native courts by fishers to recover a share of the fish from the nets of a rival fisher that the plaintiff's dolphin was claimed to have helped fill.

=== Folk stories ===
Laotians and Cambodians have a common belief that the Irrawaddy dolphins are reincarnations of their ancestors. Some even claim that the dolphins have saved drowning villagers and protected people from attacks by crocodiles. Their beliefs and experiences have led the people of Laos and Cambodia to live peacefully alongside one another for ages. The West Kalimantan people have a similar story where the dolphins were naughty children who ate a pot of rice reserved for the shaman, but their mouths scalded, and they jumped into the water to cool themselves, and later transformed into these dolphins.

Buddhist Khmer and Vietnamese fishermen have regarded the Orcaella as a sacred animal. If caught in fishing nets, they release the dolphin from the rest of the catch. In contrast, Muslim Khmer fishermen kill them for food. This has led to the dolphin becoming reputed to recognize the local languages of the area and approaching areas of the Khmer Muslim community with caution.

== Threats ==
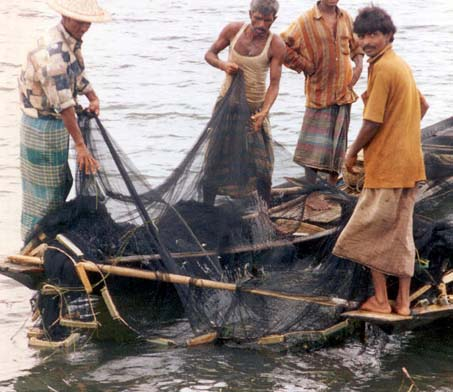
Fishermen with fishnets in Bangladesh

Irrawaddy dolphins are more susceptible to human conflict than most other dolphins that live farther out in the ocean. Drowning in gillnets is the main threat to them throughout their range. Between 1995 and 2001, 38 deaths were reported, and 74% died as a result of entanglement in gillnets with large mesh sizes. The majority of reported dolphin deaths in all subpopulations are due to accidental capture and drowning in gillnets and dragnets, and in the Philippines, bottom-set crab nets. In Burma, electrofishing, gold mining, and dam building are also serious and continuing threats. Though most fishers are sympathetic to the dolphins' plight, abandoning their traditional livelihood is difficult for them.

Another identified threat towards the Irrawaddy dolphins was noise pollution from high-speed vessels. This caused the dolphins to dive significantly longer than usual. The Irrawaddy dolphins always changed directions when they encountered these large vessels.

In recent years, Laotians and Cambodians developed techniques of using explosives for fishing. The government of Laos has made the use of such tactics illegal, but few regulations have been made in neighboring Cambodia, where explosives are sold in local markets and the practice of using fishnets has been abandoned. The practice of using explosives instead has become very popular and led to a steady decline of populations of fish, and especially the dolphins swimming in the area. Although Laotians may not use explosives, they do use nylon gillnets, which pose another large threat to the survival of the Irrawaddy. Some dolphins accidentally become entangled in the net. Poor fishermen refuse to cut and destroy their nets because it would result in too great an economic loss to save one Irrawaddy dolphin.

In Laos, a dam across the Mekong River is planned. This could threaten the existence of the endangered Irrawaddy dolphins in downstream Cambodia. Laos's government decision is to forge the dam upstream of the core habitat of the Irrawaddy dolphins. This could precipitate the extinction of this specific species in the Mekong River. The dam builders propose to use explosives to dig out the tons of rock. This will create strong sound waves that could kill the Irrawaddy dolphins due to their highly sensitive hearing structures.

In several Asian countries, Irrawaddy dolphins have been captured and trained to perform in public aquaria. Their charismatic appearance and unique behaviors, including spitting water, spyhopping, and fluke-slapping, make them very popular for shows in dolphinariums. The commercial motivation for using this dolphin species is high because it can live in freshwater tanks, and the high cost of marine aquarium systems is avoided. The region within and near the species' range has developed economically; theme parks, casinos, and other entertainment venues that include dolphin shows have increased.

In 2002, there were more than 80 dolphinariums in at least nine Asian countries.

Collateral deaths of dolphins due to blast fishing were once common in Vietnam and Thailand. In the past, the most direct threat was killing them for their oil.

The IUCN lists five of the seven subpopulations as endangered, primarily due to drowning in fish nets. For example, the Malampaya population, first discovered and described in 1986, at the time consisted of 77 individuals. Due to anthropogenic activities, this number dwindled to 47 dolphins in 2007, which further dwindled to 35 by 2013. In the Mahakam River in Borneo, 73% of dolphin deaths are related to entanglement in gillnets, due to heavy fishing and boat traffic.

=== Tourism ===
The Irrawaddy dolphins in Asia are increasingly threatened by tourist activity, such as large numbers of boats circulating the areas in which they live. The development of tours and boats has put a large strain on the dolphins.

=== Disease ===
Cutaneous nodules were found to be present in various vulnerable populations of Irrawaddy dolphins. A more precise estimate of the affected dolphins is six populations. Although the definite fate of this emergent disease is unknown, the species is at risk.

== Conservation ==
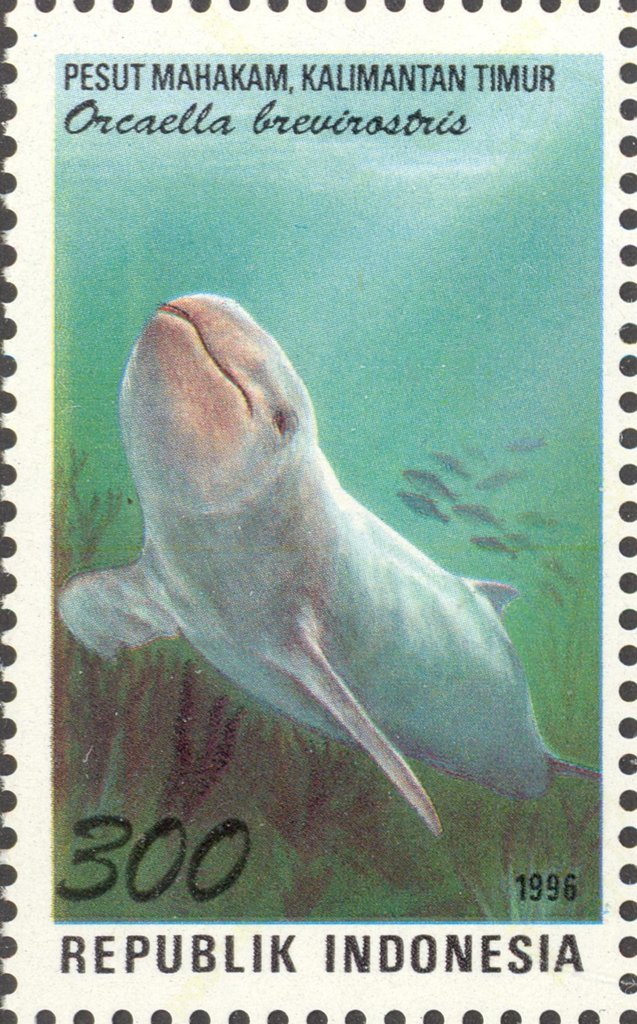
Irrawaddy dolphin on a 1996 Indonesian stamp

The Irrawaddy dolphin's proximity to developing communities makes the effort for conservation difficult. Entanglement in fishnets and degradation of habitats are the main threats to Irrawaddy dolphins. Conservation efforts are being made at international and national levels to alleviate these threats.

=== International efforts ===
Protection from international trade is provided by the Convention on International Trade in Endangered Species of Wild Fauna and Flora (CITES). Enforcement, though, is the responsibility of individual countries. While some international trade for dolphinarium animals may have occurred, this is unlikely to have ever been a major threat to the species.

Some Irrawaddy dolphin populations are classified by the IUCN as critically endangered in Cambodia, Vietnam (Mekong River sub-population), Indonesia (Mahakam River sub-population, Borneo), Myanmar (Ayeyarwady/Irrawaddy River sub-population), the Philippines (Malampaya Sound sub-population), and Thailand (Songkhla Lake sub-population). Irrawaddy dolphins in general, however, are IUCN listed as an endangered species, which applies throughout their whole range. In 2004, CITES transferred the Irrawaddy dolphin from Appendix II to Appendix I, which forbids all commercial trade in species that are threatened with extinction.

The UNEP-CMS Action Plan for the Conservation of Freshwater Populations of Irrawaddy dolphins notes that multiple-use protected areas will play a key role in conserving freshwater populations. Protected areas in fresh water could be a particularly effective conservation tool and can facilitate management, due to the fidelity of the species to relatively circumscribed areas. The Action Plan provides details on strategies for mitigating by-catch, including:

-establishing core conservation areas where gillnetting is banned or severely restricted
-promoting net attendance rules and providing training on the safe release of entangled dolphins
-initiating programs to compensate fishers for damage caused to their nets by entangled dolphins that are safely released
-providing alternative or diversified employment options for gillnet fishers
-encouraging the use of fishing gear that does not harm dolphins, by altering or establishing fee structures for fishing permits to make gillnetting more expensive while decreasing the fees for nondestructive gear
-experimenting with acoustical deterrents and reflective nets.

The Irrawaddy dolphin is listed on both Appendix I and Appendix II of the Convention on the Conservation of Migratory Species of Wild Animals (CMS). It is listed on Appendix I as this species has been categorized as being in danger of extinction throughout all or a significant proportion of their range, and CMS Parties strive towards strictly protecting these animals, conserving or restoring the places where they live, mitigating obstacles to migration, and controlling other factors that might endanger them, as well as on Appendix II as it has an unfavourable conservation status or would benefit significantly from international co-operation organized by tailored agreements.

The species is also covered by the Memorandum of Understanding for the Conservation of Cetaceans and Their Habitats in the Pacific Islands Region (MoU).

=== National efforts ===
Several national efforts are resulting in the reduction of threats to local Irrawaddy dolphin subpopulations:

==== Bangladesh ====
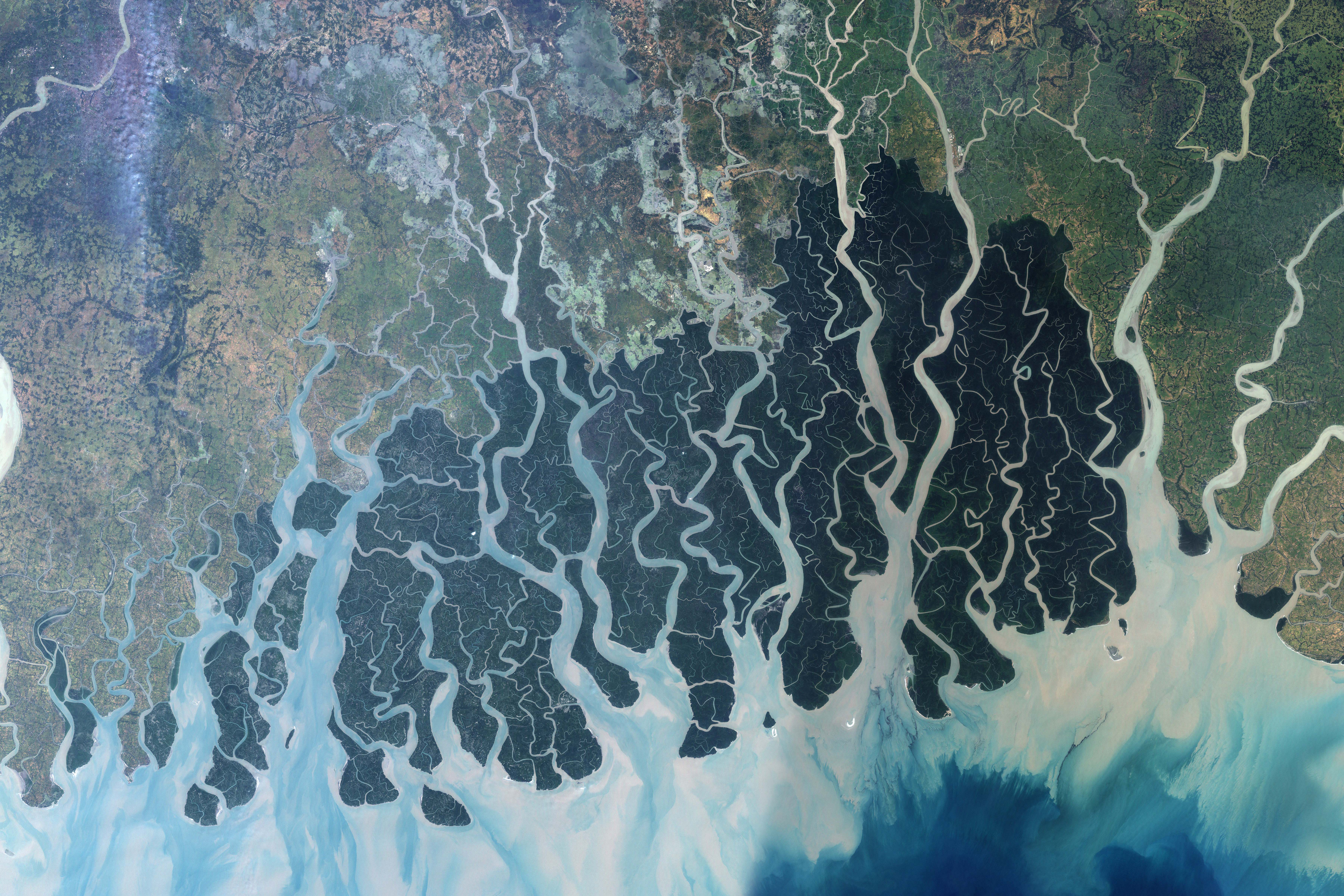
Satellite image of the Sundarbans

Portions of Irrawaddy dolphin habitat in the Sundarbans mangrove forest of Bangladesh are included within 139,700 ha (539 sq mi) of three wildlife sanctuaries, which are part of the Sunderbans World Heritage Site. The Wildlife Conservation Society is working with the Bangladesh Ministry of Environment and Forests to create protected areas for the 6000 remaining dolphins.

==== Cambodia ====
Irrawaddy dolphins are fully protected as an endangered species under Cambodian fishery law. In 2005, the World Wide Fund for Nature (WWF) established the Cambodian Mekong Dolphin Conservation Project with support from government and local communities. The aim is to support the survival of the remaining population through targeted conservation activities, research, and education. In January 2012, the Cambodian Fisheries Administration, the Commission for Conservation and Development of Mekong River Dolphin Eco-tourism Zone, and WWF signed the Kratie Declaration on the Conservation of the Mekong River Irrawaddy Dolphin, an agreement binding them to work together, and setting out a roadmap for dolphin conservation in the Mekong River. On 24 August 2012, the Cambodian government announced that a 180-kilometre-long (110 mi) stretch of the Mekong River from eastern Kratie province to the border with Laos has been designated as a limited fishing zone where using floating houses, fishing cages, and gill nets is disallowed, but simple fishing is allowed. This area is patrolled by a network of river guards, specifically to protect dolphins. Between January and February 2006, a dozen Irrawaddy dolphins were found dead. Since the endangerment was evident, 66 guards have been posted along the Mekong River in Cambodia to protect these dolphins.

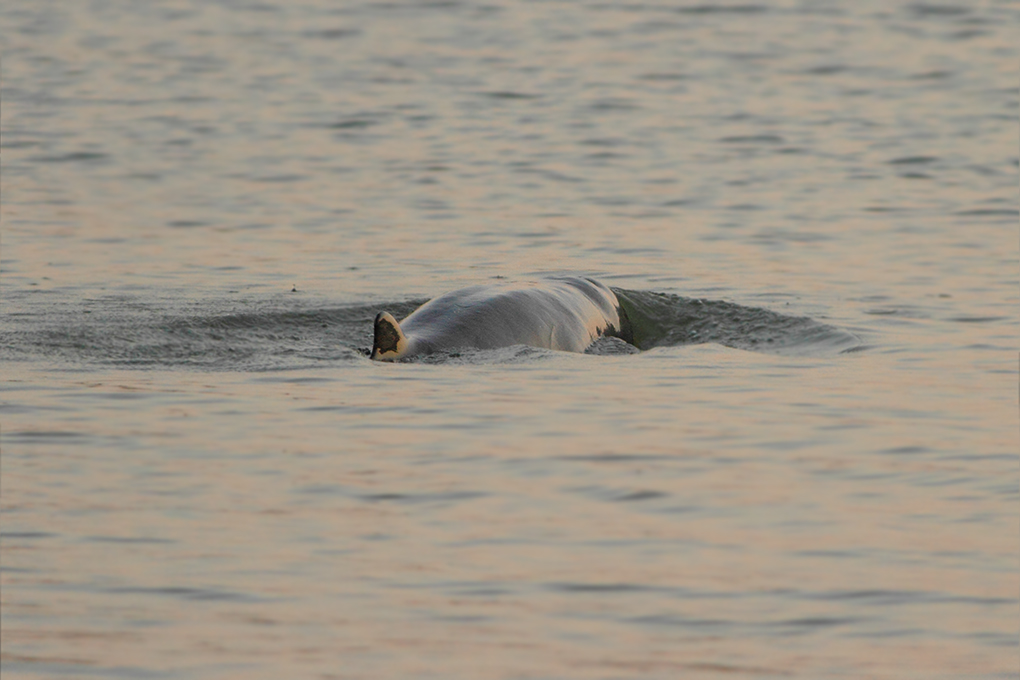
Irrawaddy dolphin in the Sundarbans

==== India ====
The Irrawaddy dolphin (under the common name of snubfin dolphin, with the scientific name misspelled as Oreaella brevezastris) is included in the Indian Wildlife Protection Act, Schedule I, which bans their killing, transport, and sale of products. A major restoration effort to open a new mouth between Chilika Lake and the Bay of Bengal in 2000 was successful in restoring the lake ecology and regulating the salinity gradient in the lake waters, which has resulted in increases in the population of Irrawaddy dolphins due to an increase of prey species of fish, prawns, and crabs.

==== Indonesia ====
A conservation program, entitled Conservation Foundation for the Protection of Rare Aquatic Species of Indonesia, focused on protecting the Irrawaddy dolphin population and their habitat, the Mahakam River. The program not only educates and surveys the public, but also controls and monitors the dolphin population and their habitat. A prime example of this is the establishment of patrols in several villages.

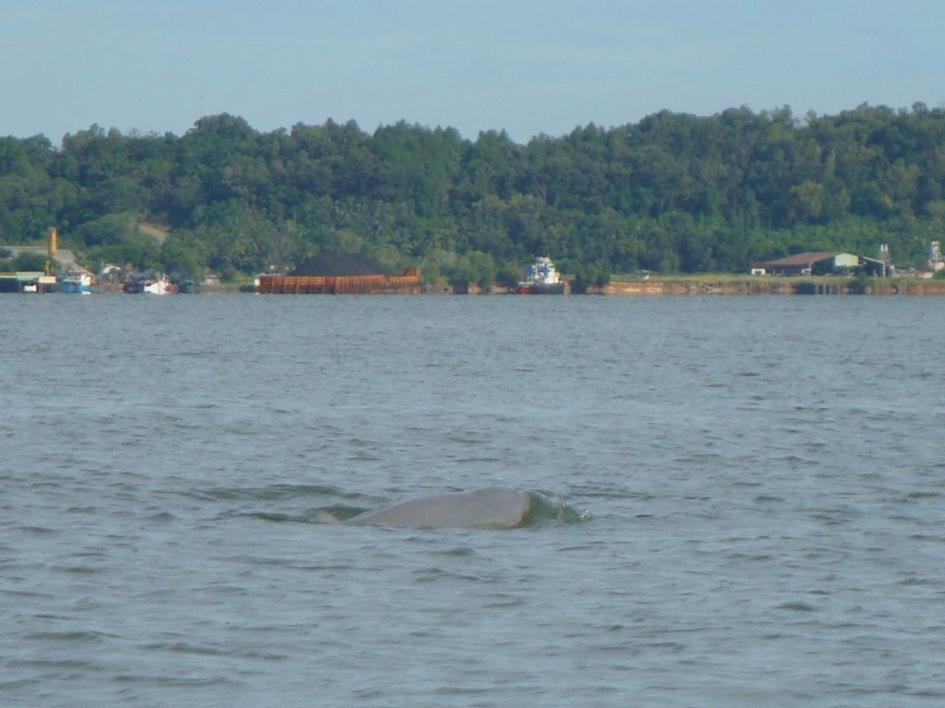
Specimen in Kalimantan

==== Laos ====
The dolphins have been extinct in Laos since 2022. In the 1970s, many Irrawaddy dolphins were slaughtered for oil, and soon after, intensive fishing practices with explosives and gillnets began. The dolphins were protected in Cambodia and Laos, and explosive fishing and use of gillnets were restricted in many of the Irrawaddy dolphins' habitats. Canadian conservationist Ian Baird set up the Lao Community Fisheries and Dolphin Protection Project to study the Irrawaddy dolphins in the Laotian part of the Mekong. Part of this project compensated fishers for the loss of nets damaged to free entangled dolphins. This project was expanded to include Cambodia after the majority of the dolphin population was determined to have been killed or migrated to Cambodia. The Si Phan Don Wetlands Project encouraged river communities to set aside conservation zones and establish laws to regulate how and when fish are caught.

Ultimately, these measures were unsuccessful. In early 2022, a 110 kg 25-year-old male dolphin was found dead on an island in the Si Phan Don called Koh La Ngo. It measured 2.6m in length and was the last Irrawaddy dolphin in Laos.

==== Myanmar ====
Myanmar's Department of Fisheries took charge in December 2005 and instituted a protected region in a 74 km (46 mi) segment of the Ayeyarwady River between Mingun and Kyaukmyaung. Protective measures in the area include mandatory release of entangled dolphins, prohibition of the catching or killing of dolphins and trade in whole or parts of them, and the prohibition of electrofishing and gillnets more than 91 metres (300 ft) long, or spaced less than 180 metres (600 ft) apart. Mercury poisoning and habitat loss from gold-mining dredging operations in the river have been eliminated.

==== Philippines ====
In 2000, Malampaya Sound was proclaimed a protected seascape. This is the lowest possible prioritization given to a protected area. The Malampaya Sound Ecological Studies Project was initiated by the WWF. With technical support provided by the project, the municipality of Taytay and the Malampaya park management developed fishery policies to minimize the threats to the Irrawaddy dolphin from bycatch capture. Gear studies and gear modification to conserve the dolphin species were implemented. The project was completed in 2007. In 2007, the Coral Triangle Initiative, a new multilateral partnership to help safeguard the marine and coastal resources of the Coral Triangle, including the Irrawaddy dolphin subpopulation in Malampaya Sound, was launched. In 2006, a new population was discovered in Guimaras Island in the Visayas. In 2015, another new population was discovered in Bago and Pulupandan in Negros Occidental, part of Negros island in the Visayas. The dolphins are locally known in the Visayas as lumba-lumba.

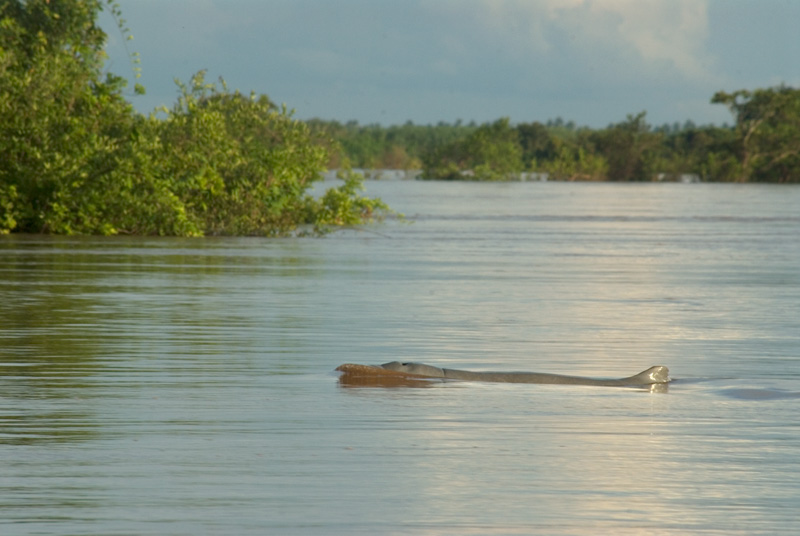
Irrawaddy dolphin on Mekong River at Kratié, Cambodia

==== Thailand ====
In 2002, the Marine and Coastal Resources Department was assigned to protect rare aquatic animals such as dolphins, whales, and turtles in Thai territorial waters. To protect the dolphins, patrol vessels ensure boats stay at least 30 m (98 ft) away from dolphins and no chasing of or running through schools of dolphins occurs. Many fishermen on the Bang Pakong River, Prachinburi Province, have been persuaded by authorities to stop shrimp fishing in a certain area, and 30 to 40 fishing boats have been modified so they can offer dolphin sightseeing tours. A total of 65 Irrawaddy dolphins have been found dead along the coast of Trat Province in the past three years. The local fishing industry is blamed for the deaths of the dolphins. In January 2013, over a dozen dead Irrawaddy dolphins were found on the coast of Thailand. These dolphins were said to be dead because of a lack of oxygen. Dolphins are mammals, and unlike other animals that live in the sea, they must come to the surface for air. Many of the dolphins are found dead in the water, and others were washed ashore, said to have been dead for a few days. Also, in the first week of February 2013, as many as four Irrawaddy dolphins were found dead. The Natural Resources and Environment Ministry is studying artificial breeding options in 2022 to try to save the last herd of Irrawaddy dolphins in Songkhla Lake, which is on the verge of extinction after only 14 were found in the most recent survey. They also intend to list dolphins as a protected species, Thailand's highest level of animal protection.

==== Malaysia ====
In 2008, the Department of Forestry and Sarawak Forestry Cooperative in Sarawak established a protected area for Irrawaddy dolphins in Santubong and Damai (Kuching Wetland). Furthermore, they plan to establish more beaches in Miri as protected areas for them. The protection measures in the area include prohibition of catching or killing dolphins and trade in whole or parts of them, and prohibiting the use of gillnets. The government may also start small- and medium-scale research of this species at Sarawak Malaysia University with sponsorship from Sarawak Shell.

==== Vietnam ====
In 2012 in Vietnam, a group of scientists took in four Irrawaddy dolphins and provided them with medical care to see how they would survive. However, they found this to be the first case they saw of Irrawaddy dolphins having bacterial infections. The bacterial infection, chorioamnionitis, is common in many marine animals, but when these few dolphins were taken in, the scientists discovered this same bacterial infection for the first time in this group of dolphins. This disease mostly affects animals that are pregnant because the infection occurs through the umbilical cord and goes into the maternal bloodstream. One of the dolphins was pregnant, and before her death, she was found circling the bottom of the pool and was found dead early the next morning. This bacterial infection affects many organs in the body of the animal.

== See also ==
- List of cetaceans
- Marine biology
- Environmental issues in Indonesia
- South Asian river dolphin

== Bibliography ==
- Encyclopedia of Marine Mammals, ISBN 0-12-551340-2.
- National Audubon Society Guide to Marine Mammals of the World, ISBN 0-375-41141-0.
- Whales, Dolphins and Porpoises, Mark Carwardine, ISBN 0-7513-2781-6.
