= Notoziphius =

Notoziphius Temporal range: Late Miocene

Scientific classification
- Kingdom: Animalia
- Phylum: Chordata
- Class: Mammalia
- Order: Artiodactyla
- Infraorder: Cetacea
- Family: Ziphiidae
- Genus: †Notoziphius; Buono & Cozzuol, 2013
- Species: †N. bruneti

Binomial name
- †Notoziphius bruneti Buono & Cozzuol, 2013

Extinct genus of mammals

Notoziphius is an extinct genus of beaked whale from the Late Miocene of Patagonia, Argentina. The type and only species is N. bruneti, which was named in 2013 by Mónica Buono and Mario Cozzuol based on a well-preserved skull and partial dentaries.

== Classification ==
In phylogenetic analyses, Notoziphius is usually recovered as part of or close to a basal ziphiid clade that also includes genera like Messapicetus, Aporotus and Beneziphius. In their description of the type material, Buono and Cozzuol recovered Notoziphius in a polytomy with the three aforementioned genera and Ziphirostrum. In their analysis, this group represents the earliest branch of Ziphiidae, and thus the most basal. The clade was given the name Messapicetiformes in a 2024 study by Bianucci and colleagues, and their analysis also yielded a more well-resolved phylogenetic tree. Here, Ninoziphius is the most basal member of Ziphiidae, followed by Notoziphius and the Messapicetiformes. When compared to the composition seen in the paper by Buono and Cozzuol, Notoziphius lands on the same branch as, but just outside of the clade. Both resulting trees for Ziphiidae are reproduced below, with the 2013 tree at left and the 2024 tree at right.

Buono & Cozzuol (2013)

- - Ziphiidae
    - - †Aporotus
      - †Notoziphius
      - †Messapicetus
      - †Ziphirostrum
      - †Beneziphius
    - - †Ninoziphius
      - - Tasmacetus
        - - Nazcacetus
          - - Berardiinae
            - Ziphiinae
            - - Nenga
              - - †Xhosacetus
                - - †Khoikhoicetus
                  - - †Pterocetus
                    - - Hyperoodontinae

Bianucci et al. (2024)

- - Ziphiidae
    - †Ninoziphius
    - - †Notoziphius
      - †Messapicetiformes
        - †Chimuziphius
        - - - †Messapicetus longirostris
            - - †Dagonodum
              - †Messapicetus gregarius
          - - †Ziphirostrum
            - - †Aporotus
              - - †Beneziphius cetariensis
                - - †Beneziphius brevirostris
                  - - - †Imocetus
                      - - †Globicetus
                        - †Tusciziphius atlanticus
                        - †Tusciziphius crispus
                    - - †Choneziphius
