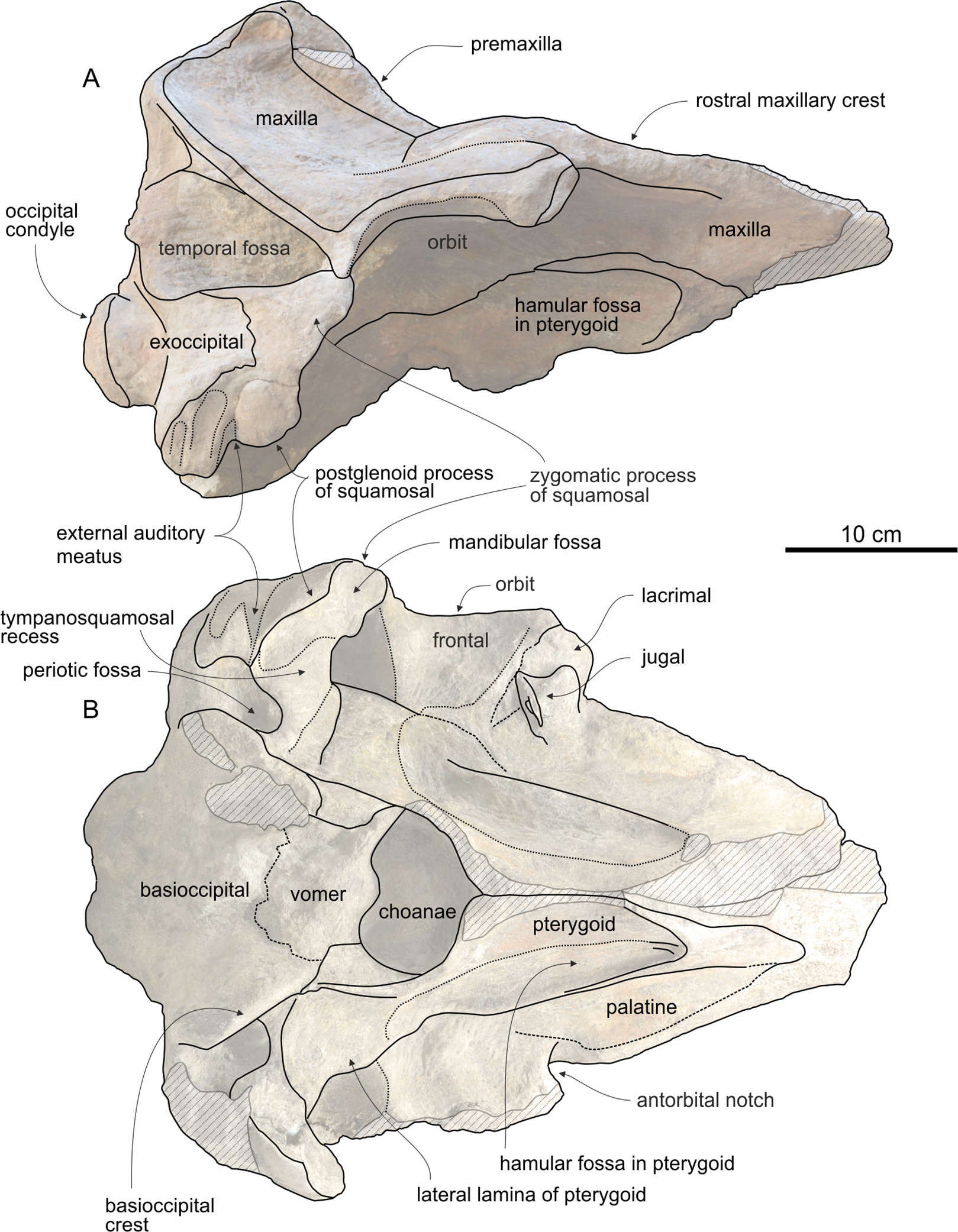
- Holotype cranium

Scientific classification
- Kingdom: Animalia
- Phylum: Chordata
- Class: Mammalia
- Infraclass: Placentalia
- Order: Artiodactyla
- Infraorder: Cetacea
- Family: Ziphiidae
- Genus: †Chavinziphius; Bianucci et al., 2016
- Species: †C. maxillocristatus

Binomial name
- †Chavinziphius maxillocristatus Bianucci et al., 2016

= Chavinziphius =

Chavinziphius Temporal range: Late Miocene (Messinian), ~6.93–6.71 Ma

Extinct genus of cetaceans

Chavinziphius is an extinct genus of beaked whale (family Ziphiidae) known from Messinian age marine deposits of the Pisco Formation in Peru. The type and only species is Chavinziphius maxillocristatus.

== Discovery and naming ==
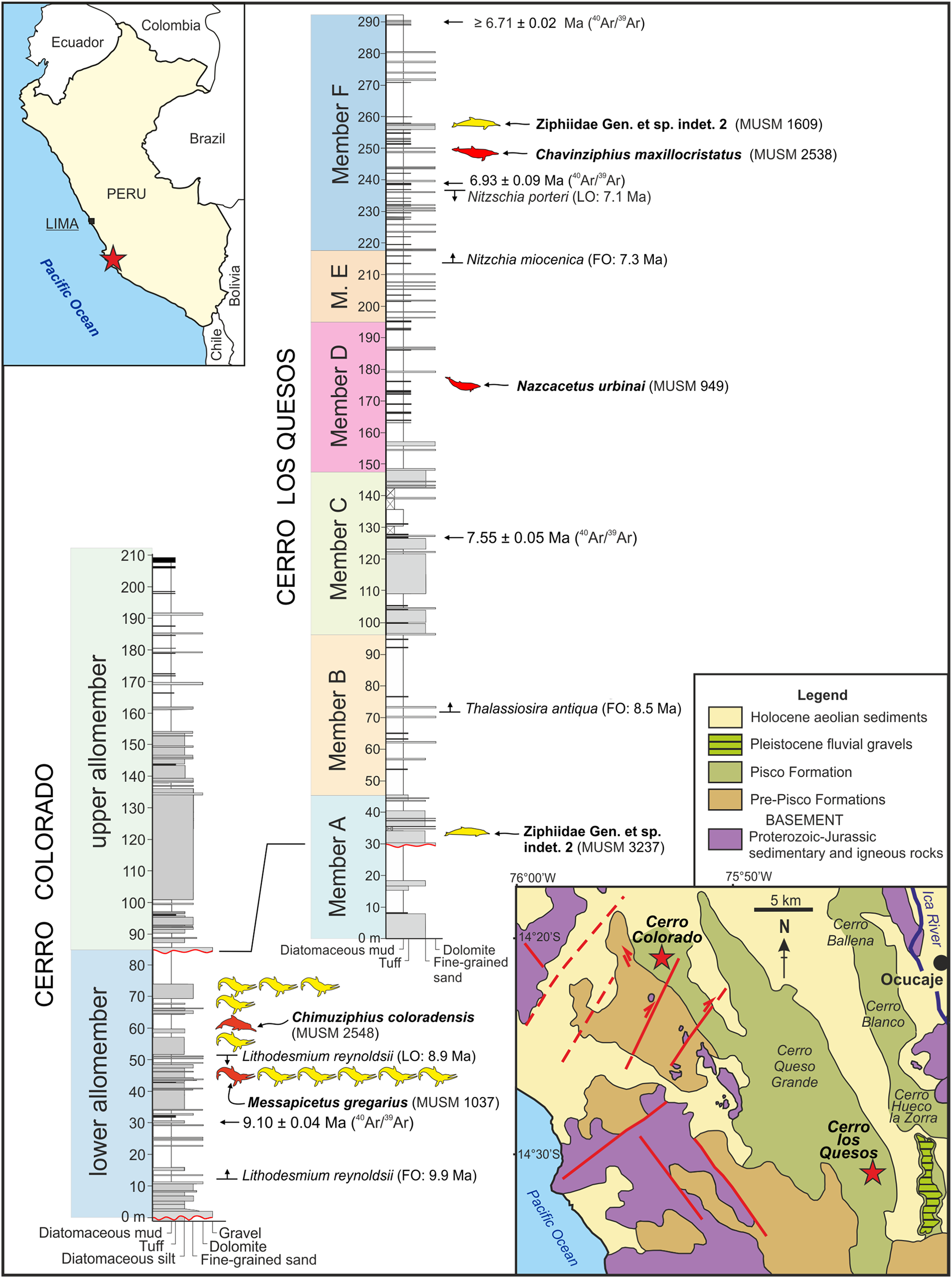
Type locality (Cerro Los Quesos)

The only known fossils of Chavinziphius were discovered in the Cerro Los Quesos locality of the Pisco Formation in the Pisco-Ica Desert of Peru between 2014 and 2016. The only fossil of Chavinziphius are a partial cranium (MUSM 2538), which is lacking much of the rostrum, ear bones , teeth, left mandible, and the anterior of the symphyseal region of the right mandible.

In 2016, Giovanni Bianucci and colleagues described Chavinziphius maxillocristatus as a new genus and species of ziphiid whale, establishing MUSM 2538 as the holotype specimen. The first part of the genus name, "Chavin", is from the ancient Chavín culture that inhabited the Andes mountains and coastal Peru from the 8th–2nd centuries B.C.E., while "Ziphius" is the type genus of the family Ziphiidae. The species name, maxillocristatus, is from two Latin words, referring to the strong rostral crests on the animal's maxilla.

== Classification ==
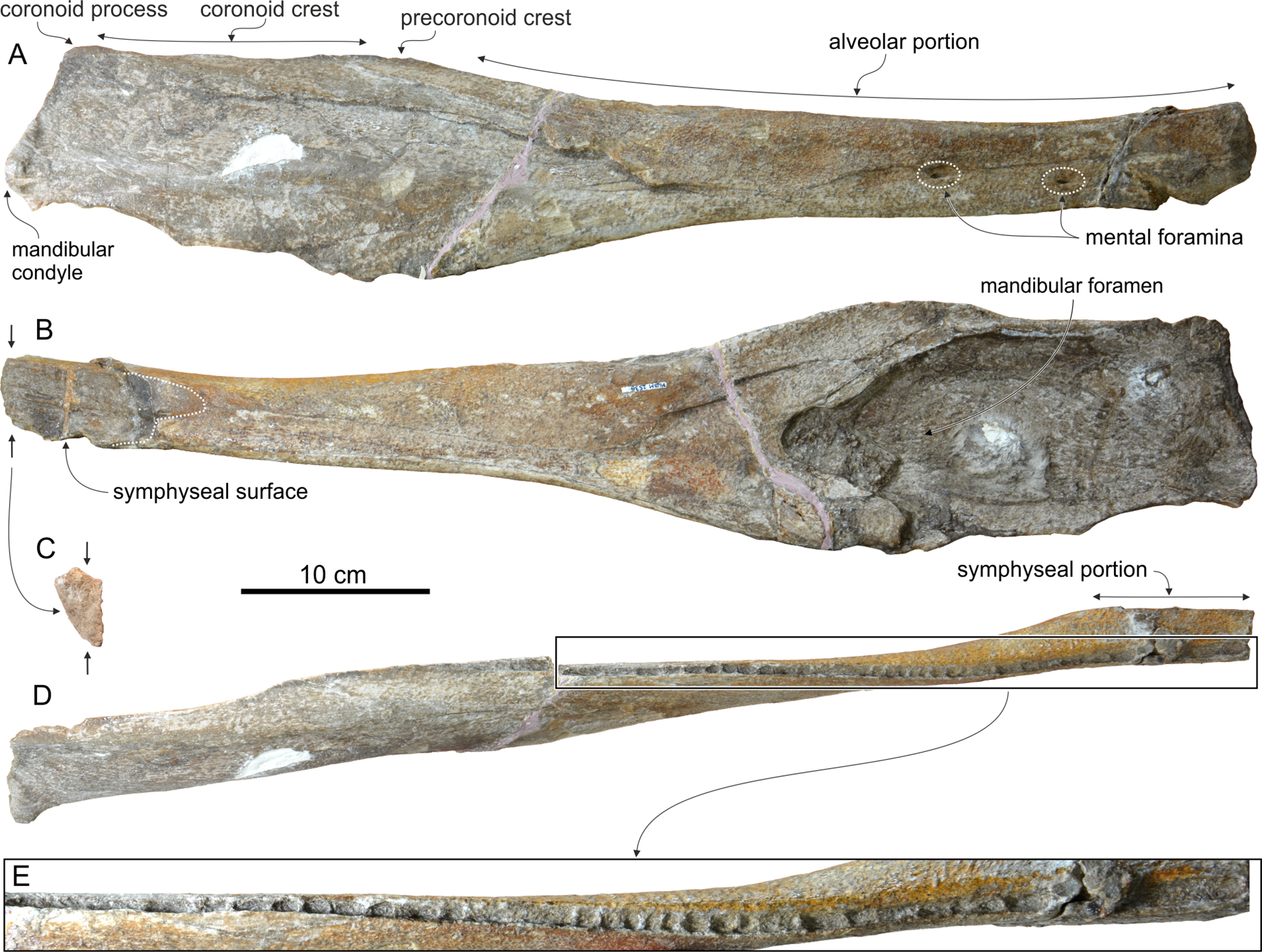
Holotype mandible

The results of the phylogenetic analysis done by Biannucci et al. (2016) are shown below:

- Ziphiidae
  - †Chavinziphius
  - - †Ninoziphius
    - - Crown Ziphiidae
      - †Messapicetus clade
        - - †Chimuziphius
          - †Notoziphius
        - - †Messapicetus
          - - †Ziphirostrum
            - - †Aporotus spp.
              - - †Beneziphius
                - - †Choneziphius
                  - - †Imocetus
                    - - †Globicetus
                      - †Tusciziphius

== Palaeoecology ==
The fossils of Chavinziphius were found in the Cerro Los Quesos locality of the Pisco Formation, which has also yielded fossils of other toothed whales (Acrophyseter, the porpoise Lomacetus and, an indeterminate kogiid similar to Scaphokogia), and indeterminate baleen whales (cetotheriids and balaenopterids). Other fossil animals include seals, sharks, crocodylians and sea birds.
