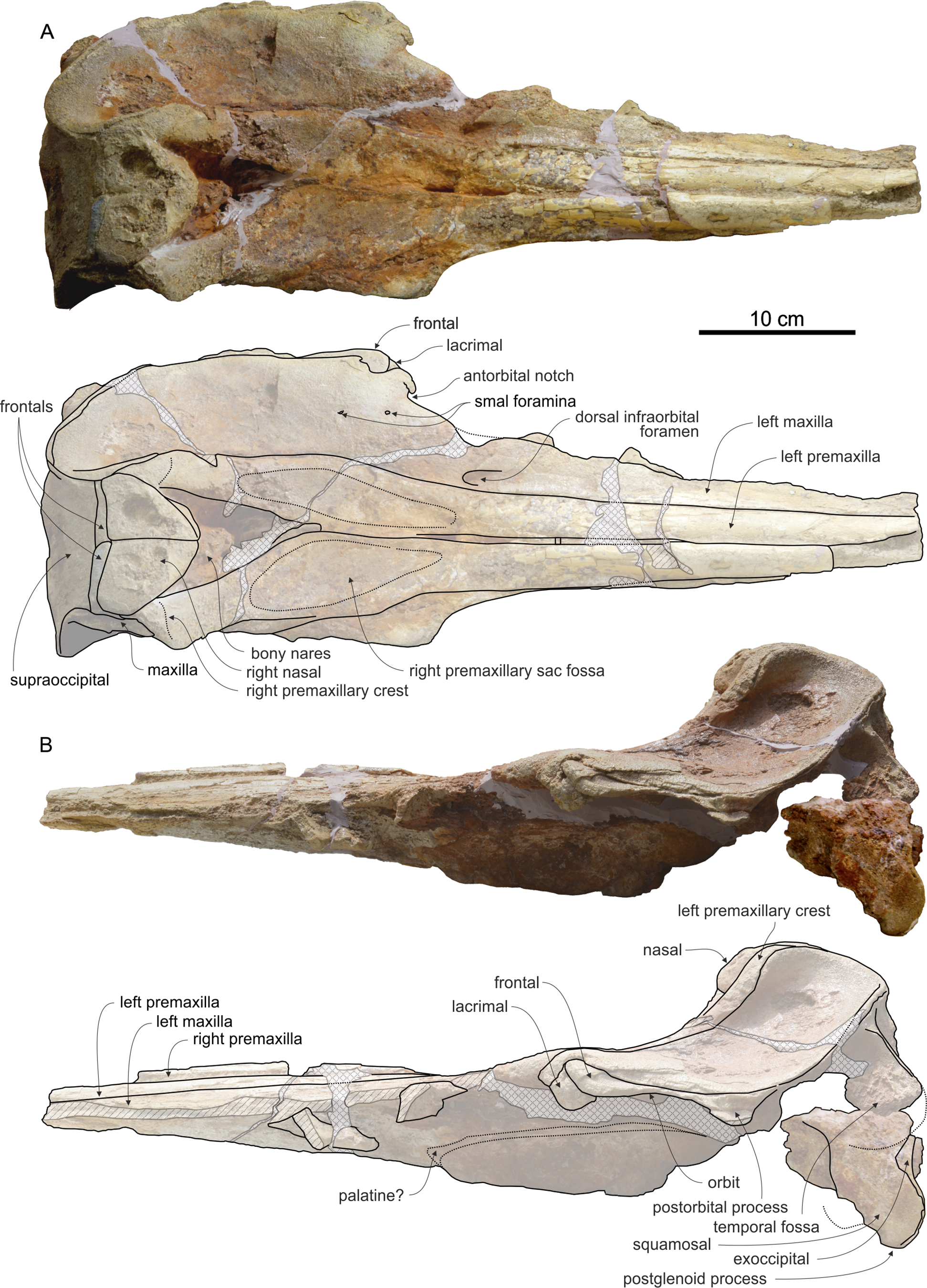
- Holotype cranium

Scientific classification
- Kingdom: Animalia
- Phylum: Chordata
- Class: Mammalia
- Infraclass: Placentalia
- Order: Artiodactyla
- Infraorder: Cetacea
- Family: Ziphiidae
- Genus: †Chimuziphius; Bianucci et al., 2016
- Species: †C. coloradensis

Binomial name
- †Chimuziphius coloradensis Bianucci et al., 2016

= Chimuziphius =

Chimuziphius Temporal range: Miocene (Tortonian), ~9.9–8.9 Ma

Chimuziphius is an extinct genus of beaked whale (family Ziphiidae) known from the Miocene (Tortonian age) Pisco Formation of Peru. The genus contains a single species, Chimuziphius coloradensis.

== Discovery and naming ==
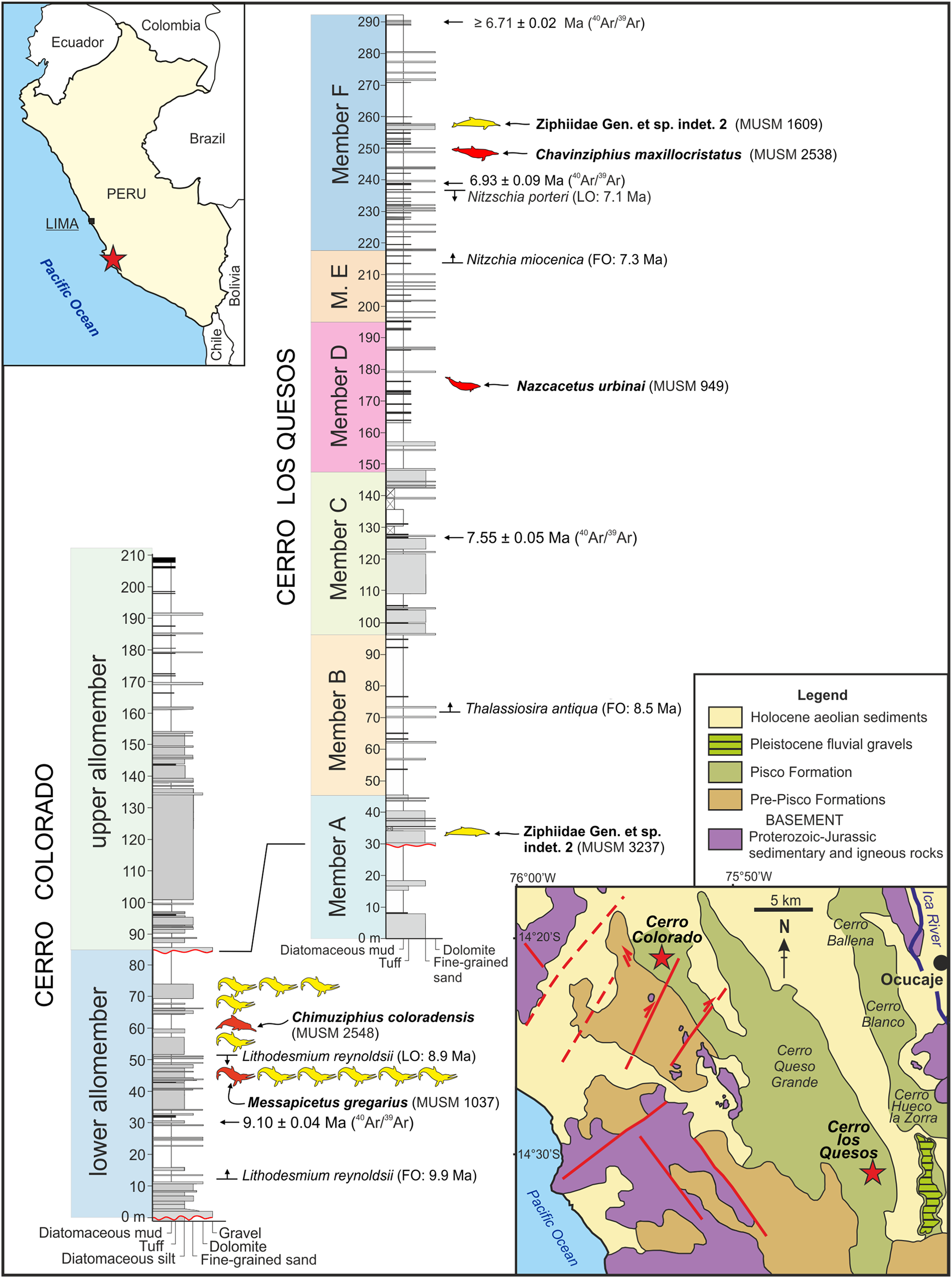
Type locality (Cerro Colarado)

The only known fossil of Chimuziphius was discovered in the Cerro Colarado locality of the Pisco Formation in the Pisco-Ica Desert of Peru between 2014 and 2016. This specimen includes a partial cranium (MUSM 2548), missing parts of the rostrum, neurocranial, and basicranial regions.

In 2016, Giovanni Bianucci and colleagues described Chimuziphius coloradensis as a new genus and species of ziphiid whale, establishing MUSM 2548 as the holotype specimen. The first part of the genus name, "Chimu", comes from the Chimú culture, an ancient northern coastal Peruvian culture from the 12th–14th centuries, while "Ziphius" is the type genus of Ziphiidae. The specific name comes from the Cerro Colorado site of the Pisco Formation, where the remains of the taxon were found.

== Classification ==
The results of the phylogenetic analysis done by Biannucci et al. (2016) are shown below:

- Ziphiidae
  - †Chavinziphius
  - - †Ninoziphius
    - - Crown Ziphiidae
      - †Messapicetus clade
        - - †Chimuziphius
          - †Notoziphius
        - - †Messapicetus
          - - †Ziphirostrum
            - - †Aporotus spp.
              - - †Beneziphius
                - - †Choneziphius
                  - - †Imocetus
                    - - †Globicetus
                      - †Tusciziphius

== Palaeoecology ==
Many other animals are known from the Pisco Formation, including other cetaceans such as physeteroids (Livyatan melvillei), pontoporiids (Brachydelphis mazeasi), other ziphiids (Messapicetus gregarius), delphinidans similar to kentriodontids, indeterminate cetotheriids and balaeonopterid mysticetes. Crocodylians, sea turtles (Pacifichelys urbinai) seabirds (Sula brandi and Sula figueroae), lamniform sharks (Otodus and Cosmopolitodus), and bony fish are also known.
