= Africanacetus =

Africanacetus Temporal range: Late Miocene-Early Pliocene ~5.3–3.6 Ma

Scientific classification
- Kingdom: Animalia
- Phylum: Chordata
- Class: Mammalia
- Order: Artiodactyla
- Infraorder: Cetacea
- Family: Ziphiidae
- Genus: †Africanacetus; Bianucci et al. 2007

Species
- †A. ceratopsis Bianucci et al. 2007 (type); †A. gracilis Ichishima et al. 2017

Extinct genus of beaked whale

Africanacetus is an extinct genus of ziphiid cetacean known from skulls found in seafloor sediments of Late Miocene to Early Pliocene age off the coasts of South Africa (Banzare Bank), Brazil (São Paulo Ridge), and the Indian Ocean.

== Classification ==
Africanacetus is placed within the family Ziphiidae and subfamily Hyperoodontinae. It was first described in 2007 from Neogene deposits off South Africa, with Africanacetus ceratopsis as the type species. Two species are currently recognized, A. ceratopsis and A. gracilis, which differ in cranial proportions, with A. gracilis possessing a more slender skull than the more robust A. ceratopsis. Additional material from the sub-Antarctic Indian Ocean has been referred to Africanacetus sp. and may represent a third, as yet undescribed species. The genus is closely related to extant hyperoodontines such as Mesoplodon, Hyperoodon, and Indopacetus, sharing with them key cranial specializations including a mesorostral groove filled by dense bone and a highly modified vertex.

== Description ==
The known species and referred material of Africanacetus differ primarily in overall size, robustness of the rostrum, and degree of cranial ossification. A. ceratopsis is a large beaked whale (between 5-7.5 m or 16-25 ft) characterized by a robust rostrum and well-developed dome-like maxillary crests, forming the baseline morphology for the genus. In contrast, A. gracilis possesses a more slender and gracile skull, with comparatively reduced robustness of the rostrum and facial structures. The sub-Antarctic specimens referred to Africanacetus sp. are notably larger than A. ceratopsis, estimated at around 6 m (20 ft) with a broader and more massive rostrum and especially hypertrophied mesorostral ossification, suggesting either pronounced intraspecific variation or the presence of a distinct, as yet undescribed species. The development of the vertex and surrounding cranial structures implies complex sound production and focusing capabilities, with the melon likely functioning in acoustic beam formation as in extant ziphiids.

== Paleobiology ==
The cranial morphology of Africanacetus indicates it was a deep-diving beaked whale that relied on echolocation. Like extant beaked whales, it likely used a well-developed melon to focus sound during foraging. The reduction of functional dentition in related ziphiids and the reinforced rostrum suggest a suction-feeding strategy targeting soft-bodied prey such as squid and small fish. The pronounced development of maxillary crests and mesorostral ossification is interpreted as sexually dimorphic and may have been associated with male-specific behaviors such as combat.

== Paleoecology ==
Africanacetus inhabited offshore marine environments during the Neogene and is known from a wide geographic range across the Southern Hemisphere. Fossils are typically recovered from deep-sea deposits, often as phosphatized or manganese-encrusted remains, indicating reworking and long-term exposure on the sea floor. The South African assemblage is associated with the Benguela upwelling system, a highly productive marine environment that likely supported a diverse community of deep-diving predators, including multiple species of beaked whales.
