= Mesoplodon slangkopi =

Mesoplodon slangkopi Temporal range: Middle Miocene–Late Miocene

Scientific classification
- Kingdom: Animalia
- Phylum: Chordata
- Class: Mammalia
- Order: Artiodactyla
- Infraorder: Cetacea
- Family: Ziphiidae
- Genus: Mesoplodon
- Species: †M. slangkopi

Binomial name
- †Mesoplodon slangkopi Bianucci, Lambert & Post, 2007

Extinct species of beaked whale

Mesoplodon slangkopi is an extinct species of beaked whale first described in 2007 from fossil material trawled off the coast of South Africa. It is known primarily from cranial remains and dates to the middle to late Miocene.

== Etymology ==
The species name slangkopi is derived from “Slangkop,” referring to a locality on the southwestern coast of South Africa near where fossil material was recovered. The name reflects the geographic origin of the species.

== Classification ==
Mesoplodon slangkopi is an extinct species of beaked whale within the family Ziphiidae. It is assigned to the genus Mesoplodon, which belongs to the subfamily Hyperoodontinae, a clade that also includes Hyperoodon and Indopacetus. Members of this subfamily are characterized by features of the skull such as a deep excavation of the nasal region and specialized structures associated with echolocation.

== Description ==
The species is known primarily from cranial material. Like other fossil ziphiids, the skull shows a long, narrow rostrum with a mesorostral groove filled by a dense vomer, a condition typical of Mesoplodon-like whales. The rostrum was likely robust and ossified, suggesting reinforcement against pressure during deep dives. The vertex region of the skull was compact and specialized, reflecting the complex nasal anatomy used in sound production. As in living members of the genus, the dentition was probably reduced, with functional teeth limited to a pair of mandibular tusks, likely more developed in males.

== Paleobiology ==
The cranial morphology of M. slangkopi indicates it was a deep-diving beaked whale and relied on echolocation to forage. Like extant Mesoplodonts, it was probably a suction feeder, capturing soft-bodied prey such as squid and small fish. The reduction of teeth and emphasis on jaw and throat musculature in related species supports this interpretation. Sexual dimorphism, common in modern beaked whales, likely involved differences in tusk size and possibly scarring behavior associated with intraspecific competition.

== Paleoecology ==
Mesoplodon slangkopi lived from the middle to late Miocene in marine environments off southern Africa. Fossils of this species were recovered from phosphatized deposits on the sea floor, suggesting burial in areas influenced by upwelling systems. The region was associated with the Benguela Current, which created highly productive waters rich in marine life. This high productivity likely supported a diverse assemblage of deep-sea prey, making it an ideal habitat for multiple coexisting beaked whale species, including M. slangkopi.
