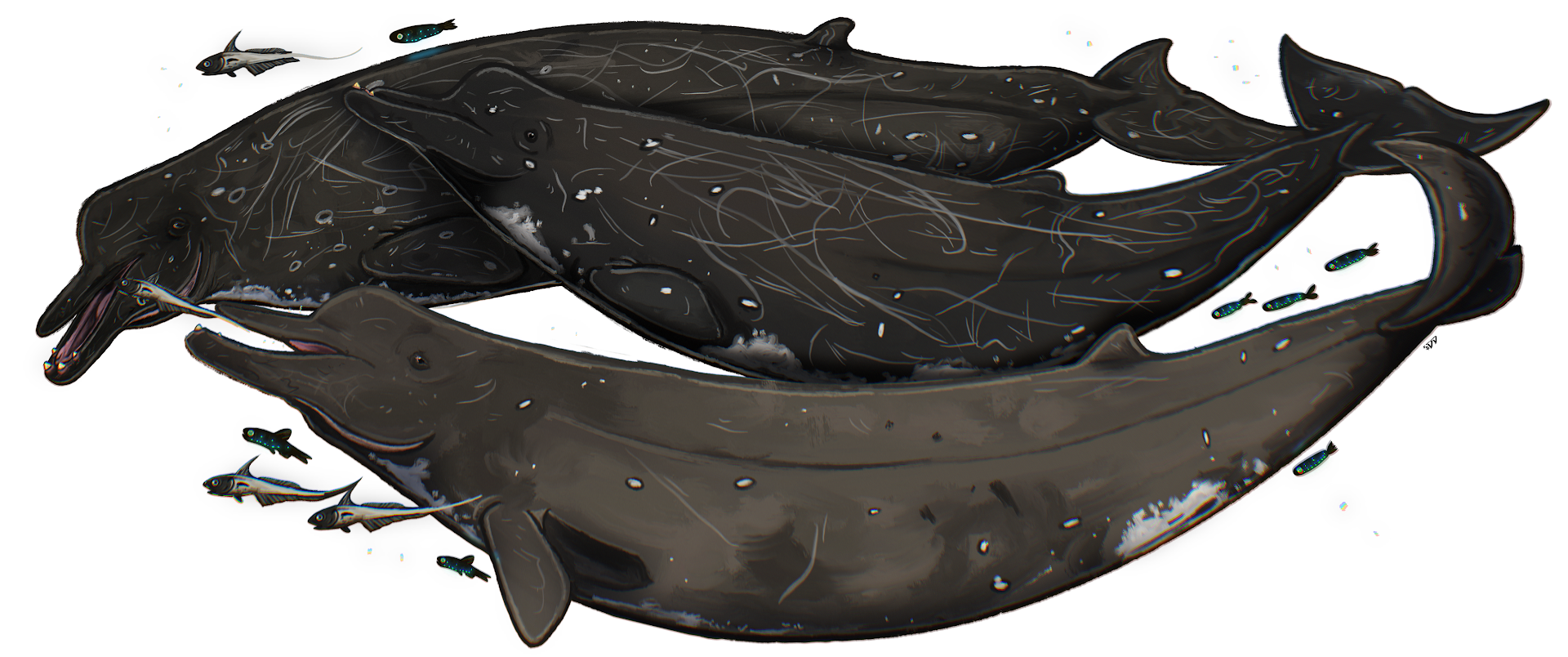
- A trio foraging on rattails and lanternfish.

Scientific classification
- Kingdom: Animalia
- Phylum: Chordata
- Class: Mammalia
- Order: Artiodactyla
- Infraorder: Cetacea
- Family: Ziphiidae
- Genus: Berardius
- Species: †B. kobayashii

Binomial name
- †Berardius kobayashii Kawatani & Kohno, 2021

= Berardius kobayashii =

Berardius kobayashii Temporal range: 12.3-11.5 Ma (Middle Miocene to Late Miocene)

Extinct species of whale

Berardius kobayashii is an extinct species of beaked whale in the genus Berardius, known from the Middle to Late Miocene of Japan. It is described from fossils recovered from the Tsurushi Formation on Sado Island. The species represents the oldest known member of the genus and provides insight into the early evolution of modern beaked whales.

== Etymology ==
The species name kobayashii honors Dr. Iwao Kobayashi for his contributions to the geology and paleontology of the Niigata region and for his role in facilitating the study of marine mammal fossils from Sado Island.

== Classification ==
Berardius kobayashii is placed within the subfamily Berardiinae alongside Berardius, Archaeoziphius, and Microberardius. Phylogenetic analyses place it within the genus Berardius, where it is closely related to Berardius minimus. The species represents the oldest known fossil record of the genus, providing a minimum age for its emergence during the Middle–Late Miocene transition.

== Description ==
Berardius kobayashii is a relatively small species for the genus, approximately 50–70% smaller than modern relatives. The cranium is small and slightly asymmetric, with a moderately elevated vertex and well-developed premaxillary crests. The nasals are short and trapezoidal, and the premaxillary sac fossae are shallow and weakly asymmetrical. The external bony nares are triangular and longer than wide, and the skull is proportionally low and broad. Cranial sutures are tightly closed, indicating the holotype represents an adult individual.

The maxilla is broad with prominent infraorbital foramina, and the temporal fossa is shallow and convex. The pterygoid region is well developed, with the hamular processes contacting medially to form a posteriorly directed point, a feature shared with Berardius minimus. The earbones, including the periotic and tympanic bulla, are relatively slender and display a combination of primitive and derived features.

The mandible is thin and fragile, with a well-developed coronoid crest and a posteriorly projecting mandibular condyle. The mandibular foramen is large and elongated, suggesting adaptations related to sound transmission. Postcranial material is limited, but overall morphology indicates a smaller-bodied whale with less extreme specialization than modern Berardius species.

== Paleobiology ==
Cranial features such as the premaxillary crests and moderately developed acoustic structures indicate that Berardius kobayashii was capable of echolocation, though likely less specialized than in modern deep-diving beaked whales. The thin mandible and enlarged mandibular foramen suggest adaptations for sound transmission and suction-feeding. Its smaller size and less derived morphology indicate a more generalized feeding strategy, likely involving soft-bodied prey such as squid and small fish. The species also exhibits features consistent with early stages of deep-diving adaptation, indicating that the specialized ecological and physiological traits of modern beaked whales were already developing by this time.

== Paleoecology ==
The Tsurushi Formation of Sado Island, Japan from which Berardius kobayashii is known consists of deep-sea siliceous mudstones deposited after the opening and deepening of the Sea of Japan, indicating a fully marine offshore environment. The formation has yielded a diverse assemblage of marine organisms, including mollusks, fish (Otodus megalodon, Isurus sp. and ray-finned fishes), sea turtles, birds, and numerous marine mammals such as cetaceans, pinnipeds (Allodesmus), and desmostylians. Fossils are commonly preserved within calcareous nodules. This evidence suggests that Berardius kobayashii inhabited offshore, pelagic environments and formed part of a diverse Miocene marine ecosystem.
