= Khoikhoicetus =

Khoikhoicetus Temporal range: probably Miocene

Scientific classification
- Domain: Eukaryota
- Kingdom: Animalia
- Phylum: Chordata
- Class: Mammalia
- Order: Artiodactyla
- Infraorder: Cetacea
- Family: Ziphiidae
- Genus: †Khoikhoicetus; Bianucci, Lambert, and Post, 2007

Species
- K. agulhasis Bianucci, Lambert & Post, 2007 (type); K. kergueleni Lambert, Muizon, Duhamel & van der Plicht, 2018

Extinct genus of cetaceans

Khoikhoicetus is an extinct genus of ziphiid cetacean known from skulls found on seafloor sediments of probable Miocene age off the coast of South Africa and the Kerguelen Islands.

== Systematics ==
Two species are known, K. agulhasis and K. kergueleni. The genus Khoikhoicetus is closely related to beaked whales of the genera Mesoplodon, Hyperoodon, and Indopacetus. The two species differ from each other in their size and the width of the premaxillary crests.
