= Caviziphius =

Scientific classification
- Domain: Eukaryota
- Kingdom: Animalia
- Phylum: Chordata
- Class: Mammalia
- Order: Artiodactyla
- Suborder: Whippomorpha
- Infraorder: Cetacea
- Family: Ziphiidae
- Genus: †Caviziphius; Bianucci & Post, 2005
- Species: †C. altirostris

Binomial name
- †Caviziphius altirostris Bianucci & Post, 2005

Fossil genus of mammals

Caviziphius is a fossil genus of beaked whale (Ziphiidae) probably from the Miocene around Belgium, Spain and Portugal. The type species is Caviziphius altirostris.
