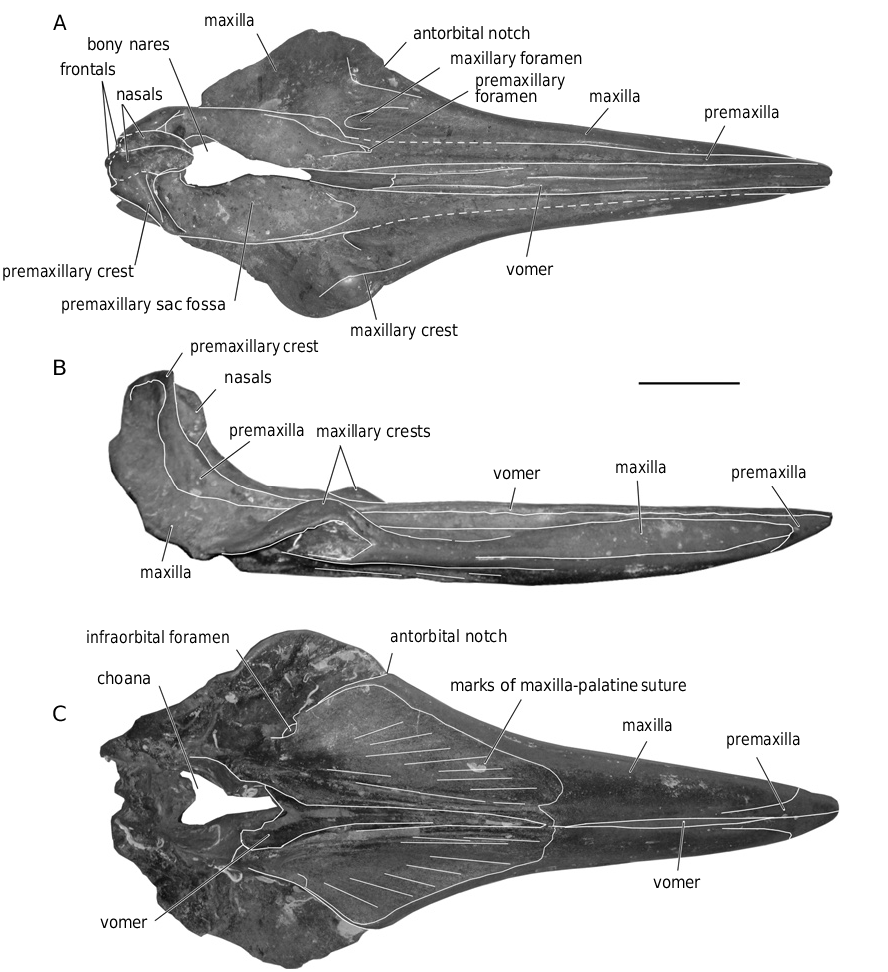
- Fossilized skull of I. rossi

Scientific classification
- Kingdom: Animalia
- Phylum: Chordata
- Class: Mammalia
- Order: Artiodactyla
- Infraorder: Cetacea
- Family: Ziphiidae
- Subfamily: Ziphiinae
- Genus: †Izikoziphius; Bianucci et al., 2007

Type species
- Izikoziphius rossi Bianucci et al., 2007

Species
- I. angustus Bianucci et al., 2007

= Izikoziphius =

Izikoziphius Temporal range: Unknown (likely Miocene or Pliocene)

Extinct genus of beaked whale

Izikoziphius is an extinct genus of beaked whale. It contains two species: Izikoziphius rossi, and Izikoziphius angustus.

== Etymology ==
The genus is named after the Iziko South African Museum. Its grammatical gender (in Latin) is masculine. Izikoziphius rossi is named after Dr. Graham James Berry Ross from the Port Elizabeth Museum in South Africa.

== Description ==
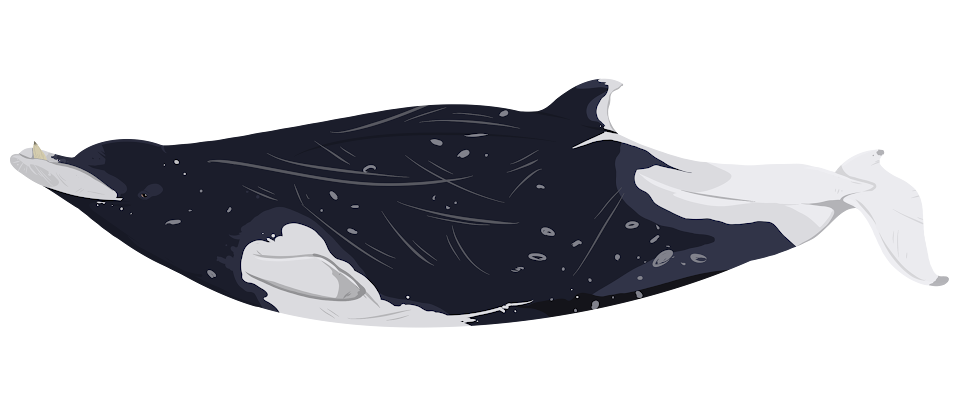
Restoration of an adult male I. angustus.

Izikoziphius is different from the other genus in the subfamily Ziphiinae in that it has a longer rostrum, and lacks a prenarial basin. Izikoziphius rossi has a rostrum length of 490-530 millimeters, and a width and height of 94-155 and 84-100 millimeters, respectively. It differs from I. angustus in having a rostrum with a mid-length width more than that of its mid-length height. The base of its rostrum is also wider.

== Distribution ==
Fossils of this species were found off the coast of South Africa.
