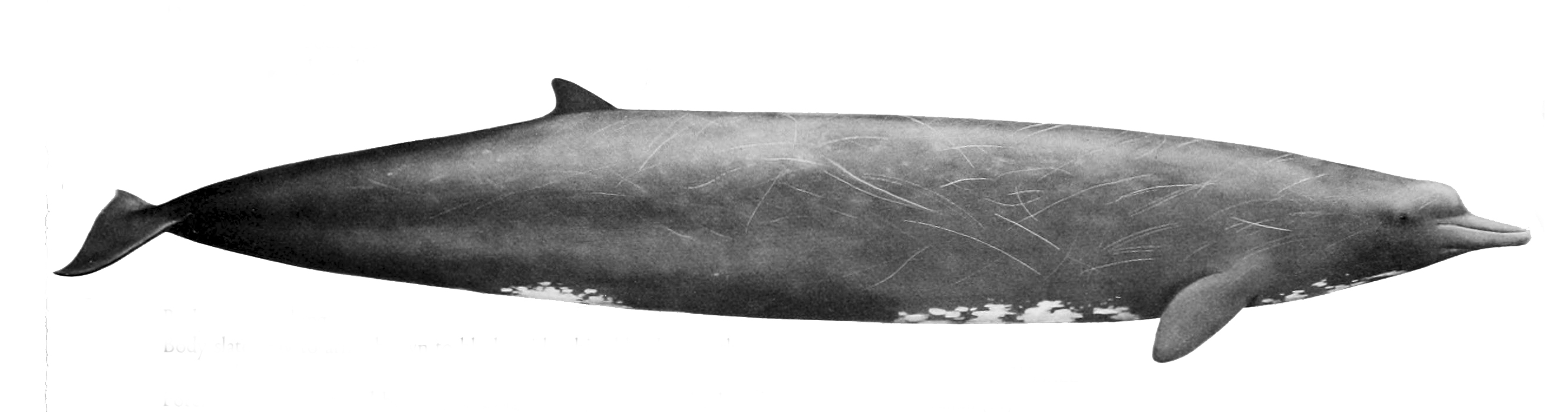
- Baird's beaked whale (Berardius bairdii)

Scientific classification
- Kingdom: Animalia
- Phylum: Chordata
- Class: Mammalia
- Order: Artiodactyla
- Infraorder: Cetacea
- Parvorder: Odontoceti
- (unranked): Physeterida
- Superfamily: Ziphioidea
- Family: Ziphiidae; Gray, 1865

Type genus
- Ziphius Cuvier, 1823

Genera
- See text
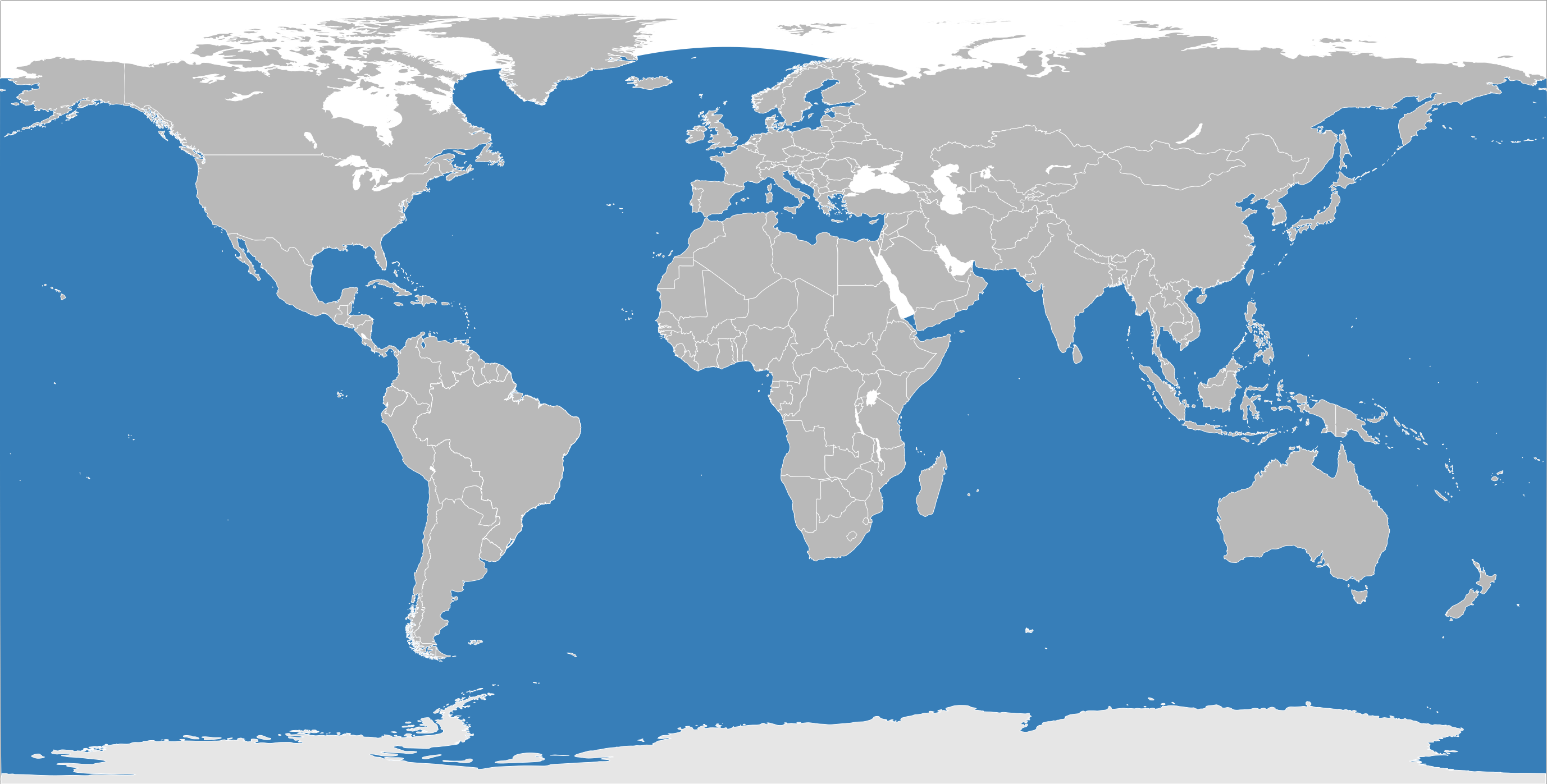
- Ziphiidae distribution

Synonyms
- Hyperoodontidae Gray, 1846

= Beaked whale =

Beaked whale Temporal range: Miocene–Recent

Family of mammals

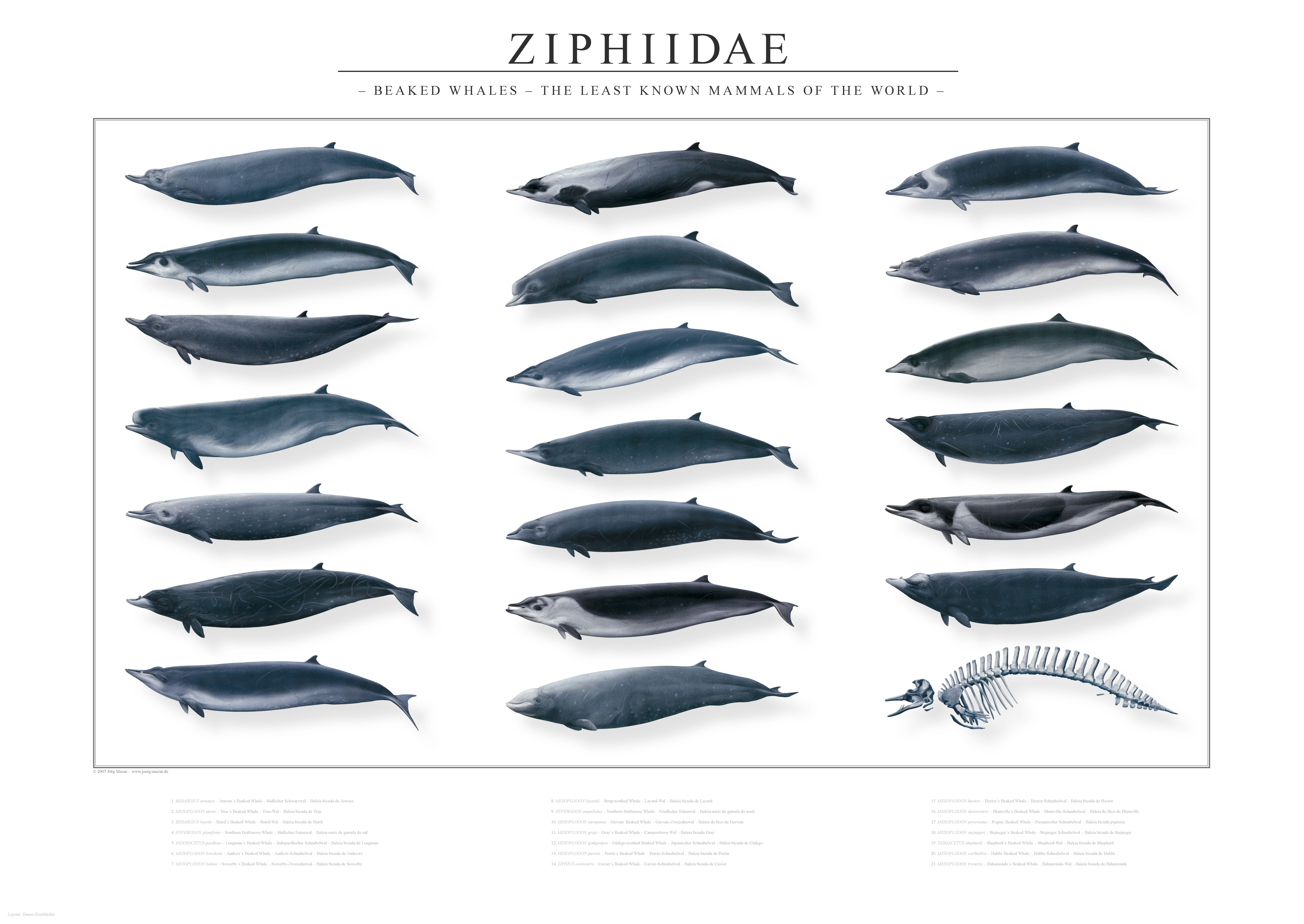
All known beaked whales as of 2007

Beaked whales are members of the cetacean family Ziphiidae, noted as being one of the least-known groups of mammals because of their deep-sea habitat, reclusive behavior and apparent low abundance. There are 24 species currently recognised (with the last only added in 2021), but only three species of beaked whales that have been commercially hunted are reasonably well-known: Baird's beaked whales and Cuvier's beaked whales were subject to exploitation off the coast of Japan, while the northern bottlenose whale was extensively hunted in the northern part of the North Atlantic in the late 19th and early 20th centuries.

The first time the ginkgo-toothed beaked whale was documented alive was late 2020. Reports of the possible discovery of the new beaked whale species off the coast of Mexico have been confirmed in June 2024 via genetic analysis of a skin biopsy of the whale.

== Physical characteristics ==
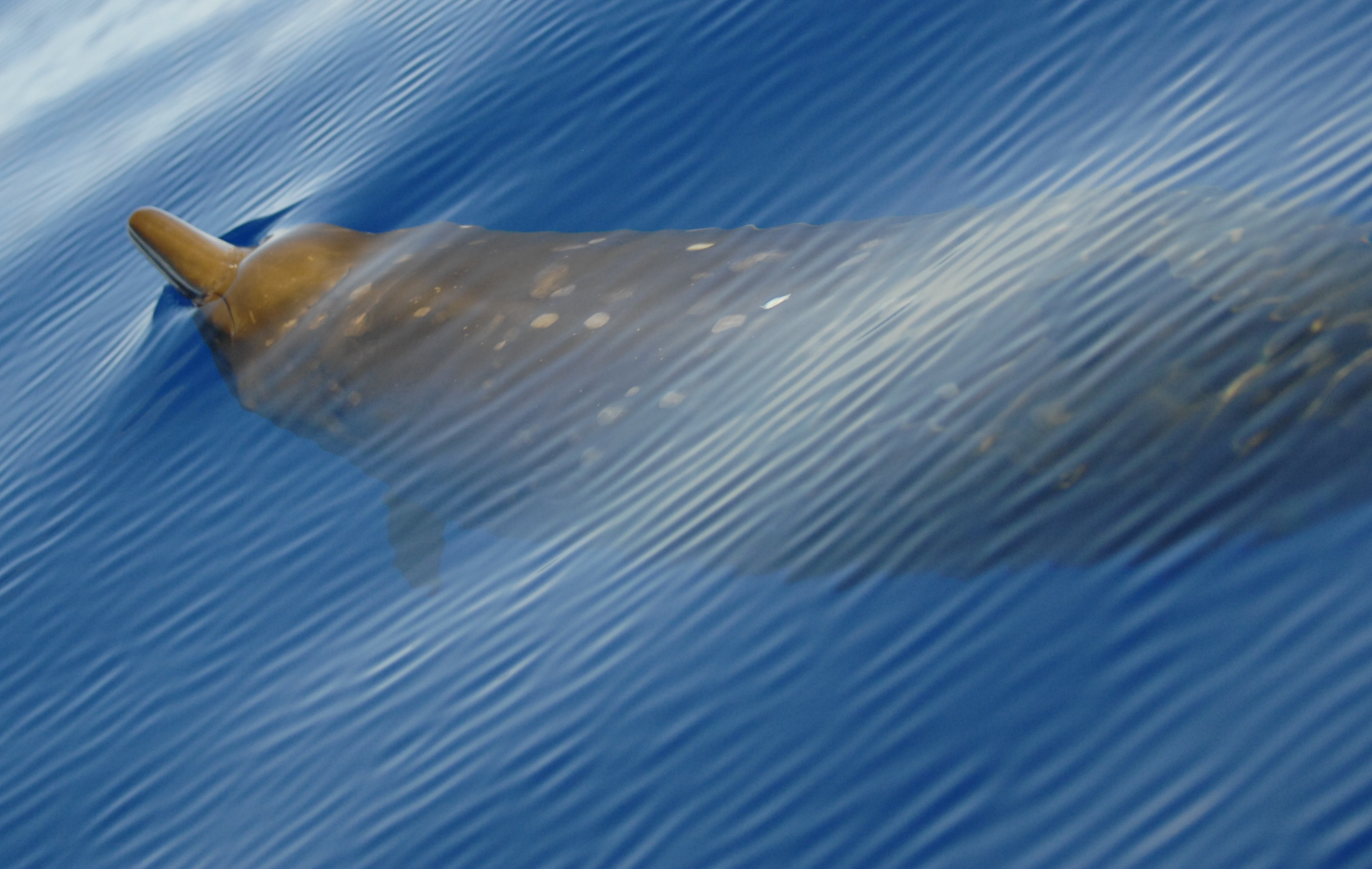
Blainville's beaked whale

Beaked whales are moderate in size, ranging from 4 to 13 metres (13 to 43 ft) and weighing from 1 to 15 tonnes (0.98 to 14.76 long tons; 1.1 to 16.5 short tons). Their key distinguishing feature is the presence of a 'beak', somewhat similar to many dolphins. Other distinctive features include a pair of converging grooves under the throat, and the absence of a notch in the tail fluke. Although Shepherd's beaked whale is an exception, most species have only one or two pairs of teeth, and even these do not erupt in females (other than in the genus Berardius). Beaked whale species are often sexually dimorphic – one or the other sex is significantly larger. The adult males often possess a large bulging forehead, some to an extreme degree. However, aside from dentition and size, very few morphological differences exist between male and female beaked whales.

Individual species may be very difficult to identify in the wild, since many species appear similar. The observer must rely on size, shape, and placement of teeth and often subtle differences in size, color, forehead shape, and beak length. In collected specimens, the expansion of the premaxillary process in the skull can be a key feature to identification.

The blubber of these whales is almost entirely (94%) composed of wax ester instead of the more usual triacylglycerols, a unique characteristic of this family.

=== Dentition ===
Beaked whales are unique among toothed whales in that most species have only one pair of teeth. The teeth are tusk-like, but are visible only in males, which are presumed to use these teeth in combat for females for reproductive rights. In females, the teeth do not develop and remain hidden in the gum tissues.

In December 2008, researchers from the Marine Mammal Institute at Oregon State University completed a DNA tree of 13 of 15 known species of Mesoplodon beaked whales (excluding the spade-toothed whale, which was then only known from a skeletal specimen and a few stranded specimens). Among the results of this study was the conclusion that the male's teeth are actually a secondary sexual characteristic, similar to the antlers of male deer. Each species' teeth have a characteristically unique shape. In some cases, these teeth even hinder feeding; in the strap-toothed whale, for example, the teeth curve over the upper jaw, effectively limiting the gape to a few centimeters. Females are presumed to select mates based on the shape of the teeth, because the different species are otherwise quite similar in appearance.

== Taxonomy ==
As of 2024, the Society for Marine Mammalogy Committee on Taxonomy recognizes 24 extant (living) species of beaked whales in six genera. Several species have only been formally described in the last two decades, most recently in 2021.

The beaked whales are the second-largest family of cetaceans after the oceanic dolphins (Delphinidae). Beaked whales were one of the first extant clades to diverge from the ancestral lineage. The earliest known beaked whale fossils date to the Miocene, about 15 million years ago.

A 2016 study split the beaked whales into the basal extinct Messapicetus clade (lineage) and the crown Ziphiidae which include all of the living members of the family as well as other extinct forms. Both clades share some key characteristics of the family including thick skull bones and the trend toward loss of teeth. In 2020, a molecular study further resolved the relationships among the crown Ziphiidae and placed Shepherd's beaked whale, the only living species with a full set of erupted teeth, between Berardiinae, whose extant forms have four erupted teeth, and Ziphiinae, whose extant form has two erupted teeth.

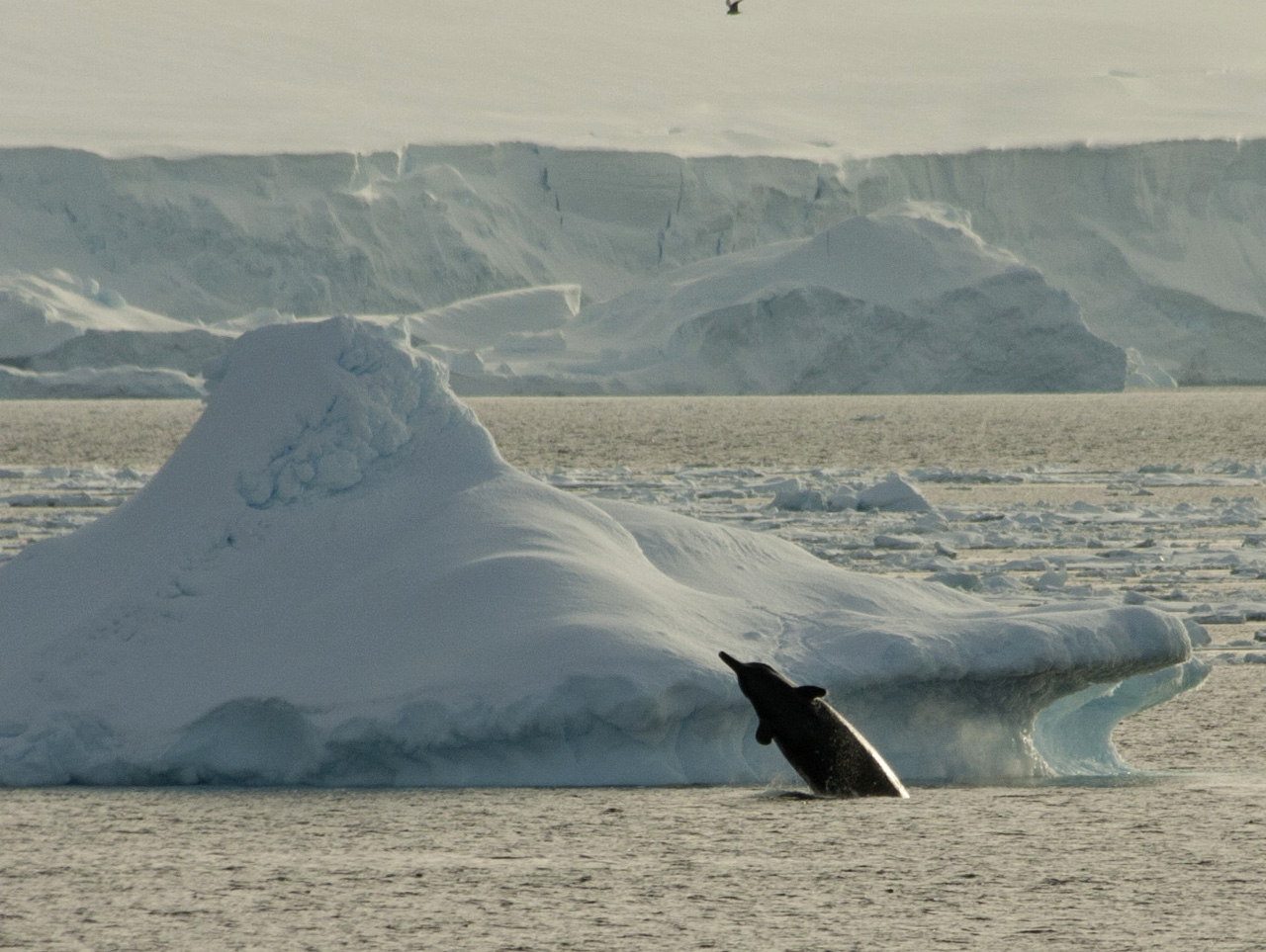
Arnoux's beaked whale

- Order Artiodactyla
- Infraorder Cetacea
- Parvorder Odontoceti: toothed whales
  - Family Ziphiidae
    - Incertae sedis
      - Genus †Anoplonassa
      - Genus †Caviziphius
      - Genus †Cetorhynchus
      - Genus †Eboroziphius
    - Genus †Ninoziphius
    - Genus †Notoziphius
      - Genus †Pelycorhamphus
    - Messapicetiformes
      - Genus †Aporotus
      - Genus †Beneziphius
      - Genus †Chavinziphius
      - Genus †Chimuziphius
      - Genus †Choneziphius
      - Genus †Dagonodum
      - Genus †Globicetus
      - Genus †Imocetus
      - Genus †Messapicetus
      - Genus †Tusciziphius
      - Genus †Ziphirostrum
    - Unnamed clade
      - Genus †Nazcacetus
    - Subfamily Berardiinae
      - Genus †Archaeoziphius
      - Genus Berardius
        - B. arnuxii, Arnoux's beaked whale
        - B. bairdii, Baird's beaked whale
        - B. minimus, Sato's beaked whale
        - †B. kobayashii
      - Genus †Microberardius
    - Unnamed clade
      - Genus Tasmacetus
        - T. shepherdi, Shepherd's beaked whale
    - Subfamily Ziphiinae
      - Genus †Izikoziphius
      - Genus Ziphius
        - Z. cavirostris, Cuvier's beaked whale
        - †Z. compressus
    - Subfamily Hyperoodontinae
      - Genus †Africanacetus
      - Genus †Belemnoziphius
      - Genus Hyperoodon, bottlenose whales
        - H. ampullatus, northern bottlenose whale
        - H. planifrons, southern bottlenose whale
      - Genus †Ihlengesi
      - Genus Indopacetus
        - I. pacificus, tropical bottlenose whale
      - Genus †Khoikhoicetus
      - Genus Mesoplodon, mesoplodont whales
        - M. bidens, Sowerby's beaked whale
        - M. bowdoini, Andrews' beaked whale
        - M. carlhubbsi, Hubbs' beaked whale
        - M. densirostris, Blainville's beaked whale
        - M. eueu, Ramari's beaked whale
        - M. europaeus, Gervais's beaked whale
        - M. ginkgodens, ginkgo-toothed beaked whale
        - M. grayi, Gray's beaked whale
        - M. hectori, Hector's beaked whale
        - M. layardii, strap-toothed beaked whale
        - M. mirus, True's beaked whale
        - M. peruvianus, pygmy beaked whale
        - M. perrini, Perrin's beaked whale
        - M. stejnegeri, Stejneger's beaked whale
        - M. traversii, spade-toothed beaked whale
        - M. hotaula, Deraniyagala's beaked whale
        - †M. longirostris
        - †M. posti
        - †M. slangkopi
        - †M. tumidirostris
      - Genus †Nenga
      - Genus †Pterocetus
      - Genus †Xhosacetus

=== Etymology ===
The name Ziphiidae was coined from the genus Ziphius by J. E. Gray in 1865 to move the beaked whales from the family Delphinidae into a new family. Gray noted in 1866, however, that Hyperoodontidae should have priority for the new beaked whale family name owing to earlier usage (in 1846), but Gray preferred Ziphiidae due to an apparent confusion between the upper and lower jaw (or the terminology) in the naming of Hyperoodon.

Hyperoodontidae was preferred in a 1968 phylogeny, which stated that Gray's objection did not qualify as an exception under the International Code of Zoological Nomenclature (ICZN). Hyperoodontidae is indeed currently marked as the valid name by the Integrated Taxonomic Information System (ITIS) which states no successful petition for Ziphiidae had been made to the ICZN as of 2023. In contrast, Smithsonian researchers J.G. Mead and Robert Brownell Jr. argued in 1993 that due to being the "name of choice for over 100 years", Ziphiidae should be given exception under the ICZN Article 23.12. In addition, several authorities, including the Society for Marine Mammalogy Committee on Taxonomy and IUCN Red List of Threatened Species among others continue to use Ziphiidae.

A further, unrelated confusion has arisen, as noted on the ITIS, due to the propagation of an incorrect citation of "Gray, 1850" for Ziphiidae.

=== Evolutionary history ===
As many as 26 genera antedate humans. These include ancestors of giant beaked whales (Berardius), such as Microberardius, and ancestors of Cuvier's beaked whale (Ziphius); they had many relatives, such as Caviziphius, Archaeoziphius, and Izikoziphius. They were probably preyed upon by predatory whales and sharks, including Otodus megalodon. Recently, a large fossil ziphiid sample was discovered off the South African coast, confirming the extant ziphiid diversity might just be a remnant of a higher past diversity. After studying numerous fossil skulls off the shore of Iberia and South Africa, researchers discovered the absence of functional maxillary teeth in all South African fossil ziphiids, which is evidence that suction feeding had already developed in several beaked whale lineages during the Miocene. Researchers also found fossil ziphiids with robust skulls, signaling that tusks were used for male-male interactions (speculated with extant beaked whales).

== Ecology ==
=== Diving ===
Beaked whales are deep divers with extreme dive profiles. They regularly dive deeper than 500 m (1,600 ft) to echolocate for food, and these deep dives are often followed by multiple shallower dives less than 500 m. This pattern is not always followed, however. Animals have been observed spending more than an hour at or near the surface breathing. Beaked whales are often seen surfacing synchronously, but asynchronous surfacing has also been observed. In March 2014, a study by Cascadia Research revealed that Cuvier's beaked whales were recorded to dive at least 2992 m in depth, a mammalian record. Another study, published in 2020, reported a Cuvier's beaked whale making a dive that lasted 222 minutes (3.7 h), another mammalian record.

Deep-diving mammals face a number of challenges related to extended breath-holding and hydrostatic pressure. Cetaceans and pinnipeds that prolong apnea must optimize the size and use of their oxygen stores, and they must deal with the accumulation of lactic acid due to anaerobic metabolism. Beaked whales have several anatomical adaptations to deep diving: large spleens, livers, and body shape. Most cetaceans have small spleens. However, beaked whales have much larger spleens than delphinids, and may have larger livers, as well. These anatomical traits, which are important for filtering blood, could be adaptations to deep diving. Another notable anatomical adaptation among beaked whales is a slight depression in the body wall that allows them to hold their pectoral flippers tightly against their bodies for increased streamlining. However, they are not invulnerable to the effects of diving so deep and so often. Cascadia Research shows that the deeper the whales dive, the less often they dive per day, cutting their efforts by at least 40%.

The challenges of deep diving are also overcome by the unique diving physiology of beaked whales. Oxygen storage during dives is mostly achieved by blood hemoglobin and muscle myoglobin. While the whale is diving, its heart rate slows and blood flow changes. This physiological dive response ensures oxygen-sensitive tissues maintain a supply of oxygen, while those tissues tolerant to hypoxia receive less blood flow. Additionally, lung collapse obviates the exchange of lung gas with blood, likely minimizing the uptake of nitrogen by tissues.

=== Feeding ===
The throats of all beaked whales have a bilaterally paired set of grooves that are associated with their unique feeding mechanism, suction feeding. Instead of capturing prey with their teeth, beaked whales suck it into their oral cavity. Suction is aided by the throat grooves, which stretch and expand to accommodate food. Their tongues can move very freely. By suddenly retracting the tongue and distending the gular (throat) floor, pressure immediately drops within the mouth, sucking the prey in with the water.

Dietary information is available from stomach contents analyses of stranded beaked whales and from whaling operations. Their preferred diet is primarily deep-water squid, but also benthic and benthopelagic fish and some crustaceans, mostly taken near the sea floor. In a recent study, gouge marks in the sea floor were interpreted to be a result of feeding activities by beaked whales.

To understand the hunting and foraging behavior of beaked whales, researchers used sound and orientation recording devices on two species: Cuvier's beaked whale (Ziphius cavirostris) and Blainville's beaked whale (Mesoplodon densirostris). These whales hunt by echolocation in deep water (where the majority of their prey is located) between about 200 and 1,885 m (656 and 6,184 ft) and usually catch about 30 prey per dive. Cuvier's beaked whales must forage on average at 1,070 m (3,510 ft) for 58 minutes and Blainville's beaked whales typically forage at 835 m (2,740 ft) deep for an average of 47 minutes.

=== Range and habitat ===
The family Ziphiidae is one of the most widespread families of cetaceans, ranging from the ice edges at both the north and south poles, to the equator in all the oceans. Specific ranges vary greatly by species, though beaked whales typically inhabit offshore waters that are at least 300 m deep.

Beaked whales are known to congregate in deep waters off the edge of continental shelves, and bottom features, such as seamounts, canyons, escarpments, and oceanic islands, including the Azores and the Canary Islands, and even off the coasts of Hawaii.

== Life history ==
Very little is known about the life history of beaked whales. The oldest recorded age is 84 years for a male Baird's beaked whale and 54 years for a female. For all other beaked whale species studied, the oldest recorded age is between 27 and 39 years. Sexual maturity is reached between seven and 15 years of age in Baird's beaked whales and northern bottlenose whales. Gestation varies greatly between species, lasting 17 months for Baird's beaked whales and 12 months for the northern bottlenose whale. No data is available on their reproductive rates.

Determining group size for beaked whales is difficult, due to their inconspicuous surfacing behavior. Groups of beaked whales, defined as all individuals found in the same location at the same time, have been reported as ranging from one to 100 individuals. Nevertheless, some populations' group size has been estimated from repeated observations. For example, northern and southern bottlenose whales (H. ampullatus and H. planifrons), Cuvier's beaked whales, and Blainville's beaked whales (Mesoplodon densirostris) have a reported maximum group size of 20 individuals, with the average ranging from 2.5 to 3.5 individuals. Berardius species and Longman's beaked whales (Indopacetus pacificus) are found in larger groups of up to 100 individuals.

Not much information is available about group composition of beaked whales. Only four species have been studied in great detail: northern bottlenose whale, Blainville's beaked whale, Baird's beaked whale, and Cuvier's beaked whale. Female northern bottlenose whales appear to form a loose network of social partners with no obvious long-term associations. In contrast to females, some male northern bottlenose whales have been repeatedly recorded together over several years, and possibly form long-term associations. Studies of Blainville's beaked whales have revealed groups usually consist of a number of females, calves, and/or juvenile animals occasionally accompanied by single males. Drawing on similarities with other mammal species, it has been concluded that this species may therefore engage in female-defense polygyny. Baird's beaked whales are known to occur in multiple male groups, and in large groups consisting of adult animals of both sexes. There has been some evidence from the Commander Islands of multi-year stability in these groups. Arnoux's beaked whales have also been observed to form large pods of up to 47 individuals off the Southern Ocean off the coast of Kemp Land, Antarctica. While males may form short-term associations in the Cuvier's beaked whale, there do not appear to be long term bonds in this species and relatively high rates of fission and fusion within and among groups have been observed.

== Conservation ==
For many years, most beaked whale species were insulated from anthropogenic impacts because of their remote habitat. However, now several issues of concern include:

- Studies of stranded beaked whales show rising levels of toxic chemicals in their blubber.
- As a top predator, beaked whales, like raptors, are particularly vulnerable to build-up of biocontaminants. They can ingest plastic (which can be lethal).
- They more frequently become trapped in trawl nets, due to the expansion of deepwater fisheries.
- Decompression sickness

A major conservation concern for beaked whales (family Ziphiidae) is they appear to be vulnerable to modern sonar operations, which arises from recent strandings that temporally and physically coincide with naval sonar exercises. Mid-frequency active sonar (MFAS), developed in the 1950s for submarine detection, is thought to induce panic when experienced by whales at depth. This raises their heart-rates, forcing them to attempt to rapidly ascend toward the surface in search of air. This artificially-induced rapid ascent can cause decompression.

Post mortem examinations of the stranded whales in concurrence with naval exercises have reported the presence of hemorrhaging near the ears or gas and fat emboli, which could have a deleterious impact on beaked whales that is analogous to decompression sickness in humans. Gas and fat emboli have been shown to cause nervous and cardiovascular system dysfunction, respiratory distress, pain, and disorientation in both humans and animals. In the inner ear, gas embolism can cause hemorrhages, leading to disorientation or vestibular dysfunction.

Breath-holding divers, like beaked whales, can develop decompression-related problems (the "bends") when they return to the surface after deep dives. This is a possible hypothesis for the mass strandings of pelagic beaked whales associated with sonar-related activities. To illustrate, a diving beaked whale may be surfacing from a deep dive and must pass vertically through varying received sound levels. Since the whale has limited remaining oxygen supplies at the end of a long dive, it probably has limited abilities to display any normal sound avoidance behavior. Instead, the whale must continue to swim toward the surface to replenish its oxygen stores. Avoiding sonar inevitably requires a change in behavior or surfacing pattern. Therefore, sonar in close proximity to groups of beaked whales has the potential to cause hemorrhaging or to disorient the animal, eventually leading to a stranding.

Current research reveals two species of beaked whales are most affected by sonar: Cuvier's (Z. cavirostris) and Blainville's (M. densirostris) beaked whales. These animals have been reported as stranding in correlation with military exercises in Greece, the Bahamas, Madeira, and the Canary Islands. The livers of these animals had the most damage.

In 2019, a review of evidence on the mass strandings of beaked whale linked to naval exercises where sonar was used was published. It concluded that the effects of mid-frequency active sonar are strongest on Cuvier's beaked whales but vary among individuals or populations, and the strength of their response may depend on whether the individuals had prior exposure to sonar. The report considered that the most plausible explanation of the symptoms of decompression sickness such as gas embolism found in stranded whales to be the whales' response to sonar. It noted that no more mass strandings had occurred in the Canary Islands once naval exercises where sonar was used were banned there, and recommended that the ban be extended to other areas where mass strandings continue to occur.

Four species are classified by the IUCN as "lower risk, conservation dependent": Arnoux's and Baird's beaked whales, and the northern and southern bottlenose whales. The status of the remaining species is unknown, preventing classification.

== Captivity ==
Beaked whales have only rarely been kept in captivity and generally for very short time periods. Most animals taken into captivity have been captured after live-stranding and may have been in poor health only to die shortly thereafter.

The longest time period for a beaked whale living in captivity was 25 days, the record held by a whale named Alexander, one of two presumed Hubbs' beaked whale calves that stranded on August 24, 1989, on a beach in San Francisco, California, USA. Both whales were taken to Marine World Africa USA, in Vallejo, California. The animals were kept in a 9.7 meter diameter by 2.7 meter deep pool. The second whale, named Nicholas, died after 15 days in captivity. Alexander, the smaller of the two whales, died of pneumonia, while the cause of death for Nicholas was not determined.

A small number of other beaked whales have been kept in captivity. Notably, a Cuvier's beaked whale captured on 02 February, 1992 and held at Sea World of Florida was released after nine days about 30 miles offshore into the Atlantic Ocean. Perhaps the only successful release of a beaked whale, the animal was freeze branded for future identification before release. A rare True's beaked whale, later named Hope, the only member of its species known to be held in captivity, was taken after live-stranding on 02 January, 1973. It was held for about two days in a backyard swimming pool which had been pumped full of seawater before being transferred to the Coney Island Aquarium where it died approximately 2 days later. A juvenile female Cuvier's beaked whale was found stranded on a kelp bed off of Santa Catalina Island on 23 February 1956. She was taken to Marineland of the Pacific, where she was named Martha Washington. On 16 June 1969, a Blainville's beaked whale live stranded in St. Augustine. The whale, thought to be a male, was then transported to Marineland of Florida. It is unknown what happened to the whale, but it was still alive on 18 June 1969.
