= Xhosacetus =

Scientific classification
- Kingdom: Animalia
- Phylum: Chordata
- Class: Mammalia
- Order: Artiodactyla
- Infraorder: Cetacea
- Family: Ziphiidae
- Genus: †Xhosacetus; Bianucci et al. 2007
- Species: †X. hendeysi

Binomial name
- †Xhosacetus hendeysi Bianucci et al. 2007

Extinct genus of mammals

Xhosacetus is a genus of ziphiid cetaceans with a single species, Xhosacetus hendeysi. It was classified from fossils found off the coast of the Kerguelen islands in 1,145 meter deep water.
