= Microberardius =

Microberardius Temporal range: Miocene

Scientific classification
- Kingdom: Animalia
- Phylum: Chordata
- Class: Mammalia
- Order: Artiodactyla
- Infraorder: Cetacea
- Family: Ziphiidae
- Genus: †Microberardius; Bianucci et al., 2007
- Species: †M. africanus

Binomial name
- †Microberardius africanus Bianucci et al., 2007

Extinct genus of mammals

Microberardius is an extinct genus of giant beaked whales (subfamily Berardiinae) that lived during the Miocene. The type species, M. africanus, is known from a partial skull which was found in South Africa in 2007.
