= Pterocetus =

Pterocetus Temporal range: Neogene (Pliocene), 5.3 Ma

Scientific classification
- Kingdom: Animalia
- Phylum: Chordata
- Class: Mammalia
- Infraclass: Placentalia
- Order: Artiodactyla
- Infraorder: Cetacea
- Family: Ziphiidae
- Genus: †Pterocetus; Bianucci et al., 2007

Type species
- †Pterocetus benguelae Bianucci et al., 2007

Other species
- †Pterocetus diamantinae Bianucci & Collareta, 2026

Extinct genus of whales

Pterocetus is an extinct genus of beaked whale (family Ziphiidae) known from the Early Pliocene. The genus contains two species: the type species, Pterocetus benguelae, named in 2007, and a second species, Pterocetus diamantinae, named in 2026. Both are known from partial skulls collected from the seafloor. Fossils of P. benguelae were trawled from the Atlantic Ocean near Saldanha Bay on the west coast of South Africa. Fossils of P. diamantinae were collected from the a depth of 7 kilometres (4.3 mi) in the Diamantina fracture zone of the Indian Ocean, west of Cape Lewin, Australia.
