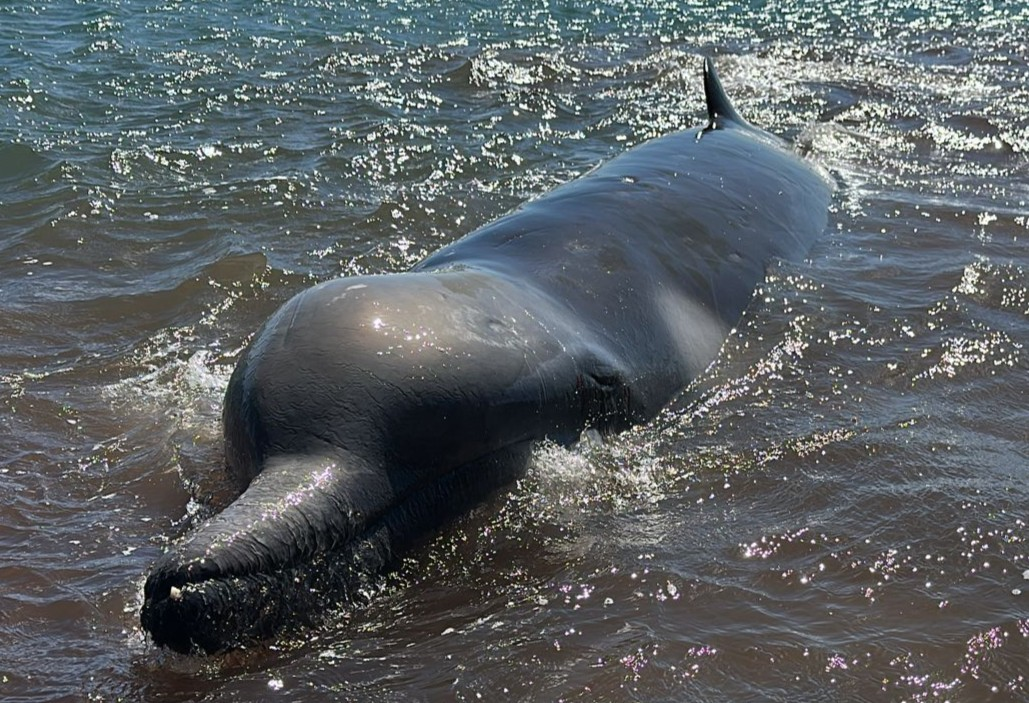
- An adult male that stranded in Auckland, New Zealand in March of 2026.
- Size compared to an average human

Conservation status
- Data Deficient (IUCN 3.1)
- CITES Appendix II

Scientific classification
- Kingdom: Animalia
- Phylum: Chordata
- Class: Mammalia
- Order: Artiodactyla
- Infraorder: Cetacea
- Family: Ziphiidae
- Genus: Tasmacetus; Oliver, 1937
- Species: T. shepherdi

Binomial name
- Tasmacetus shepherdi Oliver, 1937
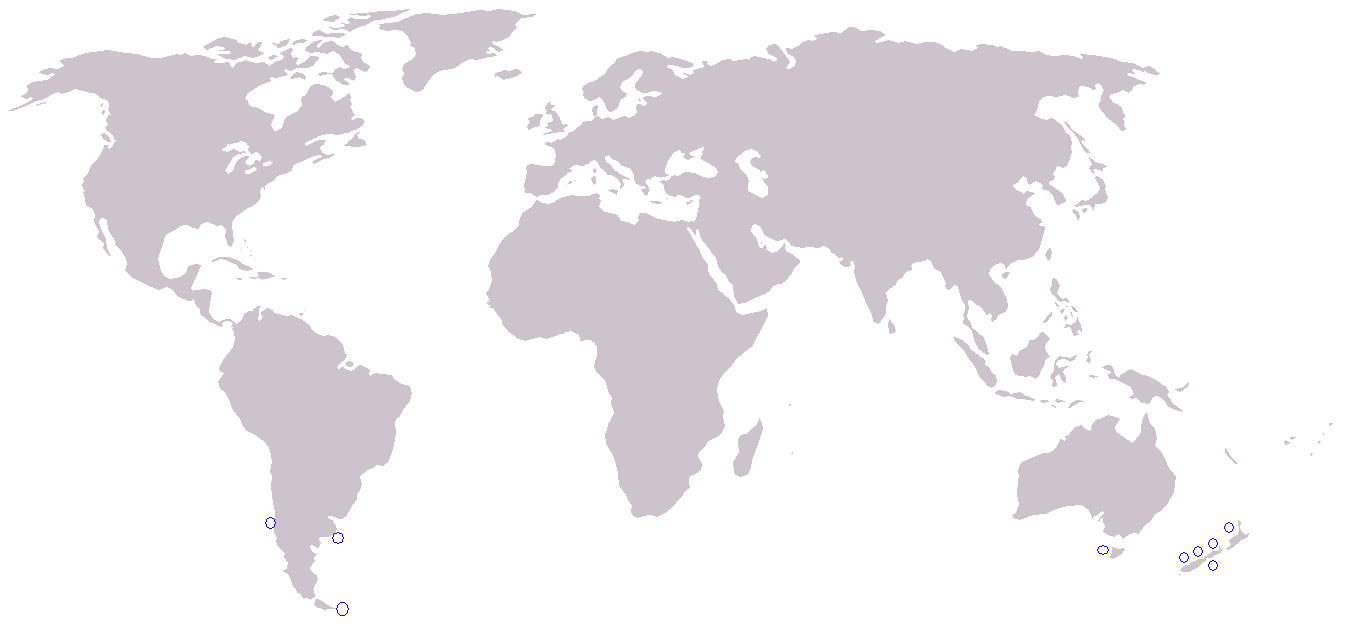
- Shepherd's beaked whale range

= Shepherd's beaked whale =

Species of mammal

Shepherd's beaked whale (Tasmacetus shepherdi), also commonly called Tasman's beaked whale or simply the Tasman whale, is a cetacean of the family Ziphiidae and the only species in the genus Tasmacetus. The whale has not been studied extensively. Only four confirmed at sea sightings have been made and 42 strandings recorded (as of 2006). It was first known to science in 1937, being named by W. R. B. Oliver after George Shepherd, curator of the Wanganui Museum, who collected the type specimen near Ohawe on the south Taranaki coast of New Zealand's North Island, in 1933.

== Description ==
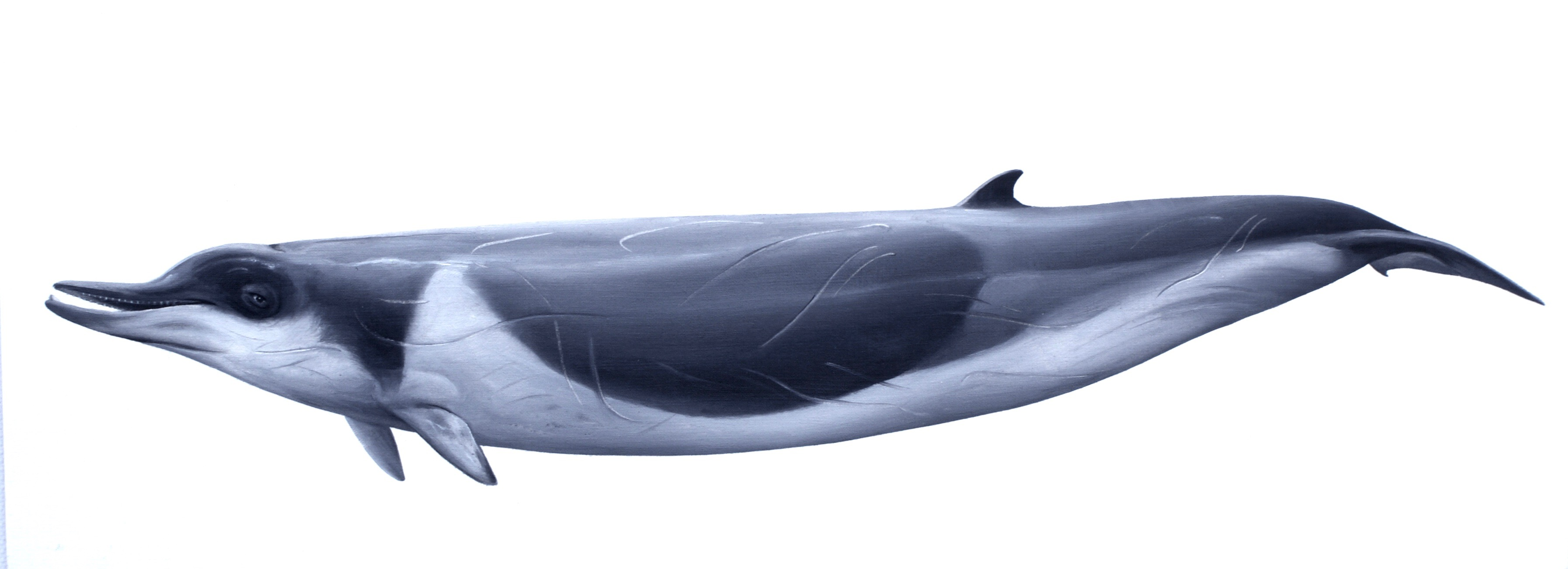
Illustration depicting the morphology and coloration of a typical adult.

Adults can reach lengths of 6 m (20 ft) to 7.1 m (23 ft) and weigh about 2.32 to 3.48 tons. At birth they may be about 3 m (9.8 ft) long. The longest recorded lengths were 7 m (23 ft) for a male and 6.6 m (22 ft) for a female.

They are robust and large-bodied for beaked whales, having a bluff melon and a long, dolphin-like beak.

It is the only species of ziphiid with a full set of functional teeth (17 to 27 pairs in both the upper and lower jaws). Adult males also have a pair of tusks at the tip of the lower jaw.

They are dark brown dorsally and cream-colored ventrally, with a pale blaze extending up from the flipper and another pale area extending as a swathe on the posterior flank. The tall, falcate dorsal fin is set about two-thirds the way along the back. The width of the blaze varies for each individual, similar to the saddle patches of killer whales, which could also be useful for individual-level recognition.

== Population and distribution ==
Sightings and stranding records indicate that the species has a circumpolar distribution in southern hemisphere. No population estimates exist for Shepherd's beaked whale. As of 2006, there have been about 42 stranding records of the species from New Zealand (including the Chatham Islands, 24), Argentina (7), Tristan da Cunha (6), Australia (3), and the Juan Fernández Islands (2). The northernmost record was at Shark Bay in Western Australia in 2008. There have been five unconfirmed sightings (mostly from New Zealand), as well as a "probable" sighting near Shag Rocks and four confirmed sightings—the first two confirmed sightings occurred in 1985, within a few minutes of each other, off the Tristan da Cunha group (first sighting at 37°18′S 12°32′W); the third in 2002 near Gough Island (40°19′S 9°53′W); and the fourth in 2004 south of Tasmania (48°50′S 150°06′E). In January 2012, a group of up to a dozen of this species were photographed and filmed by the Australian Antarctic Division south of Portland, Victoria.

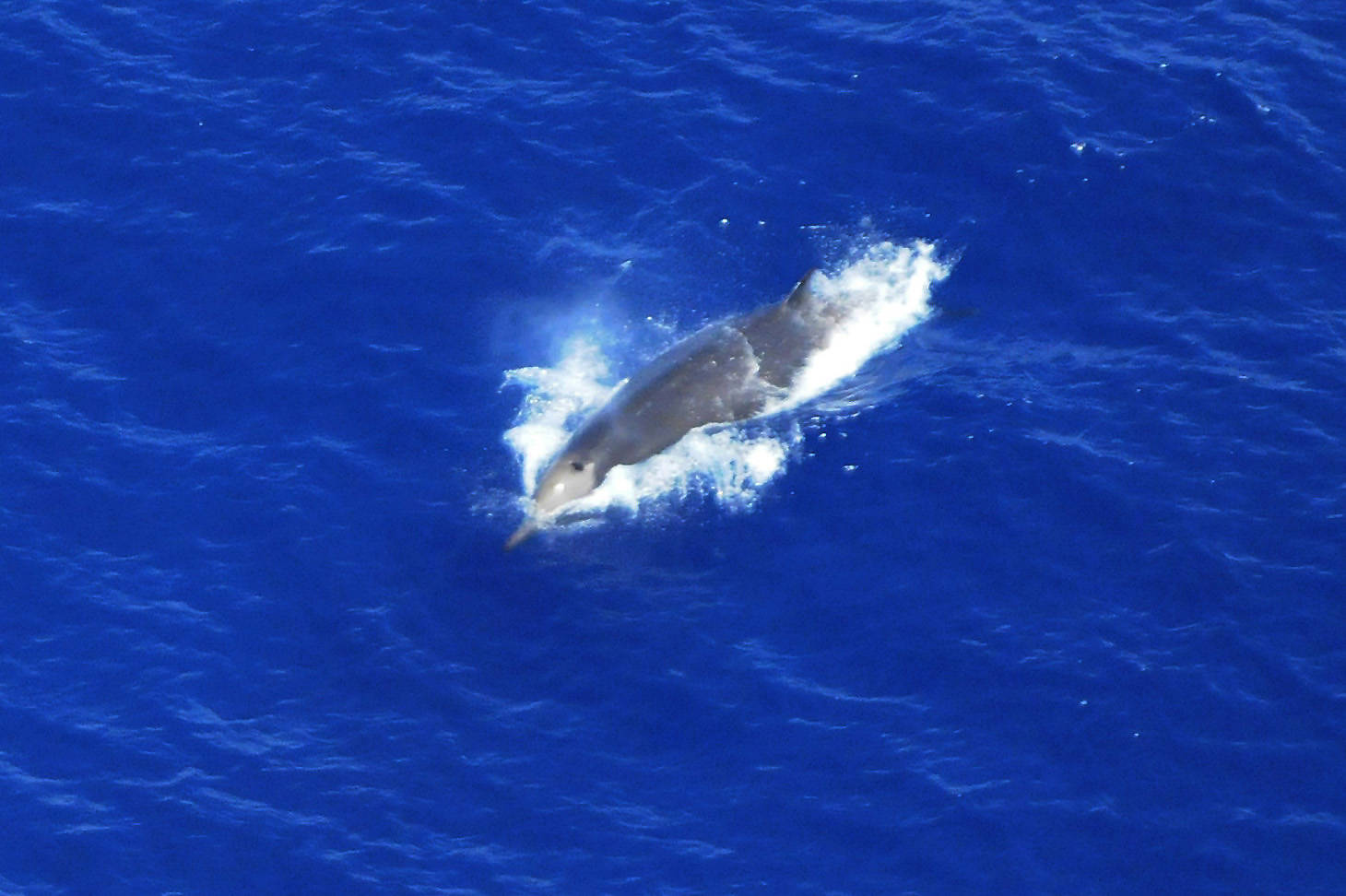
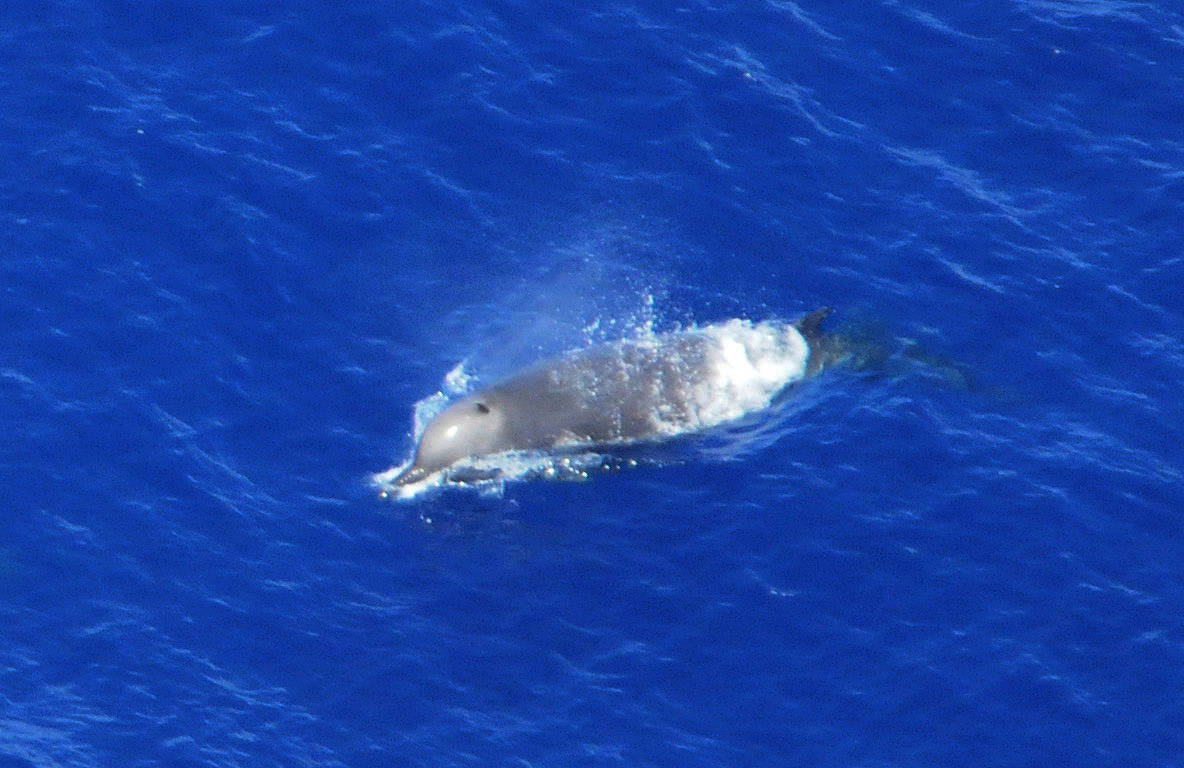
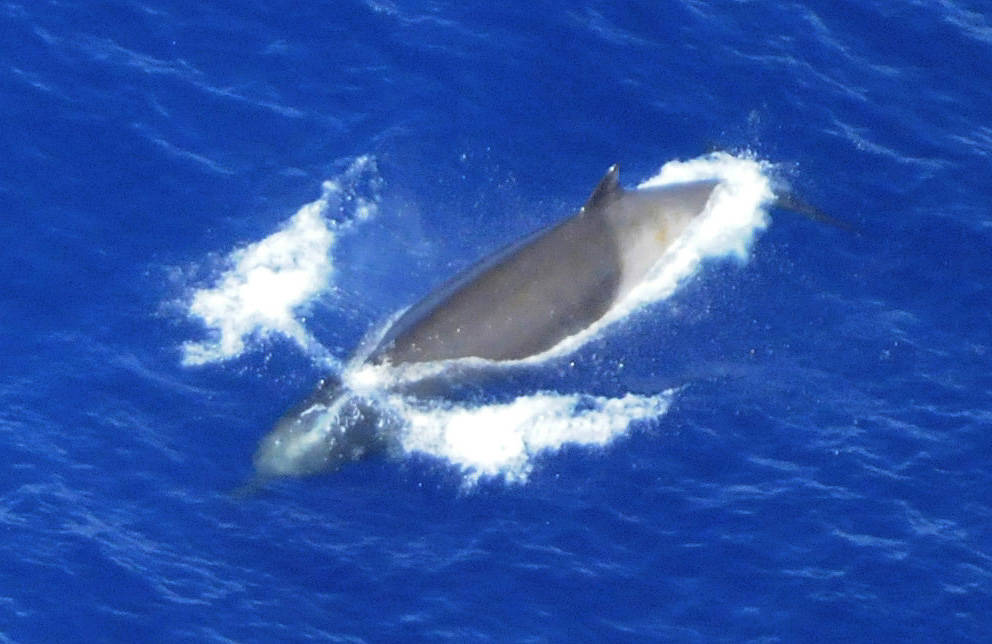
An adult photographed surfacing aerially in the Great Australian Bight (2012)

Multiple sightings of the species have been reported from Otago submarine canyons off Otago coast, New Zealand. Sightings have been recorded throughout the year with vocalization recordings, suggesting regular presences there. These include at least two sightings in 2016 which were the first confirmed sightings within New Zealand waters, followed by four sightings in 2017, one or more sighting(s) in 2018, one sighting in 2019, four or five sightings in 2021, five sightings in 2022 including a pod of 15-20 animals.

There have been additional sightings from other parts of New Zealand, such as off Gisborne, several sightings off Kaikōura, off Fiordland, Taranaki, and so on. The species is seldom seen because of its deep, offshore distribution in waters where sighting conditions can be difficult (the "Roaring Forties" and "Furious Fifties").

== Behaviour ==
=== Social behavior ===
Four of the confirmed sightings of this species involved three to six individuals (one group included a calf) in waters from 350 m (1,150 ft) to 3,600 m (11,800 ft) deep, while a 2012 sighting involved as many as ten to twelve individuals. The animals surfaced several times, before arching to dive. Some were observed to come to the surface at a steep angle like many other ziphiids, raising their head and beaks out of the water. The Shepherd's beaked whale's blow could be observed with the naked eye at a distance of up to 1,000 m (3,300 ft), within a bushy plume that is relatively tall for a ziphiid varying from 1 to 2 m (3.3 to 6.6 ft) in height. Males tend to have light, linear scarring on their bodies. These are suggested to be the result of fighting with other males with their apical teeth or other unknown social behaviors within a pod.

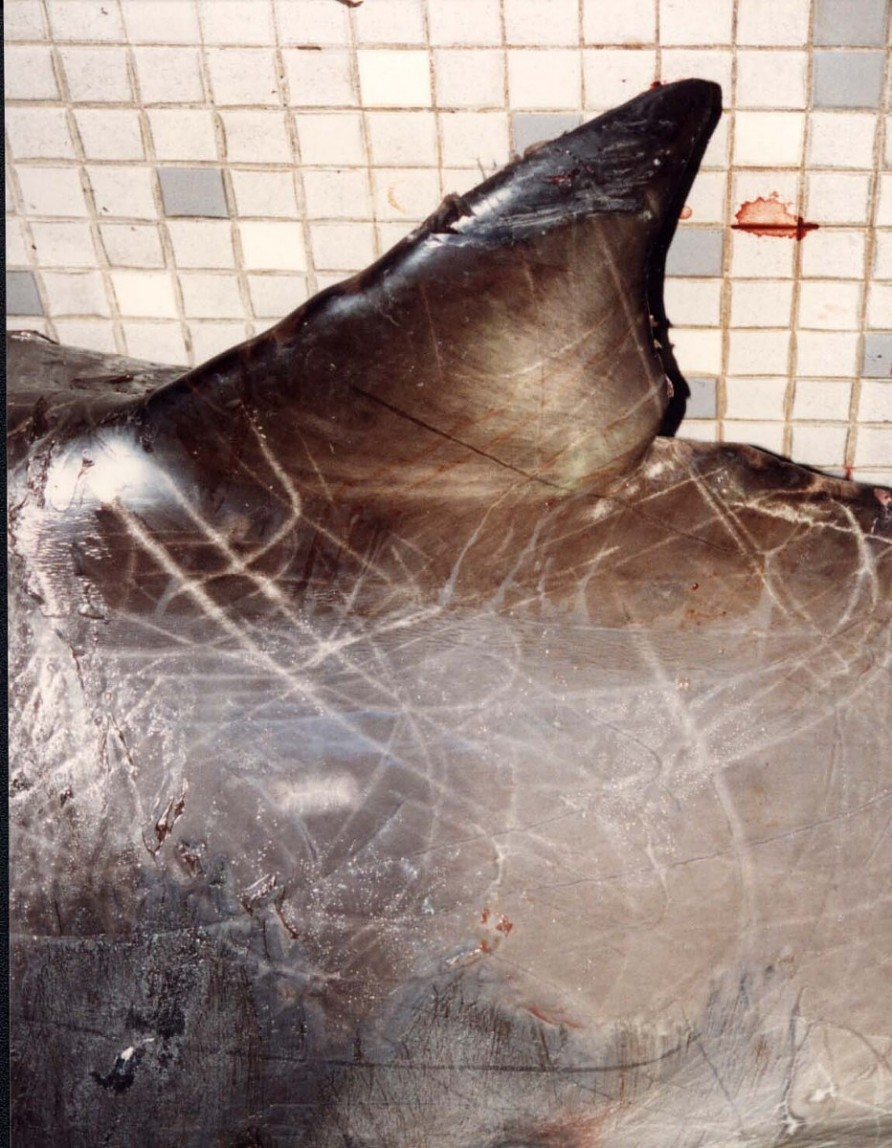
Dorsal fin region of a male showing extensive scarring, likely caused by aggression with other males.

=== Food and foraging ===
Like other beaked whales, Shepherd’s beaked whales possess a pair of V-shaped throat grooves that are thought to facilitate suction feeding by creating negative pressure within the mouth as the tongue retracts and the throat grooves expand, powerfully drawing prey inward like a biological vacuum. They are presumed to use echolocation to locate prey and may also use vision at close range, particularly when targeting bioluminescent species. However, their unusual full set of functional teeth may also be advantageous in capturing fish, which constitute a substantial portion of their diet.

Shepherd's beaked whales appear to have a very diverse diet composed of both fish and squid, rather than feeding primarily on squid like many other beaked whales. Analyses of stomach contents revealed cephalopod taxa such as Histioteuthis atlantica, Stigmatoteuthis dofleini, Todarodes filippovae, Ancistrocheirus lesueurii, Taningia danae, Octopoteuthis sp., Teuthowenia pellucida, Ommastrephes bartramii, Pholidoteuthis sp., Lycoteuthis lorigera, Mastigoteuthis sp., and Brachioteuthis picta; recorded fish taxa include Argentine hake, serranids, Brotula sp., orange roughy, splendid alfonsino, mirrorbelly, eelpout, grenadiers, monkfish, Neobythites, and lanternfish (Symbolophorus sp., Diaphus sp.). Other prey, such as crabs (Peltarion spinulosum), have been recorded.

The species may vary its foraging strategy spatially or temporally in response to prey movements and habitat use. Several prey species, including splendid alfonsino and squid such as Stigmatoteuthis dofleini and Taningia danae undergo diel vertical migrations, occupying deeper waters during the day and rising toward shallower depths at night. This may indicate that the whales shift between slope, seamount, and more oceanic habitats to exploit prey concentrations at different depths and times.

=== Diving behavior ===
These whales are presumed to feed at depths greater than 500 m. Dives of 5-15 minutes have been recorded. Time surfacing has been recorded as intervals of 4-17 minutes with constant blowing. Individuals within a pod typically surface and dive together.

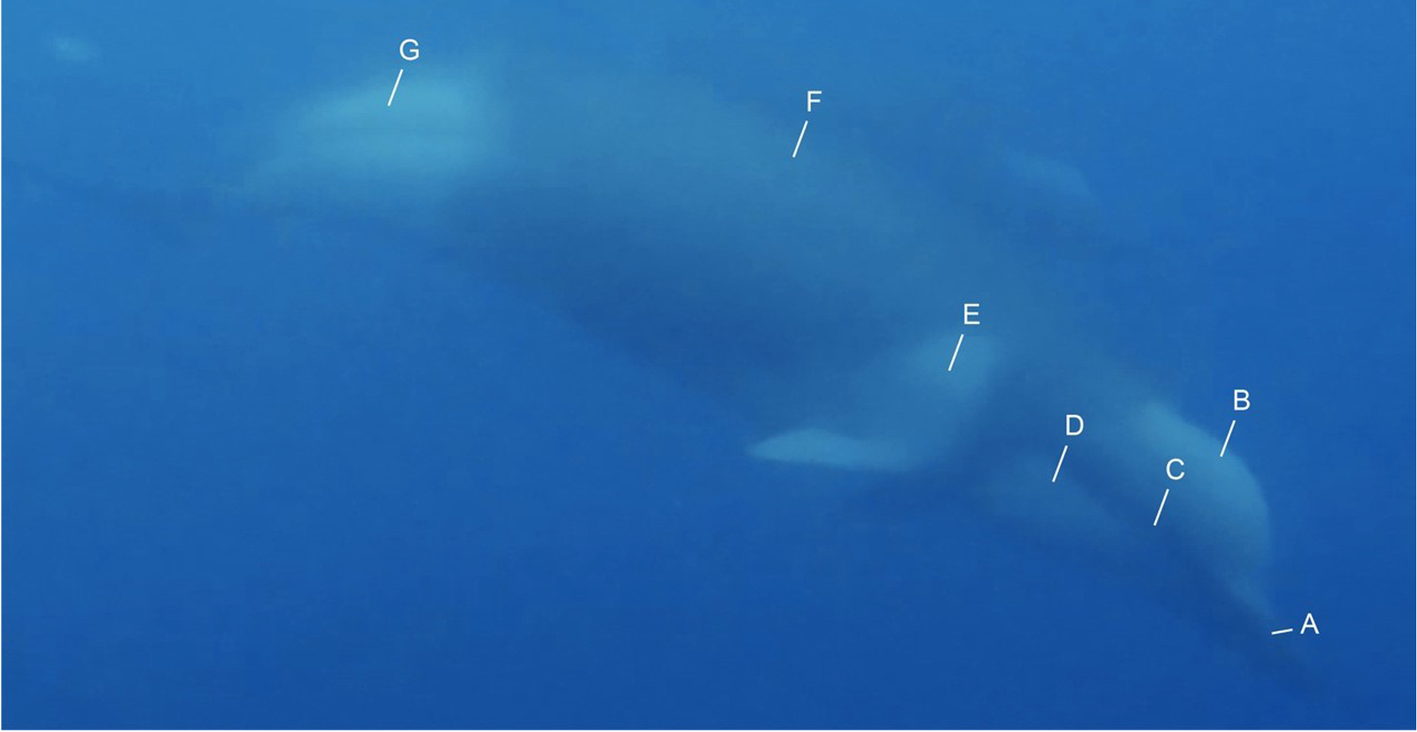
First underwater sighting of live Shepherd's beaked whales, near Inaccessible Island, Tristan da Cunha, January 2017.

=== Vocal behavior ===
A recent study found Shepherd's beaked whale to produce a variety of ultrasonic pulses used in echolocation. Like other beaked whales, these high-frequency clicks are thought to assist in navigation and prey detection during deep dives, and the frequency-modulated upsweep pulses may be unique to this species.

=== Predators ===
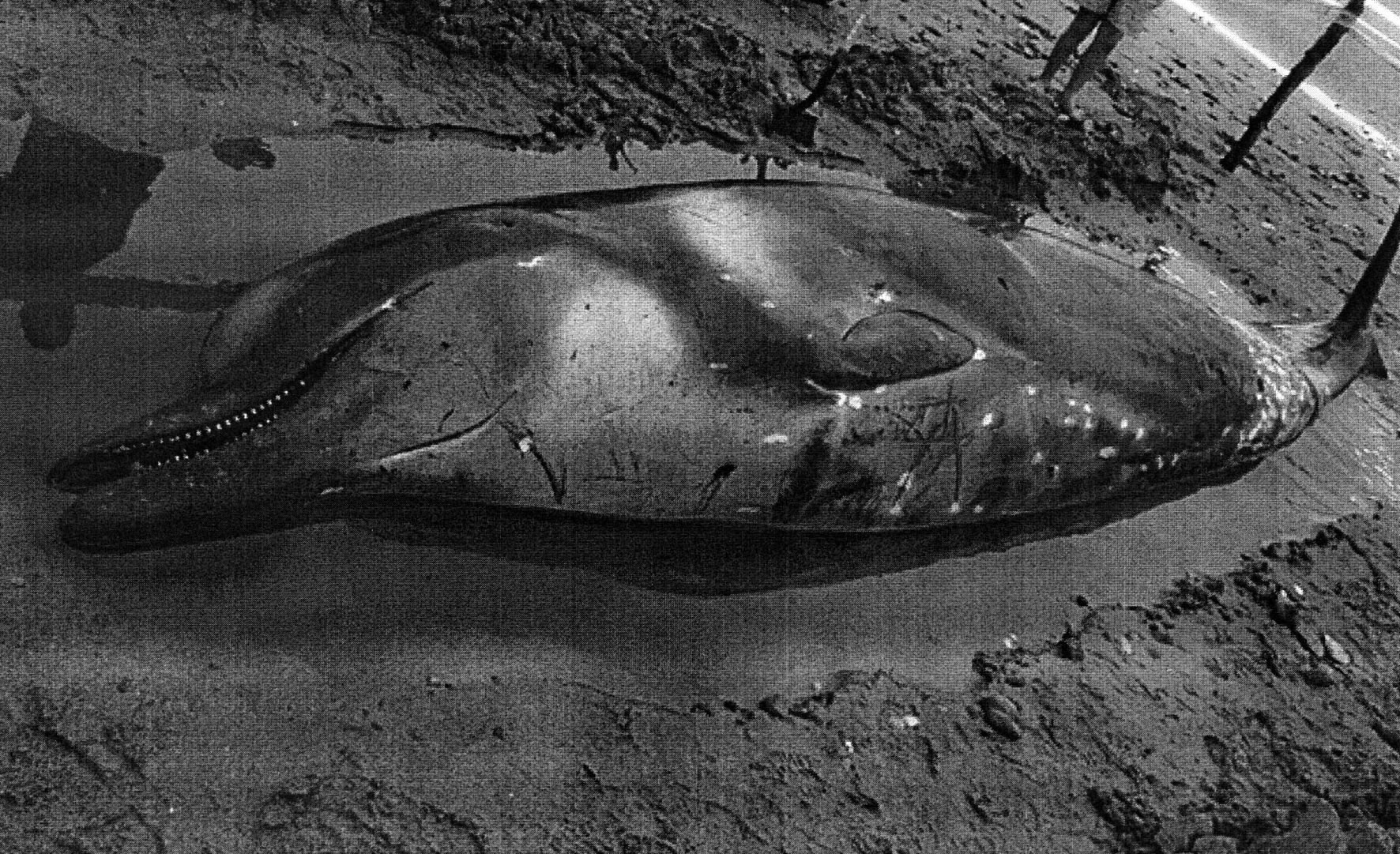
A stranded adult male photographed in New Zealand bearing numerous cookiecuttershark wounds, most concentrated on the ventral surface, especially around the genital area.

Killer whales and large sharks may prey on Shepherd's beaked whales. There have also been unconfirmed reports of kleptoparasitic interactions with killer whales. Some individuals have been observed with healed wounds from cookiecutter sharks.

== Conservation ==
There are no reports of this species being hunted or killed accidentally by humans. Shepherd's beaked whale is covered by the Memorandum of Understanding for the Conservation of Cetaceans and Their Habitats in the Pacific Islands Region (Pacific Cetaceans MOU). Plastic debris and longline hooks have been found in the stomachs and intestines of some individuals, which could lead to internal trauma or starvation if the material blocks their digestive tracts.

== Taxonomy ==
Recent molecular evidence suggests that this species diverged after the most basal extant ziphiid genus, Berardius, and prior to Ziphius.

== Popular culture ==
The species was featured on a 45p commemorative stamp issued by Tristan da Cunha in 2019 as part of a set celebrating different species of whale.

== See also ==
- List of cetaceans

== Sources ==
1. Shepherd's beaked whale in the Encyclopedia of Marine Mammals Thomas A. Jefferson, 1998. ISBN 0-12-551340-2
2. Whales, Dolphins and Porpoises Carwardine, 1995. ISBN 0-7513-2781-6
