= Globicetus =

Scientific classification
- Domain: Eukaryota
- Kingdom: Animalia
- Phylum: Chordata
- Class: Mammalia
- Order: Artiodactyla
- Infraorder: Cetacea
- Family: Ziphiidae
- Genus: †Globicetus; Bianucci et al. 2013
- Species: †G. hiberus

Binomial name
- †Globicetus hiberus Bianucci et al. 2013

Extinct genus of mammals

Globicetus is an extinct genus of ziphiidae cetaceans, with one species, G. hiberus, from the Miocene of Portugal and Spain. The holotype is a skull in the Museu da Lourinhã, in Portugal. G. hiberus is notable for having a large, spherical mass of bone on its rostrum.
