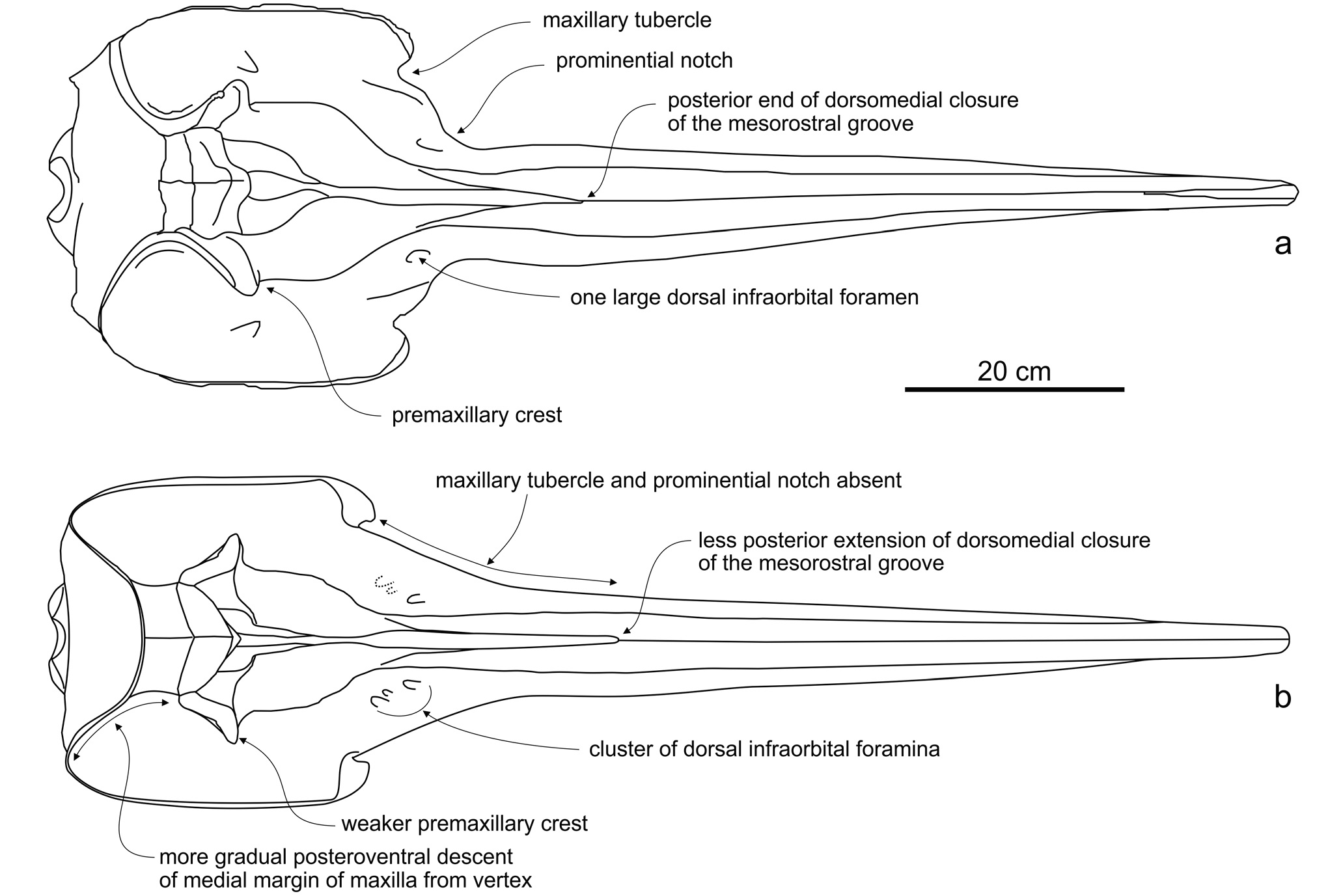
- M. gregarius and M. longirostris cranial diagrams

Scientific classification
- Kingdom: Animalia
- Phylum: Chordata
- Class: Mammalia
- Order: Artiodactyla
- Infraorder: Cetacea
- Family: Ziphiidae
- Genus: †Messapicetus; Bianucci & Landini, 1992

= Messapicetus =

Messapicetus Temporal range: Tortonian

Extinct genus of beaked whale

Messapicetus is an extinct genus of beaked whale from the Late Miocene. It currently holds two species, M. longirostris from the Tortonian of Italy and M. gregarius from the Pisco Formation of Peru. However, a third unnamed species is represented in the St. Marys Formation of Maryland known from fragmentary material. M. gregarius is sexually dimorphic, males having tusks which are hypothesized to have been used in intraspecific combat for mates as in extant (living) beaked whales. Messapicetus reached a body length of about 4.1–4.5 meters (13–15 ft) and weighed 1.8 metric tons (2.0 short tons).

== Research history ==
During the late 1980's and early 1990's, a large amount of fossil cetacean material was recovered from quarries in the Pietra leccese ("Lecce stone") of the Italian Salento Peninsula. These expeditions, along with the recovery of the fossil material, were carried out by the local Gruppo Naturalisti Salentini of Lecce. The holotype specimen of Messapicetus, MAUS 240, consists of a nearly complete skull and is housed at the Museum of the Environment at the University of Salento. The holotype material was recovered from the Cisterna quarry near Cavallino. The specimen was described in collaboration with the Department of Earth Sciences at the University of Pisa. A preliminary description of Messapicetus longirostris was first published in a note by Giovanni Bianucci, Walter Landini and Angelo Varola in 1992, with a detailed description by the same authors following two years later in 1994.

More material was assigned to the genus in 2007, this time from the Calvert Cliffs of Maryland. These stretch some 50 kilometres along the western shore of Chesapeake Bay, and contain sediments from three distinct fossiliferous formations that were deposited during the Miocene. The fossil material assigned to Messapicetus was recovered from the Little Cove Point Member of the St. Marys Formation, which dates to the Tortonian stage of the Late Miocene, between 9 and 10 million years ago. The specimen, CMM-V-3138, is housed at the Calvert Marine Museum and consists of a partial rostrum. The study considered the material different enough from M. longirostris as not to assign the material to the species, but similar enough to assign it at the genus level.

A 2010 paper by Bianucci, Olivier Lambert and Klaas Post described multiple exceptionally preserved ziphiid specimens from the Pisco Formation of Peru. The specimens were found in sediments from the base of the formation, representing shallow and lagoonal waters dating to the Middle Miocene, approximately 12-14 million years ago. The authors coined a new species based on the recovered material: M. gregarius. The type specimen consists of a near-complete skull and mandible: a further eight referred specimens from two distinct sites consist of skulls of various levels of preservation quality and completeness. All are housed at the Museum of Natural History of the National University of San Marcos (MUSM) in Lima, Peru. Even though some material had to be left in the field due to its fragmentary nature, this wealth of fossils made Messapicetus "the best-known fossil beaked whale".

In 2016, Bianucci and colleagues described a new specimen which they referred to the type species M. longirostris. This specimen was found in the same quarry as the type, 50 meters away and 4 meters lower, with the section of the quarry containing both specimens being dated to the 'Neogloboquadrina acostaensis zone' of the Middle Tortonian (10.5-8.14 Ma). The specimen was originally found in 1987 by Angelo Varola, one of the authors of the description, during monitoring conducted in collaboration with the University of Pisa. Accordingly, the fossil is kept at the Natural History Museum of the University of Pisa, under specimen label MSNUP I15760. The specimen represents a single—likely immature—individual, and consists of an incomplete skull, fragments of the mandibles and shoulder blade, a deformed vertebral centrum and teeth.

Two additional specimens referred to M. gregarius were found in the Cerro Colorado member of the Pisco Formation (9.9-8.9 Ma, Tortonian), and described by Benjamin Ramassamy and colleagues in 2018. Both of these are housed at the MUSM, with specimen MUSM 2542 consisting of parts of the forelimbs and MUSM 2548 consisting of numerous vertebrae, ribs of varying levels of intactness and parts of the sternum. For both specimens, additional elements, including the skull, were not recovered, and these were noted as still being in the field. Shortly after, Bianucci and colleagues described an incomplete Messapicetus skull in a 2019 paper. The specimen was found in blocks extracted from lower Tortonian limestones on the Spanish island of Menorca, and is referred to M. cf. longirostris, indicating a degree of uncertainty in the referral. It is held at the Museu Diocesà de Menorca under specimen number MDM-2029.

=== Etymology ===
The generic name Messapicetus comes from Messapia, the ancient name of the Salento Peninsula, and from the name of the order Cetacea. The specific name of the type species M. longirostris refers to the elongated rostrum of the holotype skull. M. gregarius was named for the high concentration of individuals found in relatively few outcrops, represented through the use of the Latin gregarius.
