= Tusciziphius =

Tusciziphius Temporal range: Early Miocene–Early Pliocene

Scientific classification
- Kingdom: Animalia
- Phylum: Chordata
- Class: Mammalia
- Infraclass: Placentalia
- Order: Artiodactyla
- Infraorder: Cetacea
- Family: Ziphiidae
- Genus: †Tusciziphius; Bianucci, 1997

Type species
- †T. crispus Bianucci, 1997

Other Species
- †T. atlanticus Bianucci et al., 2013

Extinct genus of mammals

Tusciziphius is an extinct genus of ziphiid cetaceans. The distribution includes the Miocene of Portugal and Spain, and the Pliocene of Italy and the United States. Two species are known: T. atlanticus and T. crispus. The type specimen of T. crispus is IGF 1534, 1536, 1537, 1569, 1570, 1572, 1594 V, a partial skeleton (cerebral portion of a skull associated with the left tympanic and fragment of posterior portion of left mandibular ramus, fragment of hyoid, vertebrae, and ribs). The type locality is Case il Poggio, which is in a Zanclean coastal sandstone/claystone in Italy.
