= Imocetus =

Scientific classification
- Kingdom: Animalia
- Phylum: Chordata
- Class: Mammalia
- Infraclass: Placentalia
- Order: Artiodactyla
- Infraorder: Cetacea
- Family: Ziphiidae
- Genus: †Imocetus; Bianucci et al. 2013

Extinct genus of mammals

Imocetus is an extinct genus of ziphiid cetaceans, with one species, I. piscatus, from the Miocene of Portugal and Spain. The etymology is after imum that means "ocean floor", and cetus that means "whale". Piscatus means "fished". The type specimen is at Museu da Lourinhã.
