= Beneziphius =

Scientific classification
- Domain: Eukaryota
- Kingdom: Animalia
- Phylum: Chordata
- Class: Mammalia
- Order: Artiodactyla
- Suborder: Whippomorpha
- Infraorder: Cetacea
- Family: Ziphiidae
- Genus: †Beneziphius; Lambert, 2005

Species
- B. brevirostris Lambert, 2005 (type); B. cetariensis Mijan et al., 2017

Extinct genus of mammals

Beneziphius is an extinct genus of ziphiid cetacean known from late Miocene to Pliocene marine deposits in Belgium and fishing grounds off Spain. The genus name honors Pierre-Joseph van Beneden, who pioneered the study of Neogene marine mammals from Belgium.

== Taxonomy ==
Two species are known, B. brevirostris and B. cetariensis. Beneziphius differs from other primitive beaked whales ("Messapicetus clade" sensu Bianucci et al. 2016) in having ankylosed thickened premaxillae dorsally roofing the mesorostral groove for most of its length. The two species of Beneziphius differ from each other in their size, rostral length, premaxillary length, and features of the premaxillary sac fossa.
