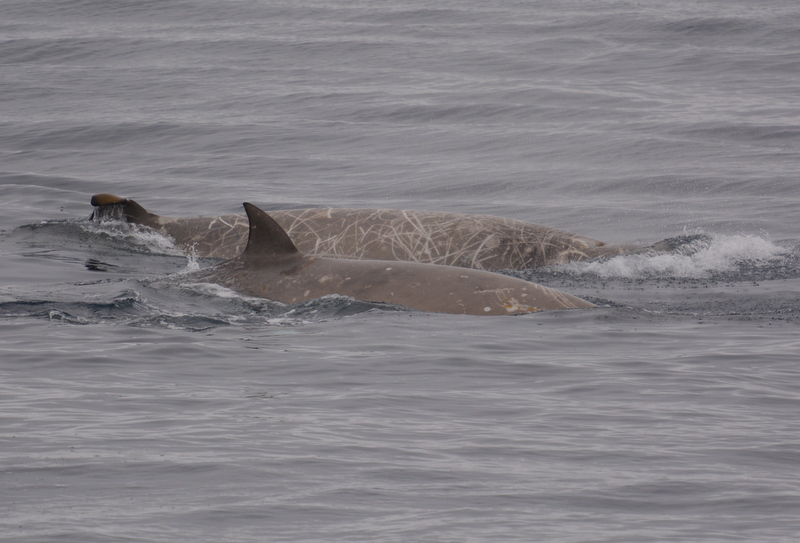
- Southern bottlenose whale

Scientific classification
- Kingdom: Animalia
- Phylum: Chordata
- Class: Mammalia
- Order: Artiodactyla
- Infraorder: Cetacea
- Family: Ziphiidae
- Subfamily: Hyperoodontinae
- Genus: Hyperoodon; Lacépède, 1804

Type species
- Hyperoodon butskopf Lacépède, 1804

Species
- H. ampullatus; H. planifrons

= Bottlenose whale =

Bottlenose whales Temporal range: Miocene-recent

Genus of mammals

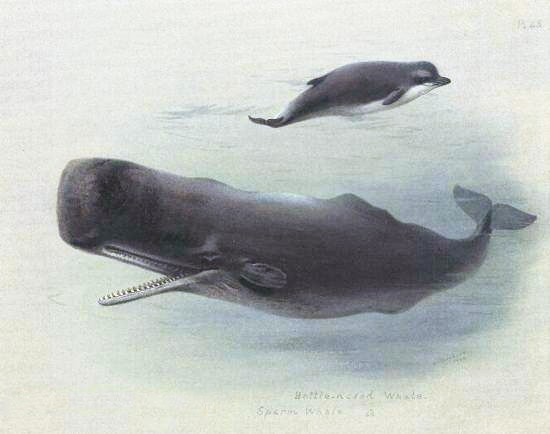
A bottlenose whale pictured above a sperm whale.

Hyperoodon (or Hyperoödon) is a genus of beaked whale, containing just two species: the Northern and Southern bottlenose whales. While not in the genus Hyperoodon, Longman's beaked whales are alternatively called tropical bottlenose whales due to their physical features resembling those of bottlenose whales.

They are considered to be molluscivorous, eating mainly squid.
