= Ash Hollow Formation =

Geologic formation in Nebraska

Coordinates: 41°17′53″N 102°07′12″W

- Stratigraphic range: Neogene
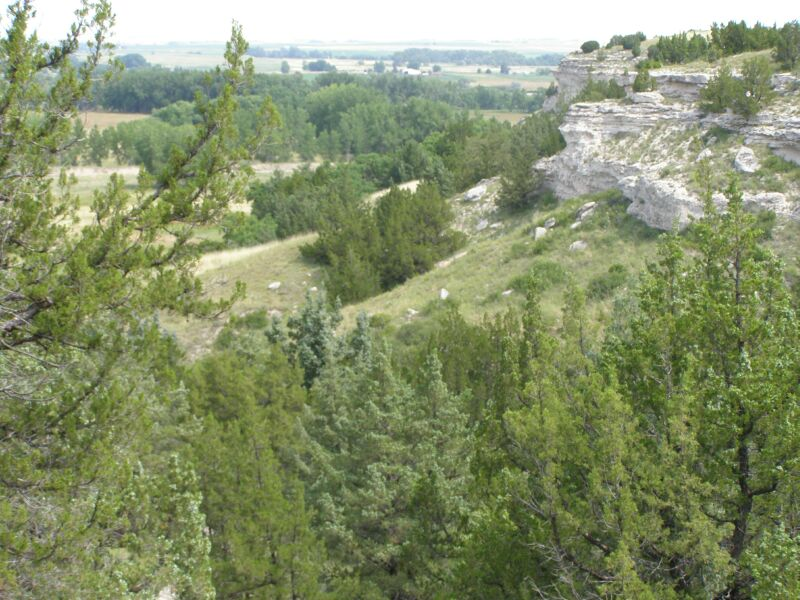
- Ash Hollow Formation in Nebraska
- Type: Geological formation
- Unit of: Ogallala Group

Location
- Region: Nebraska, South Dakota
- Country: United States

The Ash Hollow Formation of the Ogallala Group is a geological formation found in Nebraska and South Dakota. It preserves fossils dating back to the Neogene period. It was named after Ash Hollow, Nebraska and can be seen in Ash Hollow State Historical Park. Ashfall Fossil Beds State Historical Park is within this formation.

== Fossil content ==
Color key: Taxon / Reclassified taxon / Taxon falsely reported as present / Dubious taxon or junior synonym / Ichnotaxon / Ootaxon / Morphotaxon	Notes; Uncertain or tentative taxa are in small text; ~~crossed out~~ taxa are discredited.

=== Mammals ===
==== Bats ====
Bats reported from the Ash Hollow Formation
Genus	Species	Location	Stratigraphic position	Material	Notes	Images
Lasiurus	L. sp. indet.	Pratt Slide, Brown County, Nebraska.	Merritt Dam Member.	Distal portion of a left humerus (UNSM 100140).	A hairy-tailed bat.	
Myotis	M. sp. indet.	Ashfall Fossil Beds.	Cap Rock Member.	A right dentary (UNSM 27898).	A mouse-eared bat.	

==== Carnivorans ====
Carnivorans reported from the Ash Hollow Formation
Genus	Species	Location	Stratigraphic position	Material	Notes	Images
Aelurodon	A. taxoides	Brown, Cherry, Keyapaha, Knox, Sheridan, Hitchcock & Banner counties, Nebraska.	Cap Rock & Merritt Dam Members.	Abundant remains.	A borophagine dog.	
Barbourofelis	B. fricki	Channel deposits resting on upper part of the formation.			A barbourofelid.	
Barbourofelis	B. morrisi	Cherry County, Nebraska.	Channel deposit resting unconformably on the Cap Rock Member.	Skull (F:AM 79999) and right ramus (F:AM 80000).	A barbourofelid.	
Barbourofelis	?B. whitfordi	Brown County, Nebraska.	Lower part of the formation.	Right ramus (UNSM 25546).	A barbourofelid.	
Carpocyon	C. robustus	Brown & Cherry counties, Nebraska.	Merritt Dam Member.	Skull elements.	A borophagine dog.	
Epicyon	E. haydeni	Brown, Cherry, Keith and Sheridan counties, Nebraska.	Merritt Dam Member.	Multiple specimens.	A borophagine dog.	
Epicyon	E. saevus	Brown, Cherry, Antelope & Keith counties, Nebraska.	Cap Rock & Merritt Dam members.	Multiple specimens.	A borophagine dog.	
Eucyon?	E.? skinneri	Hans Johnson Quarry, Cherry County, Nebraska.	Merritt Dam Member.	Partial mandible (F:AM 25143).	A canine dog.	
Ischyrocyon	I. gidleyi	Cherry & Keyapaha counties, Nebraska; Todd, Bennett & Mellette counties, South Dakota.	Cap Rock Member.		A bear-dog.	
Leptarctus	L. wortmani	Nebraska & South Dakota.		Many undescribed specimens.	A mustelid.	
Leptocyon	L. matthewi	Cherry, Brown & Antelope counties, Nebraska.	Merritt Dam & Cap Rock members.	Skull and limb elements.	A canine dog.	
Metalopex	M. merriami	Frontier County, Nebraska.		Premaxilla, maxilla and ramus fragments.	A fox.	
Paratomarctus	P. euthos	Brown & Cherry counties, Nebraska, & Todd County, South Dakota.	Cap Rock & Merritt Dam members.	Numerous specimens.	A borophagine dog.	
Pseudocyon	P. sp.	Brown & Cherry counties, Nebraska.	Cap Rock & Merritt Dam members.		A bear-dog.	
Vulpes	V. stenognathus	Frontier County, Nebraska.		Left molar (UNSM 26136).	A fox.	

==== Eulipotyphlans ====
Eulipotyphlans reported from the Ash Hollow Formation
Genus	Species	Location	Stratigraphic position	Material	Notes	Images
Achlyoscapter	A. sp.	Lemoyne Quarry, Keith County, Nebraska.		A right ramal fragment (UW 6670).	A talpine mole.	
Alluvisorex	A. sp., cf. A. arcadentes	Lemoyne Quarry, Keith County, Nebraska.		UW 6734, 6735 & 7722; UNSM 27515.	A shrew.	
Anouroneomys	A. magnus	Lemoyne Quarry, Keith County, Nebraska.			A shrew.	
Lemoynea	L. biradicularis	Lemoyne Quarry, Keith County, Nebraska.			A desmanine mole.	
Limnoecus	cf. L. sp.	Lemoyne Quarry, Keith County, Nebraska.		UW 6708 & 6739.	A medium-sized shrew.	
Sorex	S. edwardsi	Lemoyne Quarry, Keith County, Nebraska.			A medium-sized shrew.	
Sorex	S. yatkolai	Lemoyne Quarry, Keith County, Nebraska.		UW 6731 (fragment of left ramus), 6732 & 6733.	A diminuitive shrew.	
Sorex	S. sp.	Lemoyne Quarry, Keith County, Nebraska.		UW 6736, 6737 & 6738.	Probably a new species of shrew, larger than S. edwardsi.	
Talpinae	Undetermined genus & species 1	Lemoyne Quarry, Keith County, Nebraska.		2 teeth (UW 6671 & 10527).	A mole.	
Talpinae	Undetermined genus & species 2	Lemoyne Quarry, Keith County, Nebraska.		Teeth (UW 10521, 10522, 10523, 10524, 10525 & 10526).	A mole.	
Talpinae	Undetermined genus & species 3	Lemoyne Quarry, Keith County, Nebraska.		An isolated right molar (UW 6675).	A mole.	

==== Lagomorphs ====
Lagomorphs reported from the Ash Hollow Formation
Genus	Species	Location	Stratigraphic position	Material	Notes	Images
Alilepus	A. sp.	Pratt Quarry, Brown County, Nebraska.	Merritt Dam Member.	Mandible and teeth.	A leporid.	
Hesperolagomys	H. sp., cf. H. galbreathi	Pratt Quarry, Brown County, Nebraska.	Merritt Dam Member.	A premolar (UNSM 101709).	A pika.	
Hypolagus	H. cf. H. vetus	Pratt Quarry, Brown County, Nebraska.	Merritt Dam Member.	A right premolar (UNSM 101749).	A leporid.	
Pronotolagus	P. whitei	Pratt Quarry, Brown County, Nebraska.	Merritt Dam Member.	An isolated premolar (UNSM 101675).	A leporid.	
Russellagus	R. sp.	Pratt Quarry, Brown County, Nebraska.	Merritt Dam Member.	Lower molariform teeth.	A pika.	

==== Rodents ====
Rodents reported from the Ash Hollow Formation
Genus	Species	Location	Stratigraphic position	Material	Notes	Images
Ammospermophilus	A. junturensis	Pratt Quarry, Brown County, Nebraska.	Merritt Dam Member.	Mandible and teeth.	An antelope squirrel.	
Antecalomys	A. phthanus	Pratt Quarry, Brown County, Nebraska.	Merritt Dam Member.	Teeth and mandibles.	A sigmodontine, and the most common fossil cricetid from Pratt Quarry.	
Ceratogaulus	C. anecdotus	Brown County, Nebraska.	Merritt Dam & Cap Rock members.	Skulls, teeth and some postcranial remains.	A mylagaulid.	
Copemys	C. mariae	Pratt Quarry, Brown County, Nebraska.	Merritt Dam Member.	Mandibles.	A cricetid.	
Copemys	C. pisinnus	Pratt Quarry, Brown County, Nebraska.	Merritt Dam Member.	Mandibles and a maxilla.	A cricetid.	
Copemys	C. sp.	Pratt Quarry, Brown County, Nebraska.	Merritt Dam Member.	An isolated right molar (UNSM 101560).	A cricetid.	
Cupidinimus	C. prattensis	Pratt Quarry, Brown County, Nebraska.	Merritt Dam Member.	A right mandible (UNSM 101501).	A dipodomyine.	
Dipoides	D. tanneri	Pratt Quarry, Brown County, Nebraska.	Merritt Dam Member.	A little worn premolar (UNSM 101612).	A castorid.	
Eucastor	E. planus	Pratt Quarry, Brown County, Nebraska.	Merritt Dam Member.	Teeth and a partial mandible.	Reassigned to Nothodipoides.	
Hystricops	H. venustus	Pratt Quarry, Brown County, Nebraska.	Merritt Dam Member.	Teeth.	A castorid.	
Lignimus	L. sp.	Pratt Quarry, Brown County, Nebraska.	Merritt Dam Member.	Teeth and mandible.	A possible harrymyine.	
Megasminthus	M. sp. indeterminate	Pratt Quarry, Brown County, Nebraska.	Merritt Dam Member.	Maxillae.	A jumping mouse.	
Mioheteromys	M. sp., cf. M. agrarius	Pratt Quarry, Brown County, Nebraska.	Merritt Dam Member.	An isolated premolar (UNSM 101750) and a partial mandible with lower incisor (UNSM 101573).	A heteromyid.	
Mylagaulus	M. monodon	Pratt Quarry, Brown County, Nebraska.	Merritt Dam Member.	Teeth, mandible and limb elements.	A mylagaulid.	
Nothodipoides	N. planus	Brown County, Nebraska & Todd County, South Dakota.	Merritt Dam Member.	Teeth, partial mandible & partial skull.	A castorid.	
Perognathus	P. sp.	Antelope County, Nebraska.		Fragmentary remains within burrows.	A pocket-mouse.	
?Petauristodon	?P. sp.	Pratt Quarry, Brown County, Nebraska.	Merritt Dam Member.	A molar (UNSM 101659).	A petauristine, may represent a new species.	
Phelosaccomys	P. hibbardi	Pratt Quarry, Brown County, Nebraska.	Merritt Dam Member.	Teeth.	A possible geomyid.	
Prodipoides	P. dividerus	Nebraska.	Merritt Dam Member.		A castorid.	
Protospermophilus	P. sp., cf. P. quatalensis	Pratt Quarry, Brown County, Nebraska.	Merritt Dam Member.	An isolated molar (UNSM 101765).	A ground squirrel.	
Pseudotheridomys	cf. P. sp.	Pratt Quarry, Brown County, Nebraska.	Merritt Dam Member.	A right mandible with teeth (UNSM 101748).	An eomyid.	
Pterogaulus	P. barbarellae	Nebraska.	Merritt Dam Member.		A mylagaulid.	
cf. Sciurion	cf. S. sp.	Pratt Quarry, Brown County, Nebraska.	Merritt Dam Member.	An isolated left molar (UNSM 101769).	A flying squirrel.	
Spermophilus	S. (Otospermophilus) sp.	Pratt Quarry, Brown County, Nebraska.	Merritt Dam Member.	Teeth and jaws.	A ground squirrel.	
Tregomys	T. shotwelli	Pratt Quarry, Brown County, Nebraska.	Merritt Dam Member.	An isolated right molar (UNSM 101534).	A cricetid.	

==== Ungulates ====
Ungulates reported from the Ash Hollow Formation
Genus	Species	Location	Stratigraphic position	Material	Notes	Images
Aepycamelus	A.sp	Nebraska.	Cap Rock Member.		A Camelid.	Aepycamelus and Dromomeryx center
Calippus	C. cerasinus	Cherry County, Nebraska.	Merritt Dam Member.	Multiple specimens.	An equid.	
Calippus	C. placidus	Minnechaduza Fauna, northern Nebraska.	Cap Rock & lower Merritt Dam members.		An equid.	
Cormohipparion	C. fricki	Hollow Horn Bear Quarry, Todd County, South Dakota.		Skull elements.	An equid.	
Cormohipparion	C. matthewi	Cherry County, Nebraska.	Merritt Dam Member.	Multiple specimens.	An equid.	
Cormohipparion	C. occidentale	Cherry County, Nebraska.	Merritt Dam Member.	Numerous specimens.	An equid.	
Macrogenis	M. crassigenis	Above Burge Quarry, Brown County, Nebraska.	Merritt Dam Member.	Partial skull (F:AM AINS 467-333-1).	A peccary.	
Mckennahyus	M. parisidutrai	Cherry County, Nebraska.	Merritt Dam Member.	Skull remains.	A peccary.	
Proantilocapra	P. platycornea	Nebraska.	Cap Rock Member.		An antilocaprid.	
Pseudhipparion	P. gratum	Cherry County, Nebraska.	Cap Rock & lower Merritt Dam members.		An equid.	
Pseudhipparion	P. skinneri	Brown & Cherry counties, Nebraska.	Merritt Dam Member.	Skull elements & teeth.	An equid also known from Florida.	
Pseudoceras	P. potteri	Nebraska.	Merritt Dam Member.		Junior synonym of P. skinneri.	
Pseudoceras	P. skinneri	Nebraska.	Merritt Dam Member.	Multiple specimens.	A gelocid.	
Pseudoceras	P. wilsoni	Nebraska.	Merritt Dam Member.		Junior synonym of P. skinneri.	
Skinnerhyus	S. shermerorum	Cherry County, Nebraska.	Merritt Dam Member.	Skull remains.	A peccary.	
Tapirus	T. johnsoni	Brown (Pratt Slide), Cherry, Sheridan & Garden counties, Nebraska.	Merritt Dam Member.	Jaw elements.	A tapir.	
Teleoceras	T. major	Ashfall Fossil Beds, Nebraska.		Over 100 specimens.	A rhinoceros.	
Ustatochoerus	U. major	Cherry County, Nebraska.	Upper part of the formation.	Numerous specimens.	A merycoidodontid.	
Ustatochoerus	U. profectus		Cap Rock Member.	Numerous specimens.	A merycoidodontid.	
Ustatochoerus	U. skinneri	Cherry & Brown counties, Nebraska; Tripp County, South Dakota.		Multiple specimens.	A merycoidodontid.	

==== Proboscideans ====
Proboscideans reported from the Valentine Formation
Genus	Species	Location	Stratigraphic position	Material	Notes	Images
Amebelodon	A. fricki	Frontier & Garden counties, Nebraska.			A gomphothere.	
Eubelodon	E. morrilli		Cap rock		A gomphothere.	
Serbelodon	S. barbourensis	Cherry & Morrill counties, Nebraska.	Merrit Dam		A gomphothere.	

=== Reptiles ===
==== Birds ====
Birds reported from the Ash Hollow Formation
Genus	Species	Location	Stratigraphic position	Material	Notes	Images
Anas	A. greeni	Bennett County, South Dakota.		Distal half of a right humerus.	A teal duck originally reported as Nettion greeni.	
Anchigyps	A. voorhiesi	Near the town of Orchard, Antelope County, Nebraska.	Cap Rock Member.	Partial skeleton (UNSM 62877).	An accipitrid resembling an Old World vulture.	
Apatosagittarius	A. terrenus	Nebraska.		"A nearly complete tarsometatarsus with phalanges in place".	An accipitrid convergent with the secretarybird.	
Centuriavis	C. lioae	Nebraska.	Merritt Dam Member.	An exquisitely preserved partial skeleton.	A phasianid.	
Nettion	N. greeni	Bennett County, South Dakota.		Distal half of a right humerus.	Lumped into the genus Anas.	

==== Crocodilians ====
Crocodilians reported from the Ash Hollow Formation
Genus	Species	Location	Stratigraphic position	Material	Notes	Images
Alligator	A. mefferdi	Cherry County, Nebraska.	Upper portion of the formation.	A well-preserved skull and jaws, with some postcranial bones.	An alligator.	
Crocodilia		Antelope County, Nebraska.	Caprock Member.	2 teeth & a dermal plate.		

==== Squamates ====
Squamates reported from the Ash Hollow Formation
Genus	Species	Location	Stratigraphic position	Material	Notes	Images
Agkistrodon	cf. A. sp. indet.	Pratt Slide, Brown County, Nebraska.	Merritt Dam Member.	2 trunk vertebrae (UNSM 100283 & 100284).	A pit viper.	
Ameiseophis	A. robinsoni	Pratt Slide, Brown County, Nebraska.	Merritt Dam Member.	3 trunk vertebrae (UNSM 100266, 100267 & 100274).	A colubrine snake.	
Calamagras or Ogmophis	C. or O. sp. indet.	Pratt Slide, Brown County, Nebraska.	Merritt Dam Member.	3 trunk vertebrae (UNSM 100252, 100253 & 100259).	An erycine boa.	
Coluber or Masticophis	C. or M. sp. indet.	Pratt Slide, Brown County, Nebraska.	Merritt Dam Member.	2 trunk vertebrae (UNSM 100271 & 100273).	A colubrine snake.	
Colubridae	Subgen. incertae sedis	Pratt Slide, Brown County, Nebraska.	Merritt Dam Member.	198 vertebrae.	Snake remains unidentifiable below the family level.	
Crotalus	cf. C. sp. indet.	Pratt Slide, Brown County, Nebraska.	Merritt Dam Member.	2 trunk vertebrae (UNSM 100285 & 100291).	A rattlesnake.	
Elaphe	E. cf. E. kansensis	Pratt Slide, Brown County, Nebraska.	Merritt Dam Member.	2 trunk vertebrae (UNSM 101112).	A rat snake.	
Elaphe	E. sp. indet.	Pratt Slide, Brown County, Nebraska.	Merritt Dam Member.	6 vertebrae.	A rat snake.	
Erycinae	Gen. et. sp. indet.	Pratt Slide, Brown County, Nebraska.	Merritt Dam Member.	2 trunk vertebrae (UNSM 100255 & 100258).	An erycine boa.	
Lampropeltis	L. aff. getula	Pratt Slide, Brown County, Nebraska.	Merritt Dam Member.	3 trunk vertebrae (UNSM 100286, 100290 & 100293).	A kingsnake.	
Lampropeltis	L. similis or L. triangulum	Pratt Slide, Brown County, Nebraska.	Merritt Dam Member.	3 trunk vertebrae.	A kingsnake.	
Micronatrix	M. juliescottae	Pratt Slide, Brown County, Nebraska.	Merritt Dam Member.	4 trunk vertebrae.	A natricine snake.	
Neonatrix	N. cf. N. infera	Pratt Slide, Brown County, Nebraska.	Merritt Dam Member.	3 trunk vertebrae (UNSM 100287, 100288 & 100289).	A natricine snake.	
Nerodia	N. hillmani	Pratt Slide, Brown County, Nebraska.	Merritt Dam Member.	6 trunk vertebrae.	A natricine snake.	
Nerodia	N. sp. indet.	Pratt Slide, Brown County, Nebraska.	Merritt Dam Member.	A trunk vertebra (UNSM 101113).	A natricine snake.	
Opheodrys	cf. O. sp.	Pratt Slide, Brown County, Nebraska.	Merritt Dam Member.	A trunk vertebra (UNSM 100270).	A colubrine snake.	
Paleoheterodon or Heterodon	P. or H. sp.	Pratt Slide, Brown County, Nebraska.	Merritt Dam Member.	15 vertebrae.	A hognose snake.	
Paracoluber	P. storeri	Pratt Slide, Brown County, Nebraska.	Merritt Dam Member.	2 trunk vertebrae (UNSM 100280 & 100294).	A colubrine snake.	
Pituophis	P. sp. indet.	Pratt Slide, Brown County, Nebraska.	Merritt Dam Member.	3 trunk vertebrae (UNSM 100292, 100297 & 101102).	A gopher snake.	
Sistrurus	S. sp. indet.	Pratt Slide, Brown County, Nebraska.	Merritt Dam Member.	A trunk vertebra (UNSM 100251).	A rattlesnake.	
Texasophis	T. sp. indet.	Pratt Slide, Brown County, Nebraska.	Merritt Dam Member.	A trunk vertebra (UNSM 100265).	A colubrine snake.	
Thamnophis	T. sp. indet.	Pratt Slide, Brown County, Nebraska.	Merritt Dam Member.	12 trunk vertebrae.	A garter snake.	
Tregophis	T. brevirachis	Pratt Slide, Brown County, Nebraska.	Merritt Dam Member.	3 trunk vertebrae (UNSM 100254, 100256, 100257).	An erycine boa.	
Tropidoclonion	cf. T. sp. indet.	Pratt Slide, Brown County, Nebraska.	Merritt Dam Member.	A trunk vertebra (UNSM 100295).	A natricine snake.	
Viperidae	Gen. et. sp. indet.	Pratt Slide, Brown County, Nebraska.	Merritt Dam Member.	A trunk vertebra (UNSM 101121).	A viper, vertebra too damaged to be identified below the family level.	

==== Testudines ====
Testudines reported from the Ash Hollow Formation
Genus	Species	Location	Stratigraphic position	Material	Notes	Images
Kinosternon	K. wakeeniense	South-central Nebraska.			A mud turtle also found in the Ogallala Formation.	
Terrapene	T. sp.	Cherry County, Nebraska.		A hyoplastron.	May represent T. ornata longinsulae or another taxon.	

=== Amphibians ===
Amphibians reported from the Ash Hollow Formation
Genus	Species	Location	Stratigraphic position	Material	Notes	Images
Acris	cf. A. sp.	Pratt Slide, Brown County, Nebraska.	Merritt Dam Member.	One left ilium (UNSM 101143).	A cricket frog.	
Bufo	B. pliocompactilis	Pratt Slide, Brown County, Nebraska.	Merritt Dam Member.	Multiple ilia.	A true toad.	
Bufo	B. sp. indet.	Pratt Slide, Brown County, Nebraska.	Merritt Dam Member.	Multiple ilia.	A true toad.	
Hyla	H. sp. indet.	Pratt Slide, Brown County, Nebraska.	Merritt Dam Member.	A right ilium (UNSM 101127).	A tree frog.	
Rana	R. sp. indet.	Pratt Slide, Brown County, Nebraska.	Merritt Dam Member.	Multiple ilia.	A ranid frog.	
Spea	S. sp. indet.	Pratt Slide, Brown County, Nebraska.	Merritt Dam Member.	One left ilium (UNSM 101128).	A spadefoot toad.	
Tregobatrachus	T. sp. indet.	Pratt Slide, Brown County, Nebraska.	Merritt Dam Member.	A left ilium (UNSM 101126).	A frog of uncertain classification.	
Varibatrachus	V. abraczinskasae	Pratt Slide, Brown County, Nebraska.	Merritt Dam Member.	A right ilium (UNSM 101129).	A frog.	

=== Plants ===
Plants reported from the Ash Hollow Formation
Genus	Species	Location	Stratigraphic position	Material	Notes	Images
Berriochloa	B. communis				A stipeae grass also found in the Valentine Formation.	
Berriochloa	B. gabeli			Fossil anthoecia (husks).	A stipeae grass.	
Berriochloa	B. huletti			Fossil anthoecia (husks).	A stipeae grass.	
Berriochloa	B. intermedia	North-central Kansas.			A stipeae grass.	
Biorbia	B. fossilia			Nutlets.	A borage.	
Cryptantha	C. coroniformis			Nutlets.	A borage.	
Eleofimbris	E. svensonii				A cyperaceaen.	
Equisetum	E. sp.	West-central Nebraska.		Silicified leaf-sheath fragments.	A horsetail.	

== See also ==
- List of fossiliferous stratigraphic units in South Dakota
- Paleontology in South Dakota
- List of fossiliferous stratigraphic units in Nebraska
- Paleontology in Nebraska
