= Simpligaulus =

Simpligaulus Temporal range: Miocene, 17–14 Ma

Scientific classification
- Kingdom: Animalia
- Phylum: Chordata
- Class: Mammalia
- Infraclass: Placentalia
- Order: Rodentia
- Family: †Mylagaulidae
- Genus: †Simpligaulus; Wu, 2013

Type species
- Simpligaulus yangi Wu, 2013

Species
- S. yangi (Wu, 2013)

Extinct genus of mylagaulid rodent

Simpligaulus is a genus of mylagauline rodent from Early Miocene Asia.

== Description ==
Similar to other mylagaulines, it is inferred Simpligaulus was fossorial. Compared to other mylagaulids, Simpligaulus was rather small. It bore high-crowned teeth, and a prominent crest on the fourth premolar.

== Paleoecology ==
Simpligaulus is known from the Halamagai Formation, a fossil site associated with lacustrine and pluvial sediments. The formation is incredibly biodiverse, as Simpligaulus lived with various proboscideans, primates and crocodylians. It is inferred the genus lived in warm, humid environments.

== Classification ==
Previously classed amongst the Promylagaulinae, Simpligaulus is now considered to be a basal mylagauline. It is phylogenetically grouped with Mesogaulus, and is suspected to have evolved from North American mylagauline ancestors similar in morphology to Mesogaulus.
