= Catagonus carlesi =

Catagonus carlesi Temporal range: Late Pleistocene

Scientific classification
- Domain: Eukaryota
- Kingdom: Animalia
- Phylum: Chordata
- Class: Mammalia
- Order: Artiodactyla
- Family: Tayassuidae
- Genus: Catagonus
- Species: †C. carlesi

Binomial name
- †Catagonus carlesi (Rusconi, 1930)

Synonyms
- Parachoerus carlesi

Extinct species of peccary

Catagonus carlesi, or Parachoerus carlesi, is an extinct species of peccary that lived in Argentina during the Late Pleistocene.

== Description ==
Fossils of Catagonus carlesi have been dated to 26,630 ± 370 years BP. It was adapted to open or semi-open and arid or semi-arid environments with scarce or absent vegetation cover. These environmental conditions favored the settlement of mammals adapted to open environments.

== Taxonomy ==
A 2017 study on the phylogenetic systematics of Tayassuidae species suggests that Catagonus carlesi should be moved to the genus Parachoerus along with the living Chacoan peccary and C. bonaerensis, with Catagonus restricted to the extinct C. metropolitanus.
