= Pterogaulus =

Pterogaulus Temporal range: Miocene Barstovian–Hemphillian

Scientific classification
- Kingdom: Animalia
- Phylum: Chordata
- Class: Mammalia
- Order: Rodentia
- Family: †Mylagaulidae
- Genus: †Pterogaulus; Korth, 2000

Species
- P. laevis (Matthew, 1902); P. barbarellae (Korth, 2000)

Synonyms
- Mylagaulus laevis

Extinct genus of mylagauline rodent

Pterogaulus is a genus of mylagauline rodent from Miocene North America.

== Description ==
Similar to other members of Mylagaulidae, Pterogaulus was fossorial, living in underground burrows. These burrows could be as long as 7 meters in length, and were similar in construction to modern gophers. Despite being grouped closely with the horned Ceratogaulus, Pterogaulus lacks any indication of nasal horns. The post-orbital processes are large, and the premolars bear a small depression. The fourth premolar in particular has a branched pattern, with an antero-posteriorly elongated enamel lake.

== Classification ==
Pterogaulus is grouped with the derived subfamily Mylagaulinae within Mylagaulidae, closest to the genus Umbogaulus.
