= Catagonus metropolitanus =

Catagonus metropolitanus Temporal range: Pleistocene

Scientific classification
- Kingdom: Animalia
- Phylum: Chordata
- Class: Mammalia
- Order: Artiodactyla
- Family: Tayassuidae
- Genus: Catagonus
- Species: †C. metropolitanus

Binomial name
- †Catagonus metropolitanus Ameghino, 1904

Extinct species of peccary

Catagonus metropolitanus is an extinct species of peccary known from the Pleistocene of Argentina.

== Taxonomy ==
Catagonus metropolitanus is notable as the type species of a genus that contains a living species; the Chacoan peccary. The living Chacoan peccary was first described in 1930 from subfossil remains, and was only found alive by scientists in 1972, making it an example of a Lazarus taxon.

A 2017 study on the phylogenetic systematics of Tayassuidae species suggests that Catagonus should only contain C. metropolitanus. The extinct narrow-headed peccary (C. stenocephalus) should be moved to Brasiliochoerus, while the Chacoan peccary, C. bonaerensis and C. carlesi should be placed in Parachoerus. If this is accepted, then Catagonus would become an extinct genus once more.
