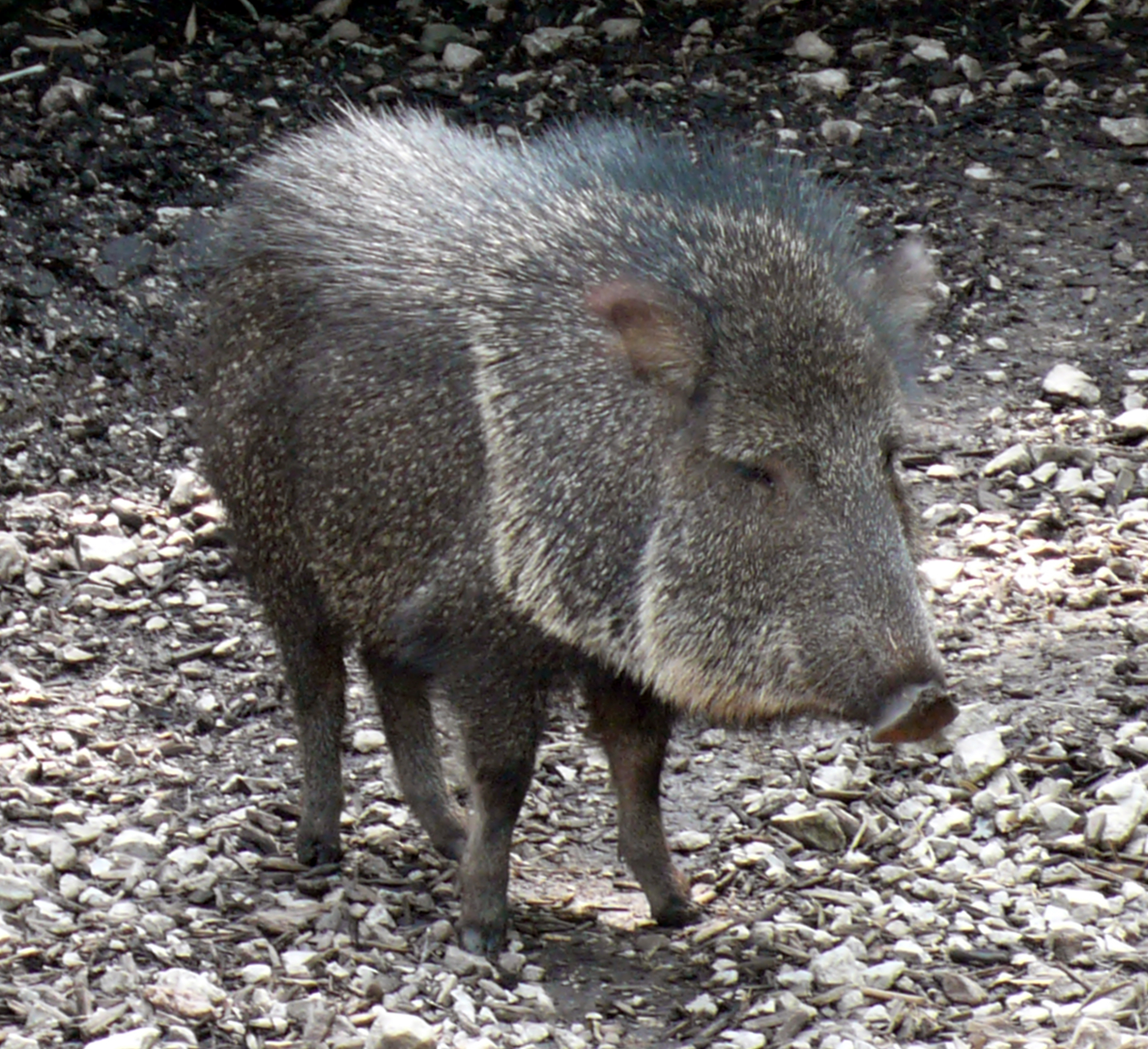
- Chacoan peccary (Catagonus wagneri)

Scientific classification
- Kingdom: Animalia
- Phylum: Chordata
- Class: Mammalia
- Infraclass: Placentalia
- Order: Artiodactyla
- Family: Tayassuidae
- Genus: Catagonus; Ameghino, 1904

Species
- Catagonus wagneri? - Chacoan peccary; †Catagonus bonaerensis?; †Catagonus carlesi?; †Catagonus metropolitanus (type); †Catagonus stenocephalus? - Narrow-headed peccary

Synonyms
- Brasiliochoerus; Parachoerus

= Catagonus =

Catagonus Temporal range: Pliocene – Recent

Genus of mammals

Catagonus is a genus of peccaries that contains the living Chacoan peccary, C. wagneri, and several extinct species. The genus has always been restricted to South America.

== Taxonomy ==
Catagonus is notable in that the type species, C. metropolitanus, is extinct; the living Chacoan peccary was first described in 1930 from subfossil remains, and only found alive by scientists in 1972 (an example of a Lazarus taxon).

A 2017 study on the phylogenetic systematics of Tayassuidae species suggests that Catagonus should only contain C. metropolitanus. The extinct narrow-headed peccary (C. stenocephalus) should be moved into Brasiliochoerus, while the Chacoan peccary, C. bonaerensis, and C. carlesi should be placed in Parachoerus. If this is accepted, then Catagonus becomes an extinct genus once more.
