= Proantilocapra =

Proantilocapra Temporal range: Miocene

Scientific classification
- Domain: Eukaryota
- Kingdom: Animalia
- Phylum: Chordata
- Class: Mammalia
- Order: Artiodactyla
- Family: Antilocapridae
- Genus: †Proantilocapra; Barbour & Schultz, 1934
- Species: †P. platycornea

Binomial name
- †Proantilocapra platycornea Barbour & Schultz, 1934

Extinct genus of mammals

Proantilocapra is an extinct genus of the artiodactyl family Antilocapridae. The remains of this animal appeared in the Ash Hollow Formation in Nebraska, United States, and they last appeared 13.6 million years ago, during the Miocene epoch.
