= Centuriavis =

Centuriavis Temporal range: Miocene (Clarendonian) 11.4 Ma

Scientific classification
- Kingdom: Animalia
- Phylum: Chordata
- Class: Aves
- Order: Galliformes
- Family: Phasianidae
- Genus: †Centuriavis; Ksepka et al., 2022

Species
- Centuriavis lioae Ksepka et al., 2022

Extinct genus of bird

Centuriavis is an extinct genus of phasianid landfowl from the Miocene of Nebraska. Known from a well preserved and articulated skeleton preserving the skull as well as much of the vertebral column, its name stems from the fact that it remained undescribed for nearly a hundred years. It is estimated that it weighed 1.7 kg (3.7 lb), which would make it comparable in size with the average female greater sage grouse. Centuriavis may be related to grouse and turkeys and only a single species has been described, Centuriavis lioae.

== History and naming ==
The type material of Centuriavis consists of an articulated fossil preserving primarily the front of the body including the skull, pectoral girdle, wings and the vertebrae up to and including parts of the synsacrum. These remains were collected by the 1932 Skinner Expedition at the Machaerodus quarry, a locality within the Merritt Dam Member of the Ash Hollow Formation. The Machaerodus quarry is generally thought to be Clarendonian in age, with the overlying ash layer indicating a minimum age of 11.4 million years. The same locality also yielded an additional humerus about 88% the size of the holotype and a tarsometatarsus, both of which have been tentatively referred to Centuriavis by Ksepka and colleagues. They note that the size difference could potentially be explained by sexual dimorphism, with the type specimen belonging to a male while the referred humerus may have been that of a female. However, they also note that the material could also have belonged to a different, second type of galliform. Despite the relative completeness and preservation of the type specimen, the fossils of Centuriavis remained undescribed for nearly a century until being examined by Ksepka and colleagues.

The massive time gap between the discovery and description of the bird is also the basis for the genus' scientific name, consisting of "centuria" (one hundred) and "avis" (bird). The species name derives from Suzanne Lio, managing director at the Bruce Museum of Arts and Science where the fossil was previously held.

== Description ==
The beak of Centuriavis is proportionally shorter than in modern turkeys with a tip that's slightly downturned. The nares are small, resembling those of ptarmigan and prairie chickens. The skull roof is smooth, which differs from grouse and some individuals of the turkey which possess rugosities above the eyes. The lower jaw is more strongly curved than in turkeys with a short mandibular symphysis that lacks a fenestra. The preservation of the skull allowed for a detailed look at the neuroanatomy of Centuriavis, revealing that it possessed small olfactory bulbs, a trait typical for land fowl. The hyperpallium, also known as wulst, most closely resembles turkeys in its degree of projection. The well developed optic lobes likewise resemble turkeys and are located almost entirely behind the widest point of the endocast.

As prior research has shown that the strongest indicator for body mass in landfowls was the length of the coracoid, Ksepka and colleagues were able to estimate the weight of Centuriavis. They concluded that the animal may have reached a bodymass of 1.718 kg (3.79 lb), which is close to the average weight reported in female greater sage-grouse. This would render Centuriavis larger than most extant grouse species, but still smaller than the largest modern grouse species (such as the western capercaillie) and modern turkeys.

== Phylogeny ==
Two primary analysis were conducted to determine the position of Centuriavis within galliforms, both using the molecular backbone constraint established by Hosner and colleagues in 2017. Of these two phylogenetic analysis, the first recovered Centuriavis in a large polytomy within crown phasianids alongside turkeys, grouse, true partridges and various pheasants. The reason for this poorly resolved result is the inclusion of Panraogallus, a genus that is equally plausible to be a stem-turkey, stem-grouse or some other type of phasianid. Removing this taxon from the analysis yielded a better resolved phylogenetic tree, excluding many pheasants from the polytomy present in the prior analysis, only leaving Centuriavis, the modern Koklass pheasant, turkeys and grouse. However there is little support for this clade given the material lacking in Centuriavis and the major skeletal differences between grouse and turkeys, with only a single synapomorphy recovered.

- - Arborophilinae (wood and jungle partridges)
  - - - Blood pheasant
      - - Pavovinae (peafowl and peacock pheasant)
        - - Coturnicinae (quails and allies)
          - - Long-billed partridge
            - - Red junglefowl
              - Chinese bamboo partridge
            - Black francolin
    - - - Satyr tragopan
        - Himalayan monal
      - - - Grey partridge
          - - Reeves's pheasant
            - - Lady Amherst's pheasant
              - - Common pheasant
                - - Cheer pheasant
                  - - White eared pheasant
                    - Bulwer's pheasant
        - - Koklass pheasant
          - Centuriavis lioae
          - - Tetraoninae (grouse)
            - Meleagridinae (turkeys)

== Evolution of grouse and turkeys ==
While the relationship between Centuriavis and the genus Pucrasia could not be resolved, Ksepka and colleagues favor the hypothesis that Centuriavis was the sister taxon to the clade uniting grouse and turkeys, which would match the idea that the common ancestor of these two families dispersed from Asia into North America and only then diverged from one another. However, other factors make it unlikely that it was the direct ancestor of this clade. Prior attempts to determine the divergence date between grouse and turkeys indicate that the two lineages split from one another during the early Miocene, before Centuriavis appeared as part of the Machaerodus quarry fauna. To complicate matters further, said analysis were solely based on extant species, neglecting the fossil record of grouse from the Pliocene and Pleistocene of Eurasia. These remains, although fragmentary, have commonly been assigned to the various grouse genera still alive today and give some credibility to the idea that the grouse-turkey clade did not originate in America but in Eurasia. Whichever the case, this suggests that Centuriavis was not the direct ancestor to turkeys and grouse, but rather an early diverging relative that would go on to coexist with its more derived relatives.
