= Anchigyps =

Anchigyps Temporal range: Late Miocene

Scientific classification
- Kingdom: Animalia
- Phylum: Chordata
- Class: Aves
- Order: Accipitriformes
- Family: Accipitridae
- Genus: †Anchigyps
- Species: †A. voorhiesi

Binomial name
- †Anchigyps voorhiesi Zhang et al., 2012

Extinct genus of birds

Anchigyps is an extinct genus of accipitrid that lived during the Late Miocene.

== Distribution ==
Anchigyps voorhiesi is known from the Ash Hollow Formation of Nebraska.
