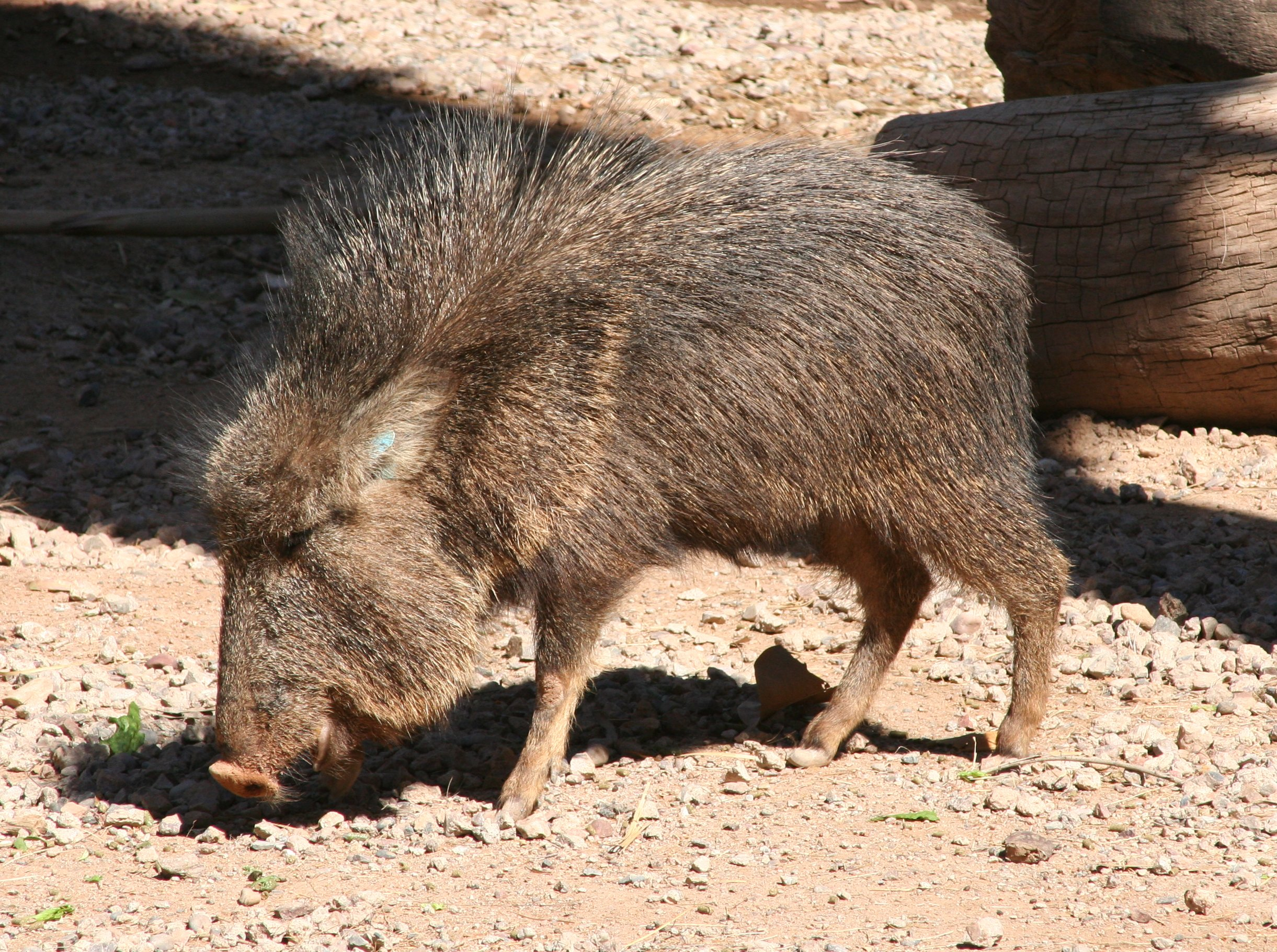
- Male at the Phoenix Zoo
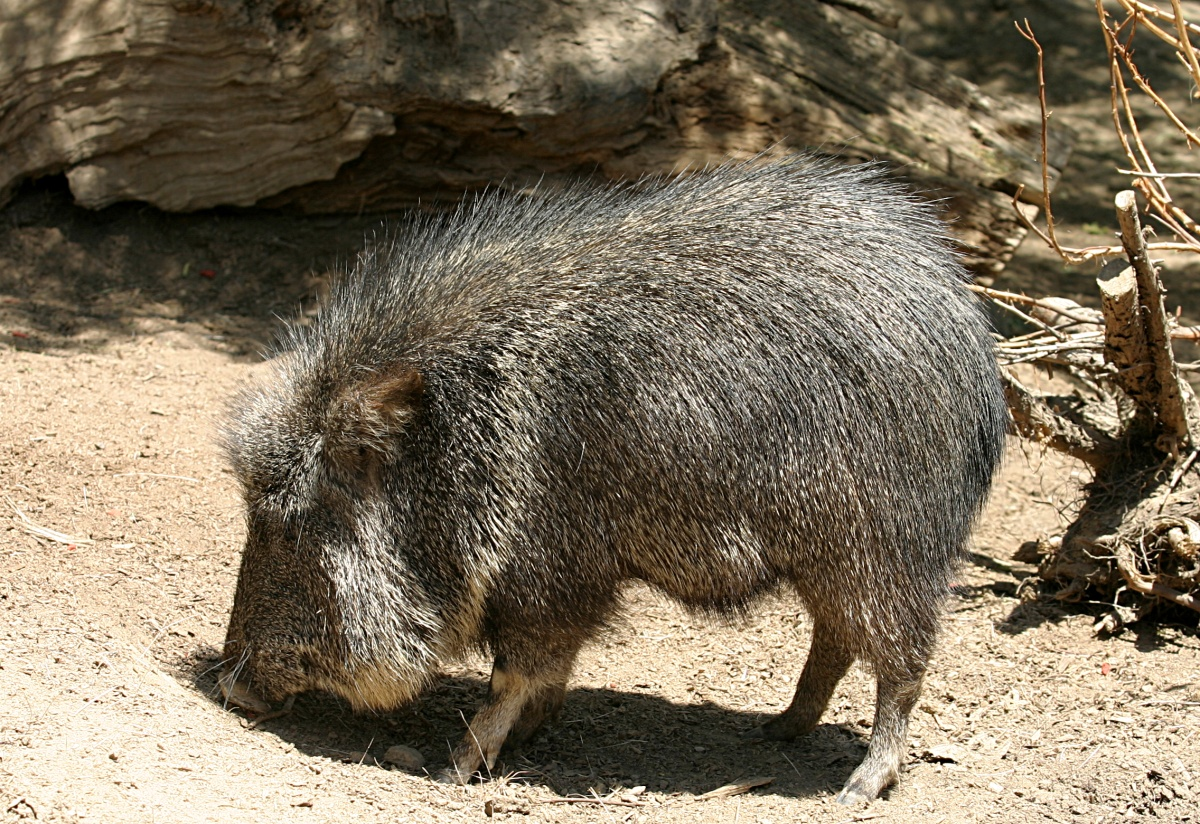
- Female at the San Diego Zoo

Conservation status
- Endangered (IUCN 3.1)
- CITES Appendix I

Scientific classification
- Kingdom: Animalia
- Phylum: Chordata
- Class: Mammalia
- Order: Artiodactyla
- Family: Tayassuidae
- Genus: Catagonus
- Species: C. wagneri

Binomial name
- Catagonus wagneri (Carlos Rusconi, 1930)
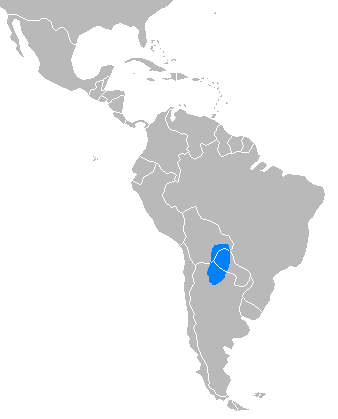

Synonyms
- Parachoerus wagneri Rusconi, 1930

= Chacoan peccary =

Species of mammal in the peccary family

The Chacoan peccary (Catagonus wagneri), also called the taguá, is a peccary found in the Gran Chaco of Paraguay, Bolivia, and Argentina. It is the only extant species of genus Catagonus. With a total estimated population of approximately 3,000, it is considered to be an endangered species.

== History ==
The Chacoan peccary was first described in 1930 based on fossils and was originally thought to be an extinct species. In 1971, the animal was discovered to still be extant in the Argentine province of Salta. The species was well-known to the local people, but it took a while for Western scientists to acknowledge its existence. Because it was originally described as extinct before its rediscovery, it is an example of a Lazarus taxon.

== Taxonomy ==
The Chacoan peccary is notable in that it is not the type species of its genus, Catagonus, despite being the only living representative. Instead, the type is the extinct Catagonus metropolitanus. Such a case is an example of a Lazarus taxon, and shares this trait with another South American native, the bush dog. The description of the Chacoan peccary was first published in 1975.

A 2017 study on the phylogenetic systematics of Tayassuidae species suggests that Catagonus should only contain C. metropolitanus. The extinct narrow-headed peccary (C. stenocephalus) should be moved into Brasiliochoerus, while the Chacoan peccary, Catagonus bonaerensis and Catagonus carlesi should be placed in Parachoerus. If this is accepted, then Catagonus becomes an extinct genus once more.

== Habitat ==
The Chacoan peccary is confined to hot, dry areas. Dominated by low-lying succulents and thorny bushes, the Gran Chaco is about 140,000 km^{2} (54,000 sq mi). A few scattered giant trees are found, but the majority of the vegetation is thorny scrub vegetation. The Chacoan peccary has developed adaptations such as well-developed sinuses to combat dry, dusty conditions. Their feet are also small, which allows maneuverability among spiny plants.

== Physical characteristics ==
The largest of the three generally accepted species of peccaries, the Chacoan peccary has many pig-like features. It is an ungulate with a well-formed rostrum with a tough leathery snout. The bristle-like hair is generally brown to almost gray. A dark stripe runs across the back, and white fur is on the shoulders. Chacoan peccaries differ from other peccary species by having longer ears, snouts, and tails. It has white hairs around the mouth, unlike other peccaries. Catagonus wagneri also has a third hind toe, but other peccaries only have two. The hypsodont teeth follow this dental formula: 2/3, 1/1, 3/3, 3/3. The upper canines display the distinguishing trait of peccaries, pointing downwards instead of out and up like pigs, which may be a signal for other peccaries to keep the group together through the dense bush.

== Reproduction ==
Young are generally born between September and December, but litters have been found almost year-round. Births have been linked to periods of food abundance and rainfall. The average number of embryos has been recorded as approximately 2.72. Females may leave the herd to give birth and then return afterwards. Newborns are precocial, able to run a few hours after birth. The pelage of the young resembles that of the adults. There is no sexual dimorphism.

== Behavior ==
Chacoan peccaries often travel in herds of up to 20 individuals. They are active during the day, especially in the morning when they are most apt to travel. Herds display a general travel cycle within their home range of 42 days. This allows the individuals to monitor and show ownership over their areas.

These social mammals communicate by various sounds, ranging from grunts to chatters of the teeth. Though individuals may occasionally exhibit aggressive behavior such as charging and biting, this species is not as aggressive as others.

As a defensive strategy, members of a herd may line up in a defensive wall; this makes the herds harder targets for hunters. The Chacoan peccary produces a milky, odorous substance used for marking trees, shrubs, and similar. The substance is secreted from glands located on their backs, and is dispersed by rubbing. Frequently bathing in mud or dust, Chacoan peccaries also defecate at particular "stations".

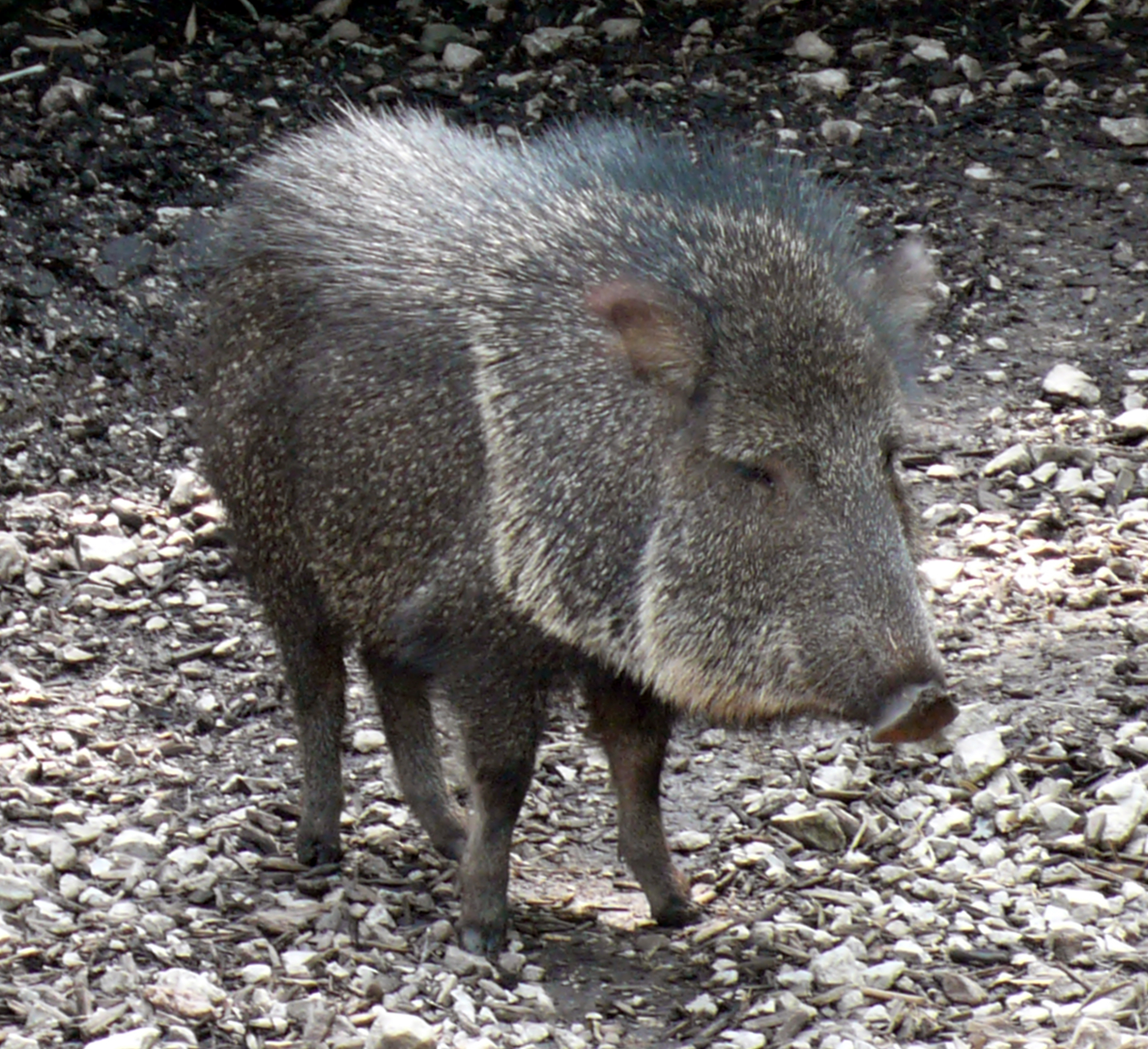
At Saint Louis Zoo

== Food habits ==
The arid habitat of the Gran Chaco region provides very tough vegetation for the Chacoan peccary. These peccaries feed on various species of cacti, such as Cleistocactus baumannii and Opuntia discolor. It uses its tough snout to roll the cacti on the ground, rubbing the spines off. It may pull off the spines with its teeth and spit them out. The kidneys are specialized to break down acids from the cacti. The two-chambered stomachs are also well suited to digest tough foods. Occasionally grazing on bromeliad roots, it also eats acacia pods and fallen cactus flowers. This species of peccary seeks out salt licks formed from ant mounds and construction projects (road building and land clearings). The Chacoan peccary gains essential minerals like calcium, magnesium, and chlorine from the salt licks.

== Conservation status ==
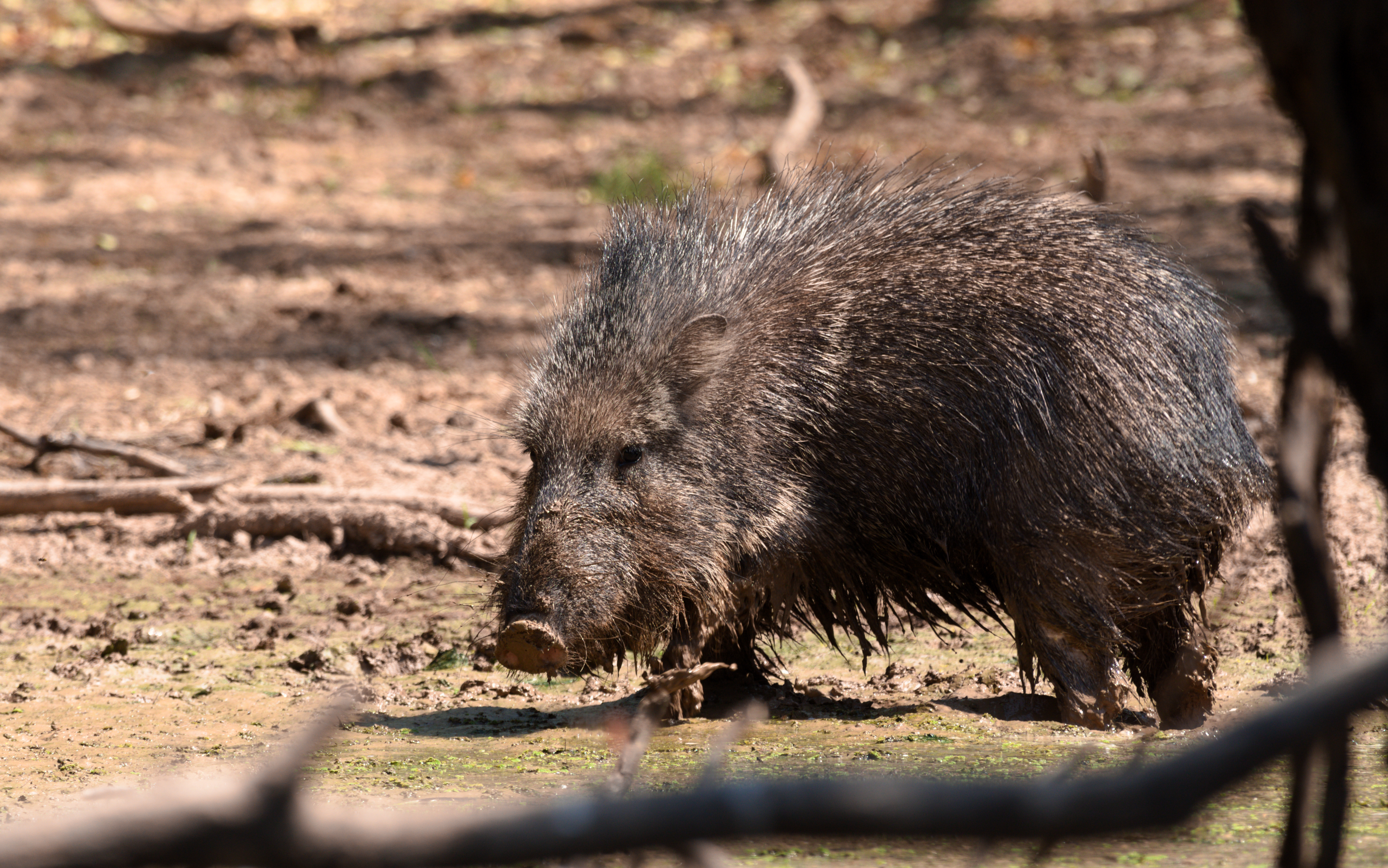
In Teniente Enciso National Park, Boquerón, Paraguay

Because the Chacoan peccary is endemic to a formerly isolated region of South America, it is most vulnerable to human activity. Just as quickly as this species is discovered in an area, it disappears. Herd numbers are decreasing as a result of habitat loss and fragmentation. Their range is being quickly transformed into large Texas-style ranches. Hunting also persists, as does an unidentified disease that has plagued the herds in recent years. A population has been established in North American and European zoos. Preserves have also been established in Paraguay, but are not highly enforced.
