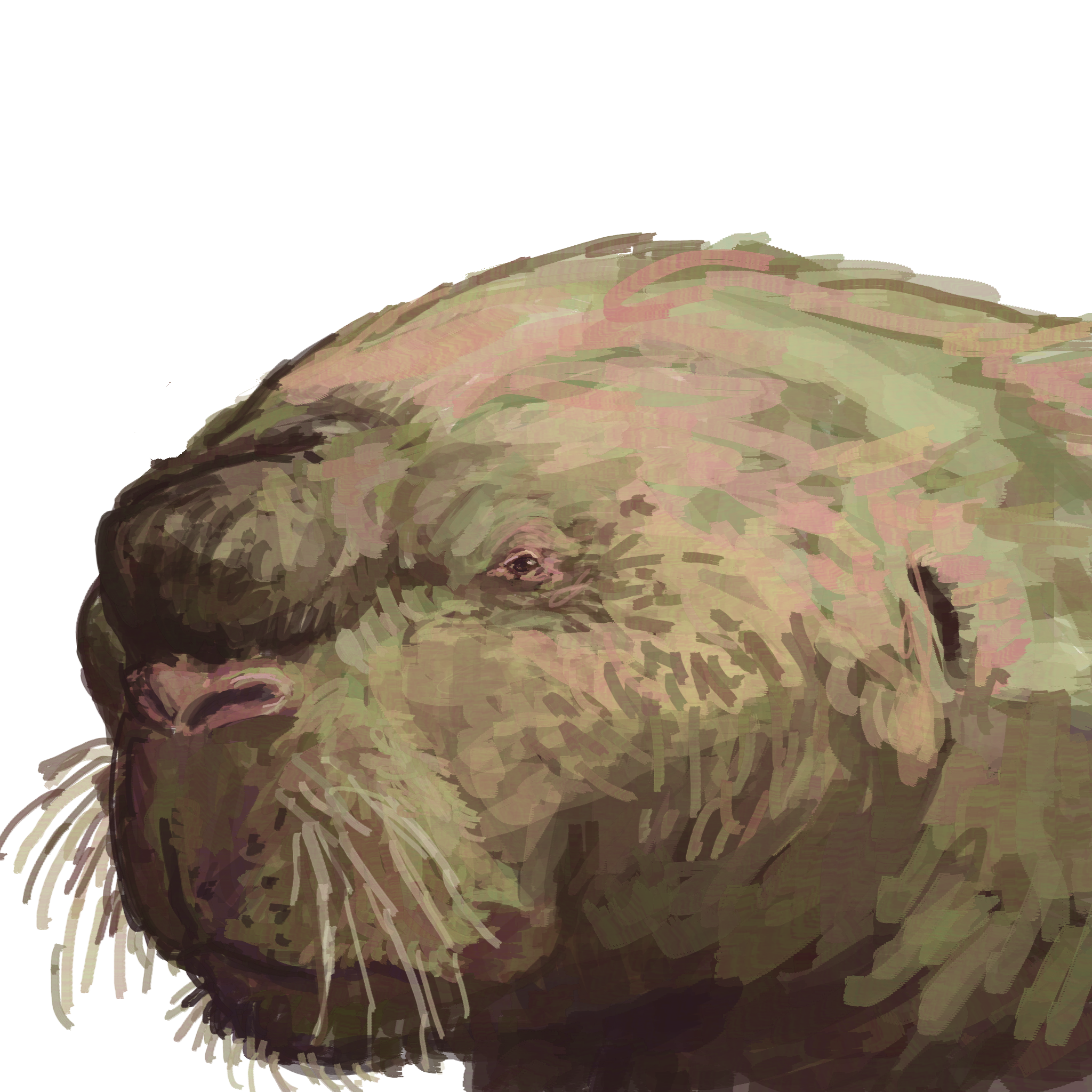
- Reconstruction of U. galushai.

Scientific classification
- Kingdom: Animalia
- Phylum: Chordata
- Class: Mammalia
- Infraclass: Placentalia
- Order: Rodentia
- Family: †Mylagaulidae
- Genus: †Umbogaulus; Korth, 2000

Species
- U. monodon (Cope, 1881); U. galushai (Korth, 2000)

= Umbogaulus =

Umbogaulus Temporal range: Miocene 15.97–13.6 Ma

Extinct genus of mylagaulid rodent

Umbogaulus is a genus of mylagaulid rodent from Miocene North America.

== Description ==
=== Crania ===
Umbogaulus, much like other mylagaulids, have thickened nasals, though they lack the horns of Ceratogaulus. Umbogaulus has large bosses on the anterior end of the nasals, similar to the related Hesperogaulus. The premaxilla of Umbogaulus are splayed laterally, to accommodate the nasal bosses. The skull is generally heavier built than other mylagaulids, and the shape of the mandibular ramus is deep and compressed. In terms of dentition, the teeth of Umbogaulus are highly adapted. The fourth premolar is considerably wider than those of related mylagaulids, and all premolars are patterned with complex holes and divots. The teeth are so diagnostic that they have been used to assign one species, U. monodon, to the genus. The molars of U. monodon are greatly enlarged, and there is no cementum lining the external enamel ring. The post-canine diastema is short.

== Paleoenvironment ==
Umbogaulus has been found in the mid-Miocene Fort Randall Formation. Being a fluvial depositional site composed of claystone, the Fort Randall Formation was a meandering river environment during the middle Miocene. The location was highly biodiverse, with 29 named species and 300 specimens known from the area. Some species that lived alongside Umbogaulus include the canine Tomarctus, the horses Merychippus and Archaeohippus, the garter snake Thamnophis and a fragmentary proboscidean. Umbogaulus has also been found in the Olcott Formation, another fluvial deposition site.

== Classification ==
Umbogaulus is currently grouped within Mylagaulinae, the more derived subfamily of mylagaulids. U. monodon was originally classified as a species of the related Mylagaulus, though dental similarity has caused it to be moved to Umbogaulus.
