= Catagonus stenocephalus =

Catagonus stenocephalus Temporal range: Mid - Late Pleistocene

Scientific classification
- Kingdom: Animalia
- Phylum: Chordata
- Class: Mammalia
- Infraclass: Placentalia
- Order: Artiodactyla
- Family: Tayassuidae
- Genus: Catagonus
- Species: †C. stenocephalus

Binomial name
- †Catagonus stenocephalus (Lund in Reinhardt, 1880)

Synonyms
- Brasiliochoerus stenocephalus Rusconi, 1930; Dicotyles stenocephalus Lund, 1838

Extinct species of peccary

Catagonus stenocephalus is an extinct species of peccary that lived in South America during the Late Pleistocene. Fossils have been found in Brazil, Argentina, and Bolivia. It is commonly known as the narrow-headed peccary due to its long and markedly convex rostrum.

== Taxonomy ==
The narrow-headed peccary was originally described as Dicotyles stenocephalus by Lund in 1838 from fossil remains found in Brazilian caves. It was subsequently included under Catagonus when formally published in 1880. In 1930, it was included in the genus Platygonus by Rusconi, which created the subgenus Brasiliochoerus to designate it. In 1981, Paula Couto elevated Brasiliochoerus to genus level.

However, in later years some authors pointed out the similarity between Brasiliochoerus and Catagonus, and subsequently the narrow-headed peccary has been included in the genus Catagonus.

In 2017, a study on the classification of the Tayassuidae suggested that the narrow-headed peccary was distinct from other species of Catagonus, and Brasiliochoerus should be elevated back to genus level. This study is controversial, as it also suggests that the living Chacoan peccary be moved to the genus Parachoerus, with Catagonus restricted to the extinct C. metropolitanus.
