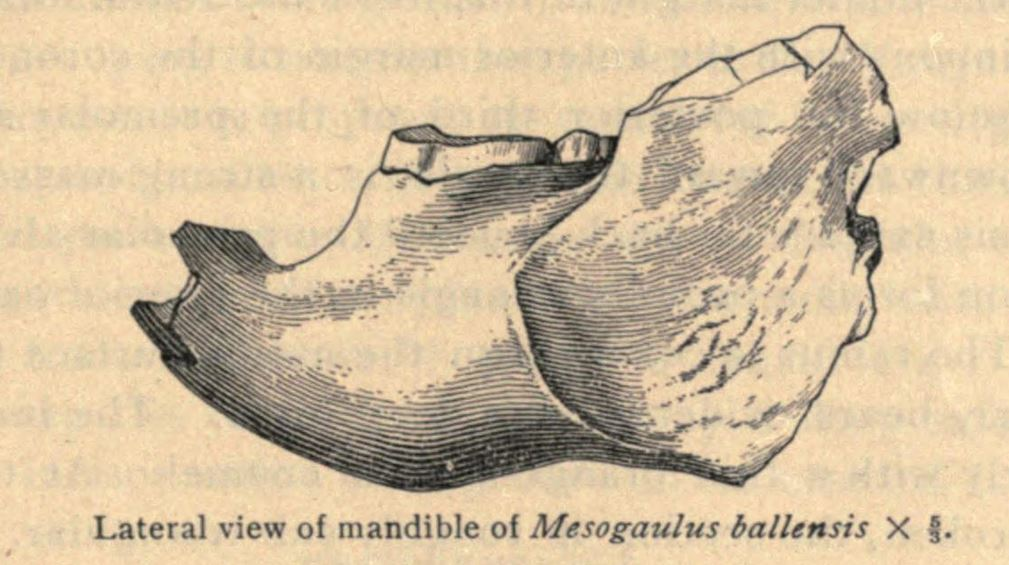
- Mandible of M. ballensis

Scientific classification
- Kingdom: Animalia
- Phylum: Chordata
- Class: Mammalia
- Order: Rodentia
- Family: †Mylagaulidae
- Genus: †Mesogaulus; Riggs, 1899

Species
- M.ballensis (Matthew, 1902); M. paniensis (Riggs, 1899)

Synonyms
- Mylagaulus paniensis

= Mesogaulus =

Mesogaulus Temporal range: Early Miocene

Extinct genus of mylagaulid rodent

Mesogaulus is a genus of mylagaulid rodent from Miocene North America.

== Description ==
Mesogaulus is very basal morphologically, lacking horns of later mylagaulids like Ceratogaulus. The genus also has large fourth premolars and hypsodont teeth, though not to the extremes of later mylagaulids. The first molar is elongated, whilst the third is more rotund. Similar to other members of their clade, Mesogaulus has a low, broad skull.

== Classification ==
Mesogaulus is currently grouped within Mesogaulinae, a potentially paraphyletic subfamily within Mylagaulidae containing the more basal members of the group. It has been suggested historically that Mesogaulus was ancestral to the later mylagaulines, though this is not supported by modern phylogenies.
