= Mckennahyus =

Mckennahyus Temporal range: Tortonian

Scientific classification
- Kingdom: Animalia
- Phylum: Chordata
- Class: Mammalia
- Order: Artiodactyla
- Family: Tayassuidae
- Genus: †Mckennahyus
- Species: †M. parisidutrai

Binomial name
- †Mckennahyus parisidutrai Prothero, 2021

Mckennahyus is an extinct genus of tayassuid that lived during the Tortonian stage of the Miocene epoch.

== Distribution ==
Mckennahyus parisidutrai is known from the Ash Hollow Formation of Nebraska.
