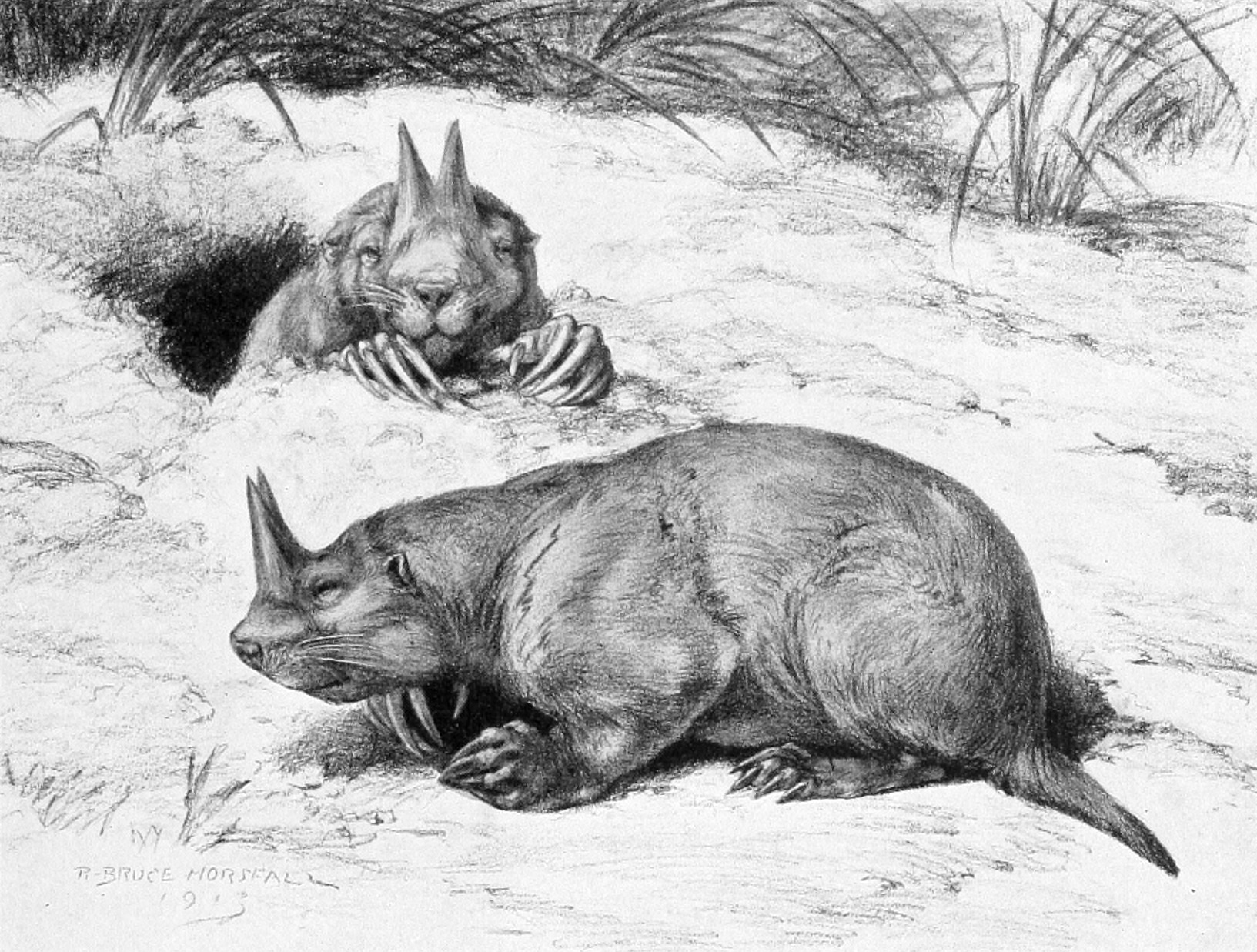
- Reconstruction of Ceratogaulus hatcheri

Scientific classification
- Kingdom: Animalia
- Phylum: Chordata
- Class: Mammalia
- Order: Rodentia
- Suborder: Sciuromorpha
- Family: †Mylagaulidae; Cope, 1881

Subfamilies
- See text

= Mylagaulidae =

Mylagaulids Temporal range: 28–5 Ma Late Oligocene - Early Pliocene

Extinct family of rodents

The Mylagaulidae or mylagaulids are an extinct family of sciuromorph rodents nested within the superfamily Aplodontioidea. They are known from the Neogene of North America and China. The oldest member is the Late Oligocene Trilaccogaulus montanensis that lived some 29 million years ago (Mya), and the youngest was Ceratogaulus hatcheri—formerly in the invalid genus "Epigaulus" —which was found barely into the Pliocene, some 5 Mya.

Most mylagaulids were small, fossorial rodents which sheltered and potentially foraged underground, using their heads to push soil and dig burrows. Some of the larger species may have spent more time above ground, as their nerve structure suggests a greater reliance on sight over touch. Mylagaulids are sometimes known as "horned gophers", though they are not true gophers, and only one genus (Ceratogaulus) is confirmed to have had horns.

== Taxonomy ==
Three subfamilies are recognized. The taxonomy of Galbreathia is not resolved; it might belong in Mylagaulinae, but lacks the characteristic apomorphies (derived traits) of that subfamily.

Promylagaulinae

- Genus Crucimys
- Genus Promylagaulus
- Genus Trilaccogaulus

Mesogaulinae

- Genus Mesogaulus - includes Mylagaulodon

Mylagaulinae

- Genus Alphagaulus (paraphyletic)
- Genus Ceratogaulus - includes "Epigaulus"
- Genus Hesperogaulus
- Genus Mylagaulus
- Genus Notogaulus
- Genus Pterogaulus
- Genus Umbogaulus
- Genus Simpligaulus

incertae sedis

- Genus Galbreathia - basal in Mylagaulinae?
