= Mylagaulus =

Mylagaulus Temporal range: 13.6–5.33 Ma

Scientific classification
- Kingdom: Animalia
- Phylum: Chordata
- Class: Mammalia
- Order: Rodentia
- Family: †Mylagaulidae
- Genus: †Mylagaulus; Cope, 1878

Type species
- †Mylagaulus sesquipedalis Cope, 1878

Species
- M. cambridgensis; M. cornusaulax? Czaplewski, 2012; M. elassos; M. kinseyi; M. sesquipedalis

Extinct genus of rodents

Mylagaulus is an extinct genus of rodents in the family Mylagaulidae. Mylagaulus lived in the Americas during the middle to late Miocene.

== Description ==
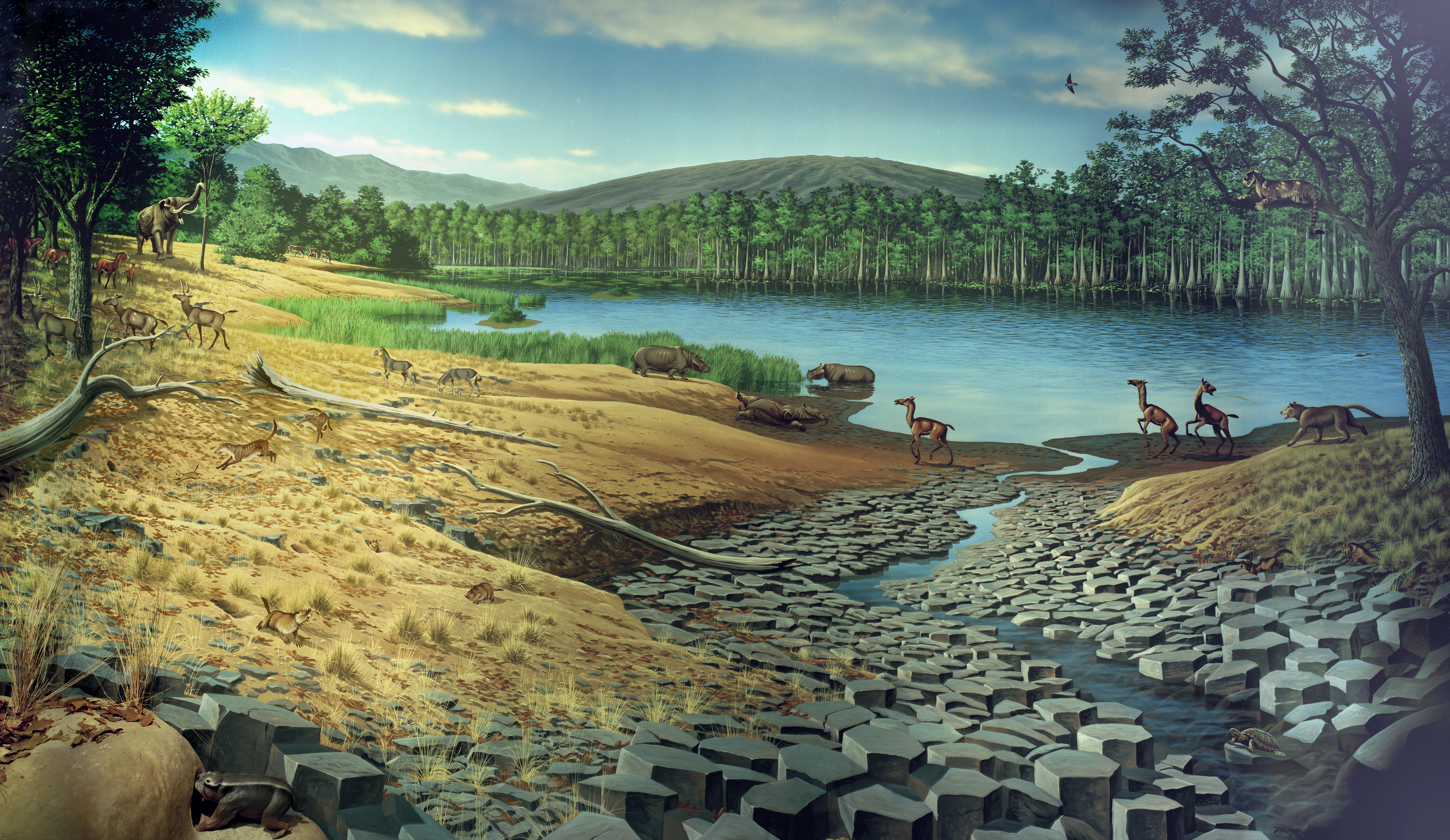
Restoration of Mylagaulus (lower left) and other animals of the Mascall assemblage

The osteology of Mylagaulus suggests it was fossorial, including a robust ulna and a deep ungual phalanx. The skull is wider than it is long, with broad zygomastes, and the cheek teeth are hypsodont. The dental formula of Mylagaulus is 1,0,1,3-01,0,1,3-0.

== Classification ==
Mylagaulus is placed within Mylagaulidae, close to Ceratogaulus. Historically, some species of Mylagaulus have been placed within Ceratogaulus and vice versa. For example, C. minor has been intermittently placed as M. minor by some authors.

One purported Mylagaulus species, M. cornusaulax, has horns on its nasal bones, similar to Ceratogaulus. Its tooth structure was initially considered distinct from Ceratogaulus species, but an analysis by Calede and Samuels (2020) indicated that some Ceratogaulus species have similar teeth. They consider M. cornusaulax to clade among Ceratogaulus species, not with Mylagaulus. No other species of Mylagaulus preserve the nasal bones, so it is unknown whether others had horns.
