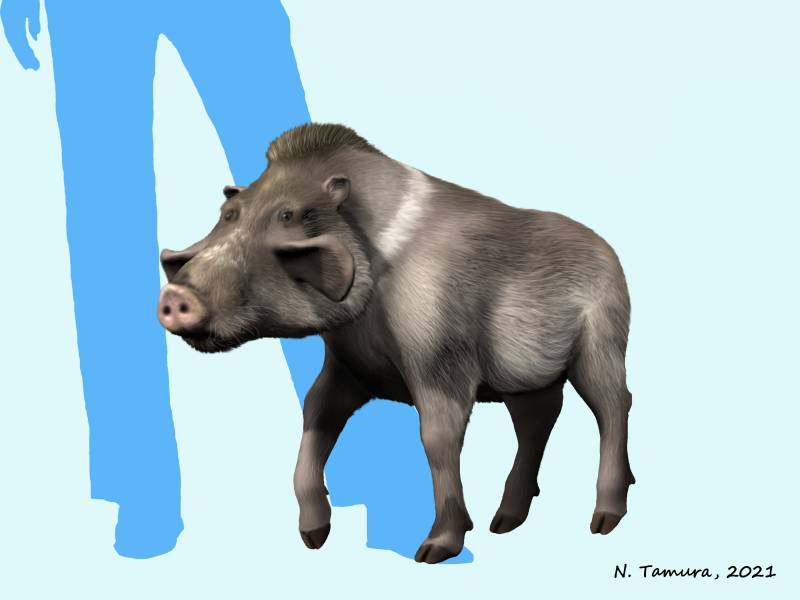

Scientific classification
- Kingdom: Animalia
- Phylum: Chordata
- Class: Mammalia
- Order: Artiodactyla
- Family: Tayassuidae
- Genus: †Skinnerhyus; Prothero & Pollen, 2013
- Species: †S. shermerorum

Binomial name
- †Skinnerhyus shermerorum Prothero & Pollen, 2013

= Skinnerhyus =

Skinnerhyus Temporal range: 13.6–10.3 Ma Middle Miocene

Extinct peccary

Skinnerhyus shermerorum is an extinct peccary species from the late Miocene of Nebraska, United States. It had comparatively enormous, wing-like cheekbones.
