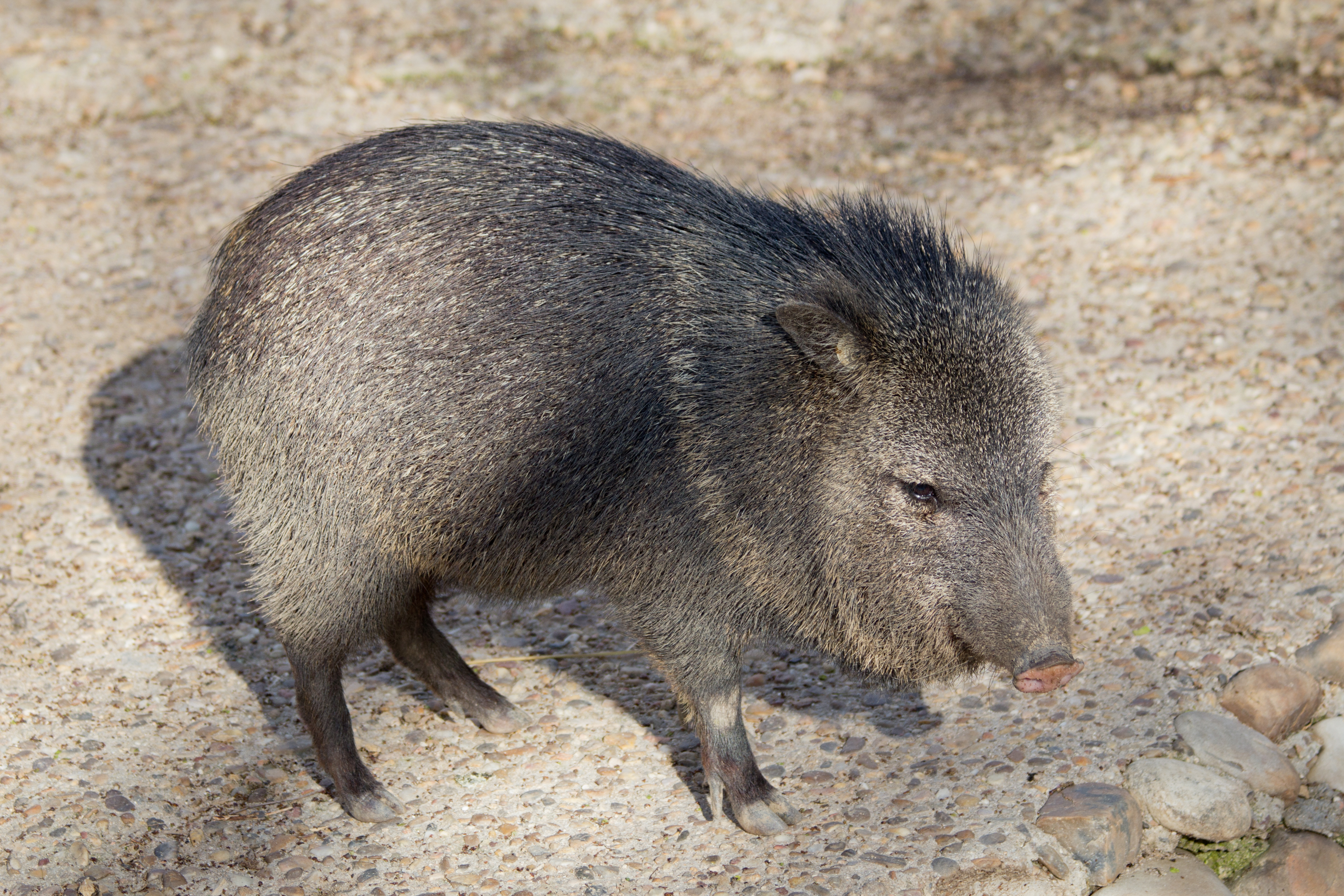
- Collared peccary, Dicotyles tajacu

Scientific classification
- Kingdom: Animalia
- Phylum: Chordata
- Class: Mammalia
- Order: Artiodactyla
- Suborder: Suina
- Family: Tayassuidae; Palmer, 1897

Type genus
- Tayassu Fischer von Waldheim, 1814

Extant and subfossil genera
- Tayassu; Catagonus; Dicotyles; †Mylohyus; †Platygonus
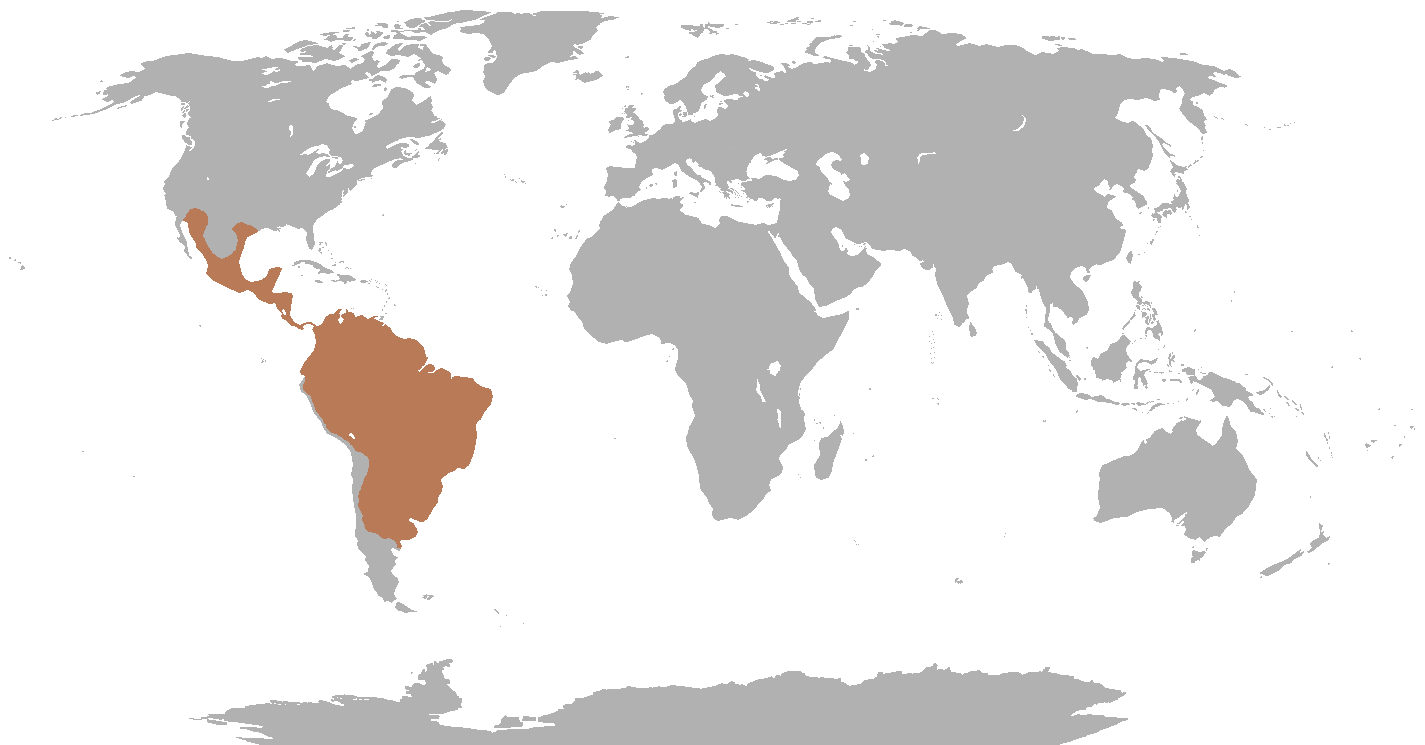
- Range of the peccaries

Synonyms
- Dicotylidae

= Peccary =

Peccaries Temporal range: Early Miocene–Present

Family of pig-like mammals

Peccaries (also javelinas or skunk pigs) are pig-like ungulates of the family Tayassuidae (New World pigs). They are found throughout Central and South America, Trinidad in the Caribbean, and in the southwestern area of North America. Peccaries usually measure between 90 and 130 cm (2 ft 11 in and 4 ft 3 in) in length, and a full-grown adult usually weighs about 20 to 40 kg (44 to 88 lb). They represent the closest relatives of the family Suidae, which contains pigs and relatives. Together Tayassuidae and Suidae are grouped in the suborder Suina within the order Artiodactyla (even-toed ungulates).

Peccaries are social creatures that live in herds. They are omnivores and eat roots, grubs, and a variety of other foods. They can identify each other by their strong odors. A group of peccaries that travel and live together is called a squadron. A squadron of peccaries averages between six and nine members. They give birth year-round to an average litter of two.

Peccaries first appeared in North America during the Miocene and migrated into South America during the Pliocene–Pleistocene as part of the Great American Interchange.

When the two native species occur in the wild in similar ranges, they are often confused with feral domestic pigs, commonly known as "razorback" hogs in many parts of the United States.

The Maya kept herds of peccaries, using them in rituals and for food. They are kept as pets in many countries in addition to being raised on farms as a source of food.

== Etymology ==
The word peccary is derived from the Carib word pakira or paquira.

In Portuguese, a peccary is called pecari, porco-do-mato, queixada, tajaçu, among other names like Cateto or Caititu. In Spanish, it is called javelina, jabalí (a word also used to describe wild boar), sajino, or pecarí. The word javelina derives from the Spanish word for "wild boar". In French Guiana and Suriname, the animal is called pakira.

The scientific name Tayassuidae derives from the same source as the Portuguese tajaçu.

== Characteristics ==
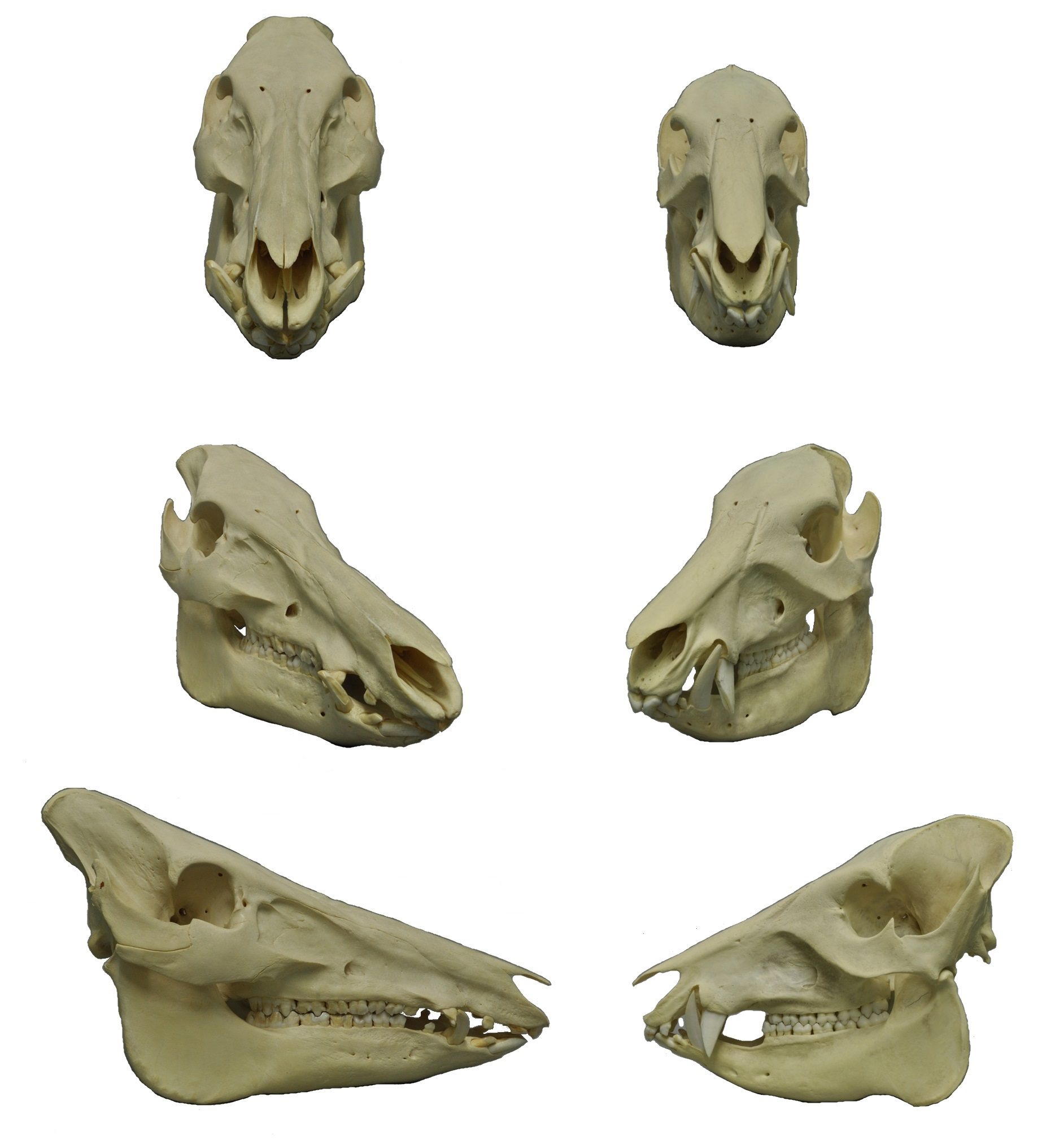
Skulls of wild boar (left) and white-lipped peccary (right): Note how the upper canines of the peccary point downwards.

A peccary is a medium-sized animal, with a strong resemblance to a pig. Like a pig, it has a snout ending in a cartilaginous disc and eyes that are small relative to its head. Also like a pig, it uses only the middle two digits for walking, although, unlike pigs, the other toes may be altogether absent. Its stomach is not ruminating. Though it has three chambers, it is more complex than those of pigs. Peccaries are foregut fermenters (pigs are hindgut fermenters). This foregut fermentation, similar to but separately evolved from a ruminant, is an example of convergent evolution.

Peccaries are omnivores and will eat insects, grubs, and occasionally small animals, although their preferred foods consist of roots, grasses, seeds, fruit and cacti, particularly prickly pear. Pigs and peccaries can be differentiated by a number of characteristics, including tails and ear shape. The ears of pigs are large and upright and often pointed while the ears of peccaries are small and rounded. Pigs also have tasseled tails, but peccaries' tails are small and discreet.

The most noticeable difference between pigs and peccaries is the shape of the canine teeth, or tusks. In European pigs, the tusks are long and curve around on themselves, whereas in peccaries, the tusks are short and straight and interlock with each other, prohibiting side-to-side movement of the jaw. The jaws and tusks of peccaries are adapted for crushing hard seeds and slicing into plant roots, and they also use their tusks to defend against predators. The dental formula for peccaries is: 2.1.3.33.1.3.3

By rubbing the tusks together, they can make a chattering noise that warns potential predators to stay away.

Peccaries are social animals, often forming herds. Over 100 individuals have been recorded for a single herd of white-lipped peccaries, but collared and Chacoan peccaries usually form smaller groups. Such social behavior seems to have been the situation in extinct peccaries as well. The giant peccary (Pecari maximus) of Brazil appears to be less social, primarily living in pairs. Peccaries rely on their social structure to defend territory, protect against predators, regulate temperature, and interact with other members of the species.

Peccaries have scent glands below each eye and another on their backs, though these are believed to be rudimentary in P. maximus. They use the scent to mark herd territories, which range from 30 to 280 hectares (75 to 700 acres). They also mark other herd members with these scent glands by rubbing one against another. The pungent odor allows peccaries to recognize other members of their herd, despite their myopic vision. Their very poor eyesight may make them appear to be charging when they are trying to escape. The odor is strong enough to be detected by humans, which earns the peccary the nickname of "skunk pig".

== Species ==
=== Extant species ===
Three (possibly four) living species of peccaries are found from the Southwestern United States through Central America and into South America and Trinidad, each in their own genus.

- Tayassu
  - White-lipped peccary (T. pecari)
- Catagonus
  - Chacoan peccary (C. wagneri)
- Dicotyles
  - Collared peccary (D. tajacu)

The collared peccary (Dicotyles tajacu), or "musk hog", referring to the animal's scent glands, occurs from the Southwestern United States into South America and the island of Trinidad. The coat consists of wiry peppered black, gray, and brown hair with a lighter colored "collar" circling the shoulders. They bear young year-round, but most often between November and March, with the average litter size consisting of two to three offspring. They are found in many habitats, from arid scrublands to humid tropical rain forests. The collared peccary is well-adapted to habitat disturbed by humans, merely requiring sufficient cover. They can be found in cities and agricultural land throughout their range.

Notable populations exist in the suburbs of Phoenix and Tucson, Arizona, where they feed on ornamental plants and other cultivated vegetation. Urban populations also live as far north as Sedona, Arizona, where they have been known to fill a niche similar to raccoons and other urban scavengers. In Arizona they are often called by their Spanish name "javelinas". Collared peccaries are generally found in bands of 8 to 15 animals of various ages. They defend themselves if they feel threatened, but otherwise tend to ignore humans.

A second species, the white-lipped peccary (Tayassu pecari), is mainly found in rainforests of Central and South America, but also known from a wide range of other habitats such as dry forests, grasslands, mangrove, cerrado, and dry xerophytic areas. The two main threats to their survival are deforestation and hunting.

The third species, the Chacoan peccary (Catagonus wagneri), is found in the dry shrub habitat or Chaco of Paraguay, Bolivia, and Argentina. The Chacoan peccary has the distinction of having been first described based on fossils and was originally thought to be an extinct species. In 1975, the animal was discovered in the Chaco region of Paraguay. The species was well known to the native people.

A fourth as yet unconfirmed species, the giant peccary (Dicotyles maximus), was described from the Brazilian Amazon and north Bolivia by Dutch biologist Marc van Roosmalen. Though relatively recently discovered, it has been known to the local Tupi people as caitetu munde, which means "great peccary which lives in pairs". Thought to be the largest extant peccary, it can grow to 1.2 m (4 ft) in length. Its pelage is completely dark gray, with no collars whatsoever. Unlike other peccaries, it lives in pairs, or with one or two offspring. However, the scientific evidence for considering it as a species separate from the collared peccary has later been questioned, leading the IUCN to treat it as a synonym.

During the Late Pleistocene, two extinct peccaries, Mylohyus and Platygonus, were widespread across North America (and in the case of Platygonus, South America), but became extinct at the end of the Pleistocene around 12,000 years ago following the arrival of humans.

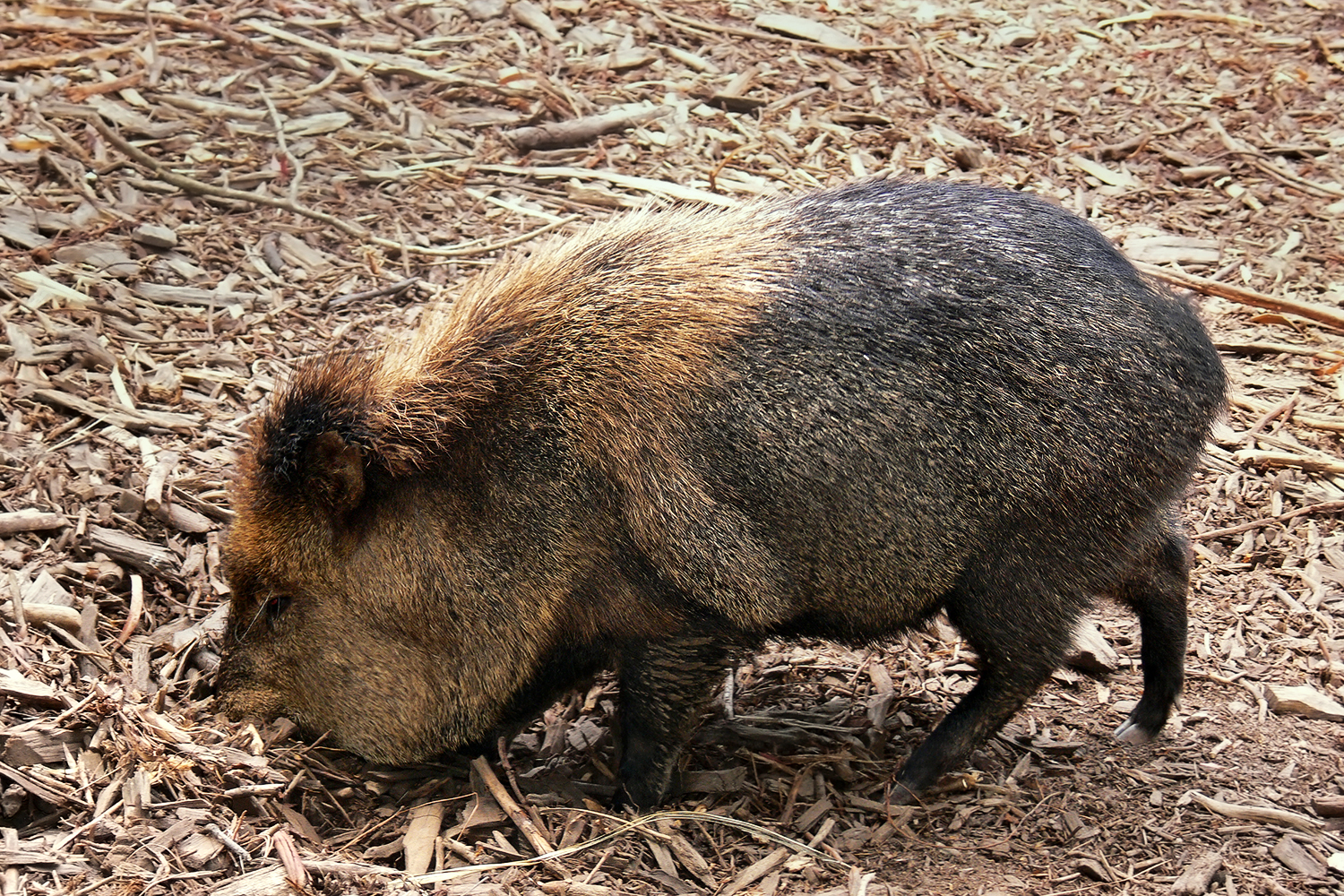
Collared peccary

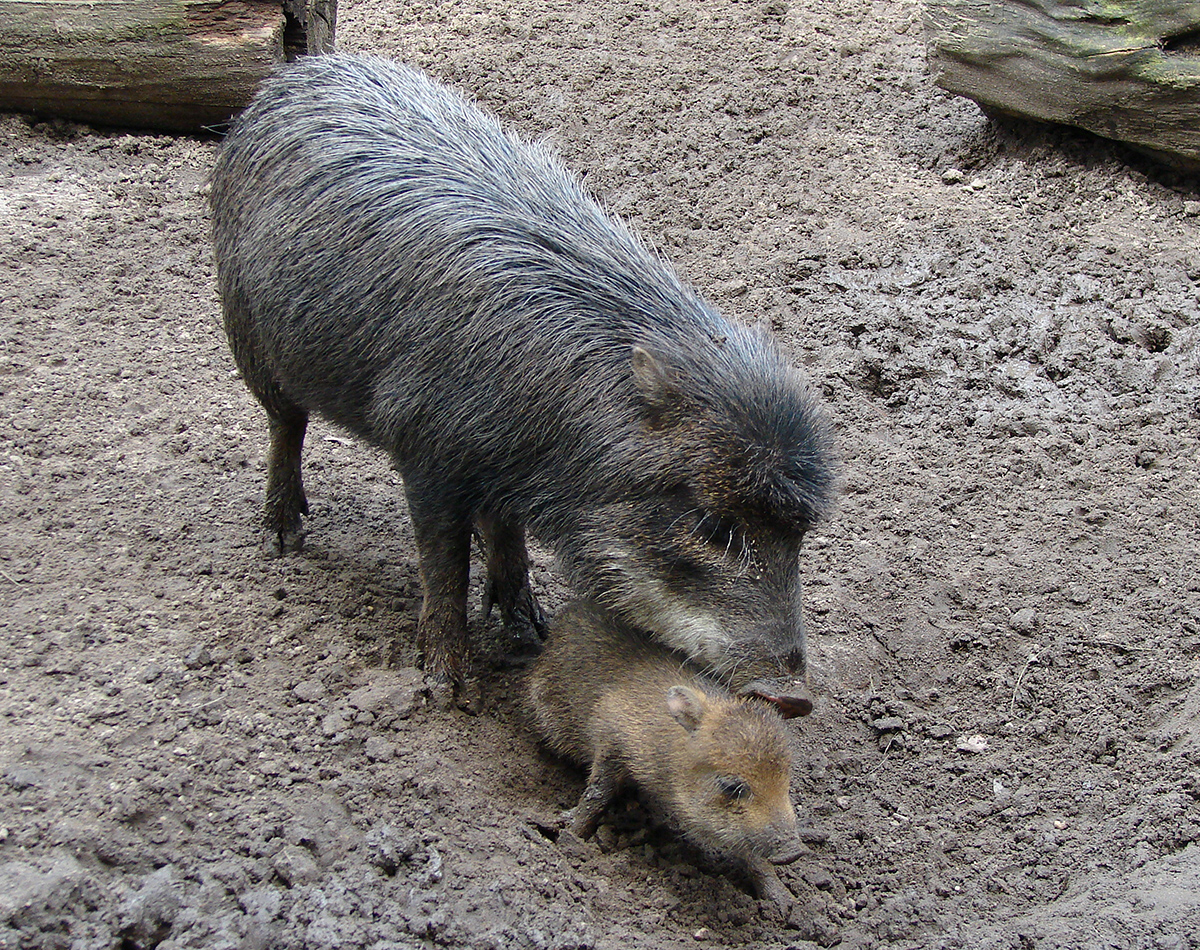
White-lipped peccary

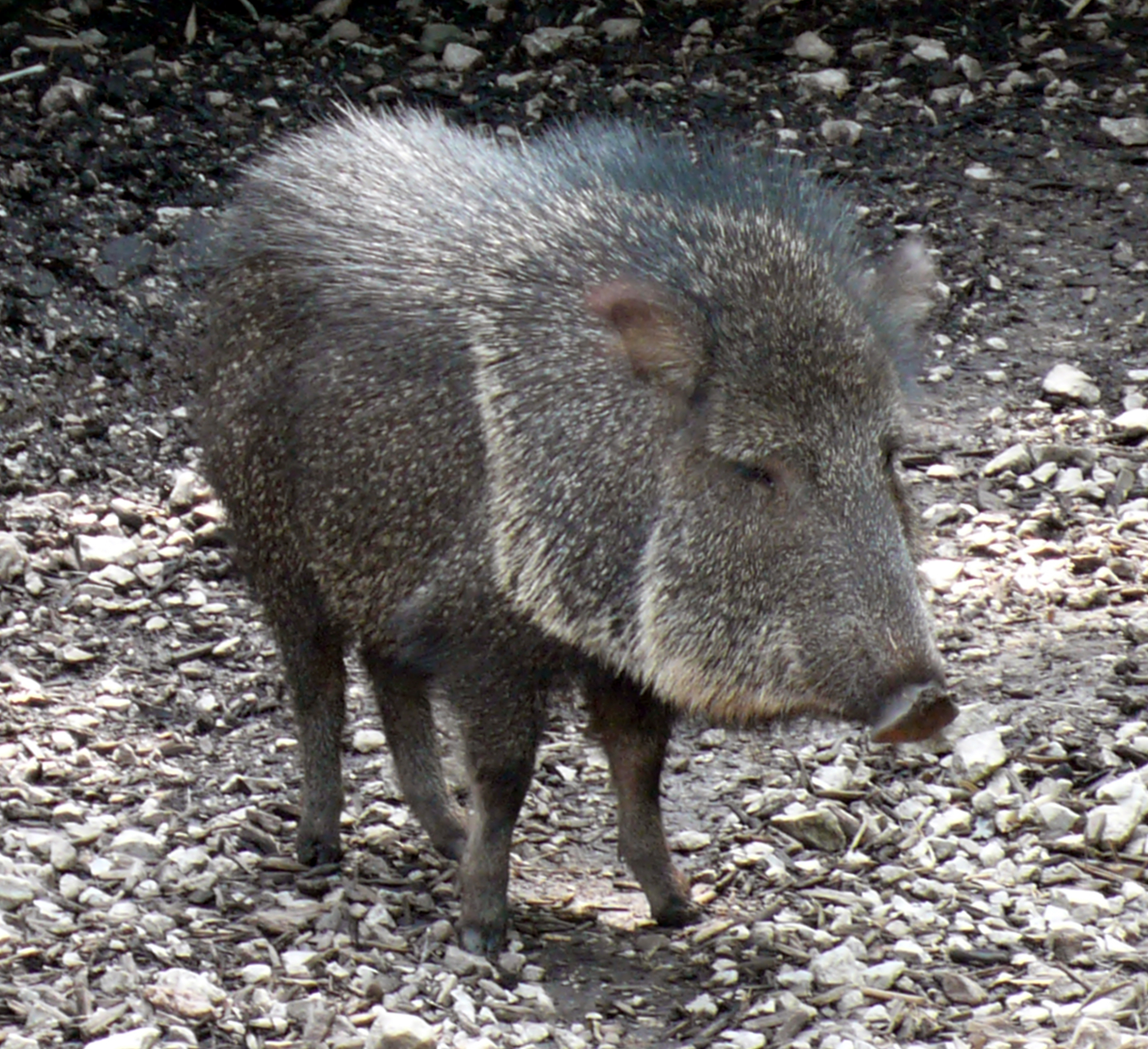
Chacoan peccary

=== Extinct genera ===
In addition, Tayassuidae have a well-attested fossil record, and numerous extinct genera are known.

- †Egatochoerus? (placement uncertain)
- †Perchoerus? (placement uncertain) (= †Chaenohyus)
- †Simojovelhyus
- †Thinohyus
- †Subfamily Hesperhyinae
  - †Cynorca
  - †Desmathyus
  - †Floridachoerus
  - †Fremdohyus
  - †Hesperhys
  - †Lucashyus
  - †Marshochoerus
  - †Stuckyhyus
  - †Wrightohyus
- Subfamily Tayassuinae
  - †Brasiliochoerus
  - †Catagonus
  - †Colbertchoerus
  - †Dyseohyus
  - †Macrogenis
  - †Mckennahyus
  - †Mylohyus
  - †Platygonus
  - †Prosthennops
  - †Protherohyus
  - †Skinnerhyus
  - †Stirtonhyus
  - †Tedfordhyus
  - †Webbochoerus
  - †Woodburnehyus

== Evolution ==
Although some taxa from the Old World like the European Miocene Taucanamo have been suggested to be members of Tayussidae, their assignation to the group is equivocal, with a 2017 phylogenetic analysis recovering Taucanamo outside the clade containing suids and peccaries. The oldest unambiguous fossils of peccaries are from the Early Miocene of North America, with the North American Eocene-Oligocene genus Perchoerus, also often considered an early peccary, recovered outside the clade containing peccaries and suids.

Although common in South America today, peccaries did not reach there until about three million years ago during the Great American Interchange, when the Isthmus of Panama formed, connecting North America and South America. At that time, many North American animals—including peccaries, llamas and tapirs—entered South America, while some South American species, such as the ground sloths and opossums, migrated north. Several species of peccary across the genera Platygonus and Mylohyus remained in North America until their extinction at the end of the Pleistocene. Today, two of the three species are relegated to the Neotropical realm, but the collared peccary ranges into northern Mexico and the southwestern United States.

== Domestication ==
Peccaries bear a familial resemblance to true pigs due to their common ancestry and are in the same suborder as swine (Suina). They have been present in South America since prehistoric times. The earliest scientific description of peccaries in the New World is in Brazil in 1547, in which they are referred to as "wild pigs".

It has been documented that peccaries were tamed, penned, and raised for food and ritual purposes in the Yucatán, Panama, the southern Caribbean, and Colombia at the time of the Conquest. Archaeological remains of peccaries have been found in Mesoamerica from the Preclassic (or Formative) period up until immediately before Spanish contact. Specifically, peccary remains have been found at Early Formative Olmec civilization sites.

The peccary is not readily suitable for modern captive breeding, lacking suitable characteristics for intensive or semi-intensive systems. Peccaries require a higher age before they are able to give birth (parturition) and have a tendency towards infanticide.

== Relation with feral pigs ==
The demographic dynamics of the interaction between feral pig populations and those of the two native species of peccaries (collared peccary and white-lipped peccary) is obscure and is still being studied. The existence of feral pigs could somewhat reduce predation by jaguars on peccary populations, as jaguars show a preference for hunting pigs when they are available.

== Uses of peccary leather in the fashion industry ==
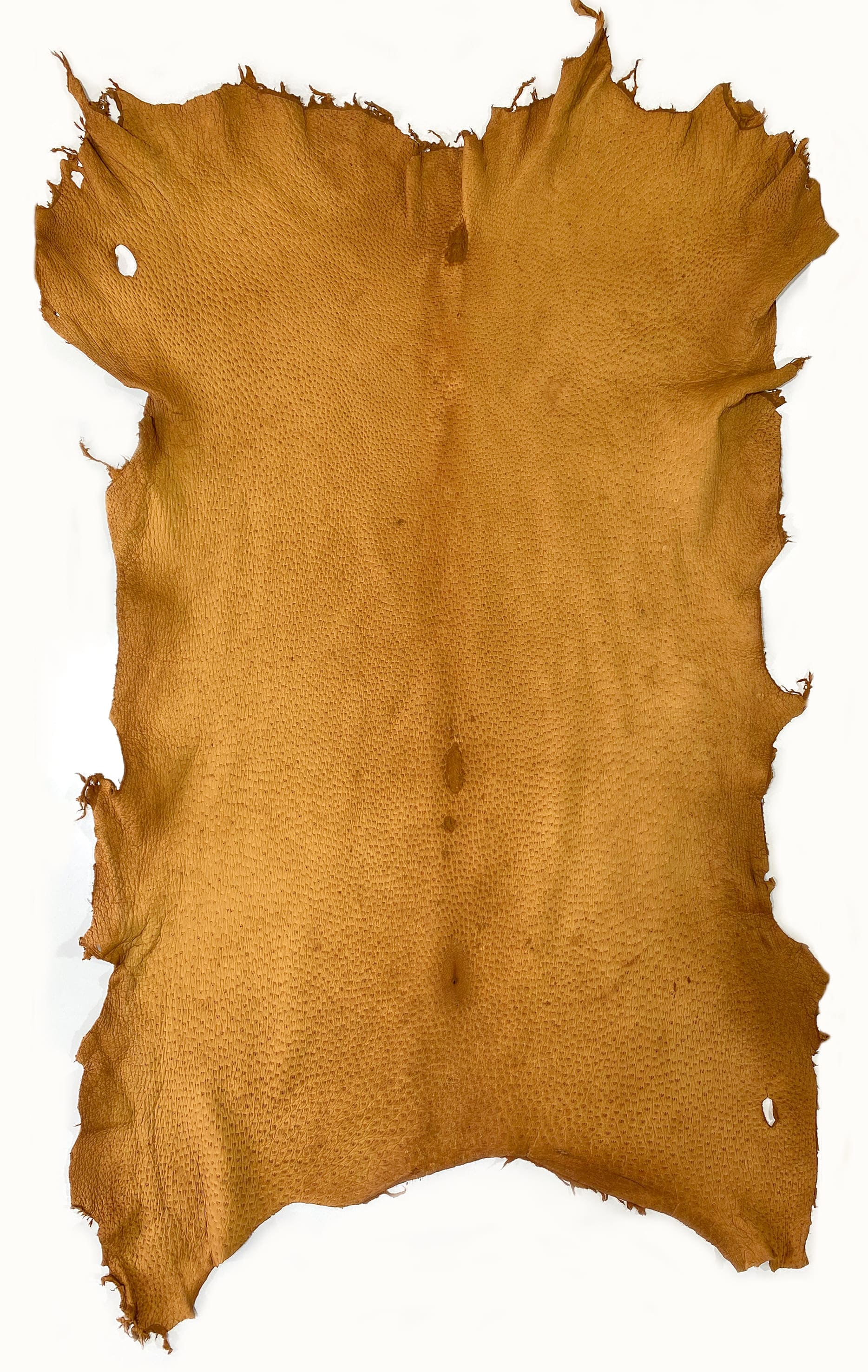
A piece of peccary leather

Peccary hide, recognizable by its distinctive three-pronged pore structure, is regarded as one of the finest leathers in the world, and is particularly prized in the luxury goods industry. Unlike standard Cowhide, peccary leather possesses a natural elasticity that allows finished products to conform precisely to the shape of the body without losing their form.

The highest-quality skins are sourced from Peru, and their trade is subject to documented quotas issued under CITES permits. This restricted supply, combined with the difficulty of processing the hide, contributes to peccary leather commanding significantly higher prices than most other leathers on the market.
