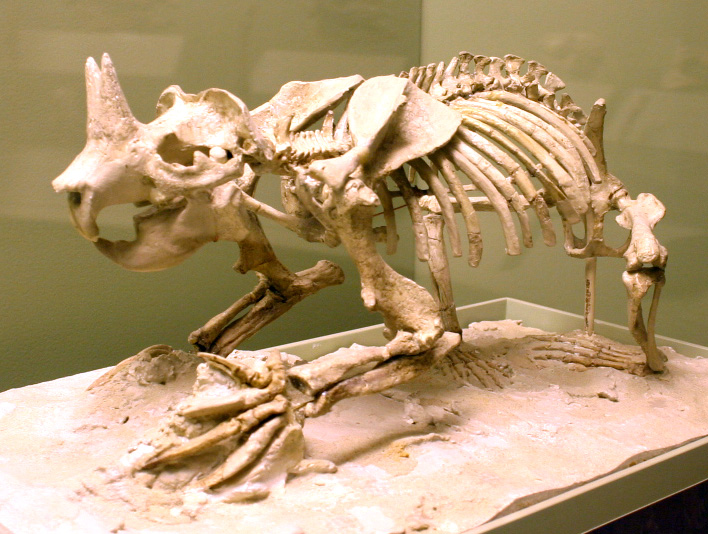
- Ceratogaulus hatcheri skeleton, Museum of Natural History, Washington D.C.

Scientific classification
- Kingdom: Animalia
- Phylum: Chordata
- Class: Mammalia
- Order: Rodentia
- Family: †Mylagaulidae
- Genus: †Ceratogaulus; Matthew, 1902

Species
- C. anecdotus Korth, 2000; C. cornutasagma Calede & Samuels, 2020; C. hatcheri Gidley, 1907; C. minor Hibbard & Phillis, 1945; C. rhinocerus Matthew, 1902

Synonyms
- Epigaulus

= Ceratogaulus =

Ceratogaulus Temporal range: Late Miocene to Early Pliocene, 16.3–5.3 Ma

Extinct genus of rodents

Ceratogaulus is an extinct genus of rodents, a member of the extinct fossorial (burrowing) rodent family Mylagaulidae. Ceratogaulus is one of two rodent genera with horns (along with fellow mylagaulid Mylagaulus) and is the smallest known horned mammal. Ceratogaulus lived in North America from the late Miocene to the early Pliocene epochs, 16.3 to 5.3 million years ago. Ceratogaulus (and to a lesser extent Mylagaulus) have sometimes been nicknamed "horned gophers", though they are only distantly related to true gophers.

== Description ==
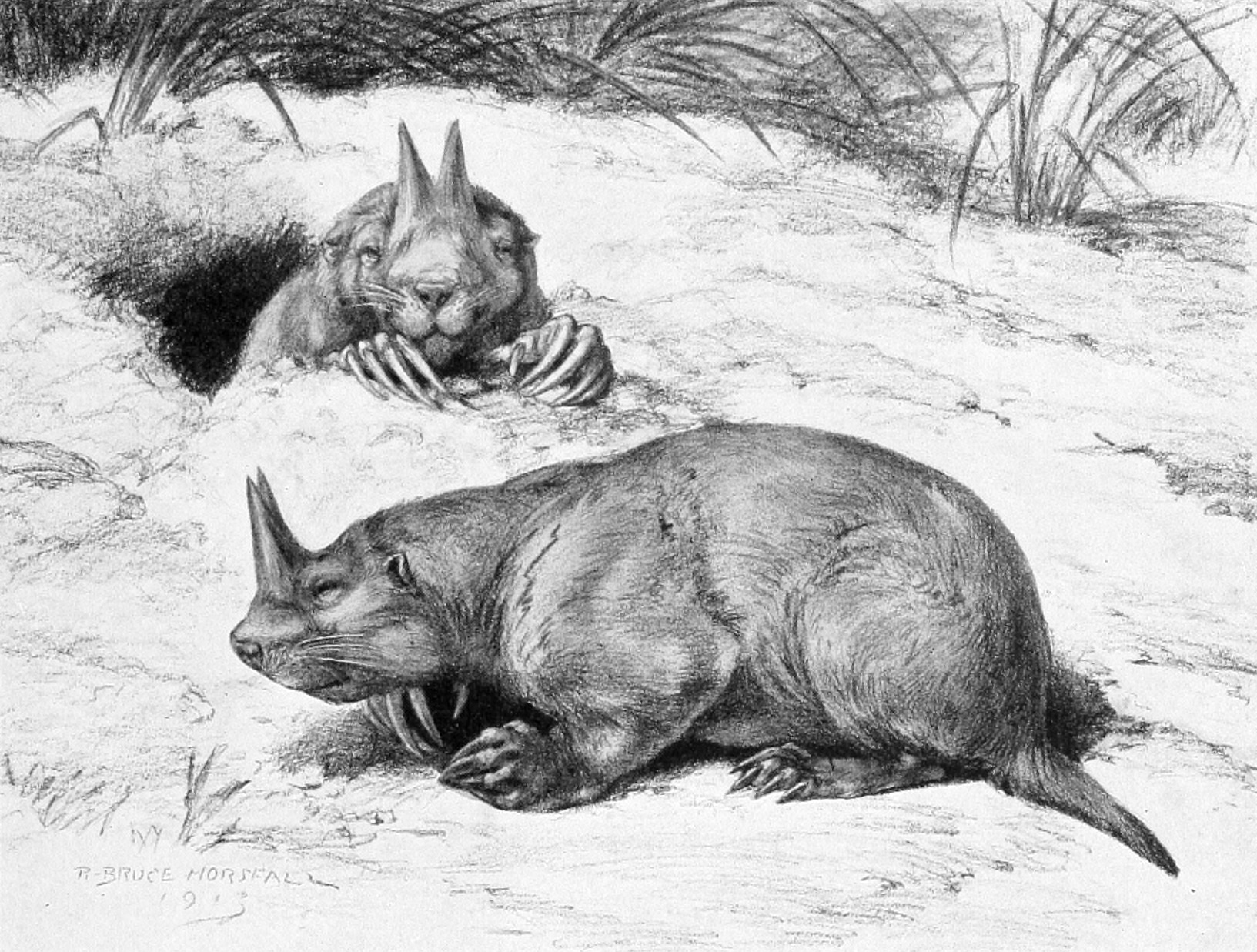
Reconstruction of a pair of C. hatcheri.

Ceratogaulus had two horns; these were large (in comparison to body size), paired, and originated from the nasal bones. Myagaulids are the smallest known horned mammals and the only known rodents ever to have had horns (aside from the related genus Mylagaulus, which has one horned species, M. cornusaulax ). They are also one of only two known horned fossorial mammals, the other being Peltephilus, an extinct genus of armadillo. They were native to what is now the Great Plains of North America, mostly Nebraska.

The role of the horns of Ceratogaulus is subject to much speculation. Several functions have been hypothesized (see below for a more detailed analysis) including digging, mating displays or combat, and defense from predators. The horns are not sexually dimorphic and multiple analyses support a role in defense.

In other respects, the animals most resembled modern marmots. They were approximately 30 centimetres (0.98 ft) long, and had paddle-like forepaws with powerful claws adapted for digging. They also had small eyes, and probably had poor eyesight, similar to that of a mole. These features, and some formal analyses of their morphology, suggest that they were likely burrowing animals.

== Possible roles of the horns ==
=== Digging ===
The nasal horns of Ceratogaulus are inconsistent with use as a digging tool. In recent mammals that use their heads for excavating, the tips of their snouts are used like a spade to scrape at the substrate. Therefore, the only modification of the nasal bones is a slight thickening of the anterior tips. Although it is theoretically possible that some mammal might develop horns as a digging tool, digging horns would differ from the Ceratogaulus horns in position and shape.

Ceratogaulus horns are positioned on the posterior ends of the nasal bones and extend dorsally, perpendicular to the plane of the palate. As a result of their posterior position, using the horns to dig would bring the anterior tip of the nasals against the substrate after a very short sweep of the horns, making digging with the horns extremely inefficient. This motion would be even more inefficient than suggested because the anterior surface of a burrow is concave, making it essentially impossible to use the horns without the anterior end of the snout interfering. The expectation is that an animal using its horns anteriorly (rather than dorsally) would have the occipital plate positioned vertically or tilted posteriorly. In this configuration, the effective input lever is maximized when the head is lowered, as in the rhinoceros skull.

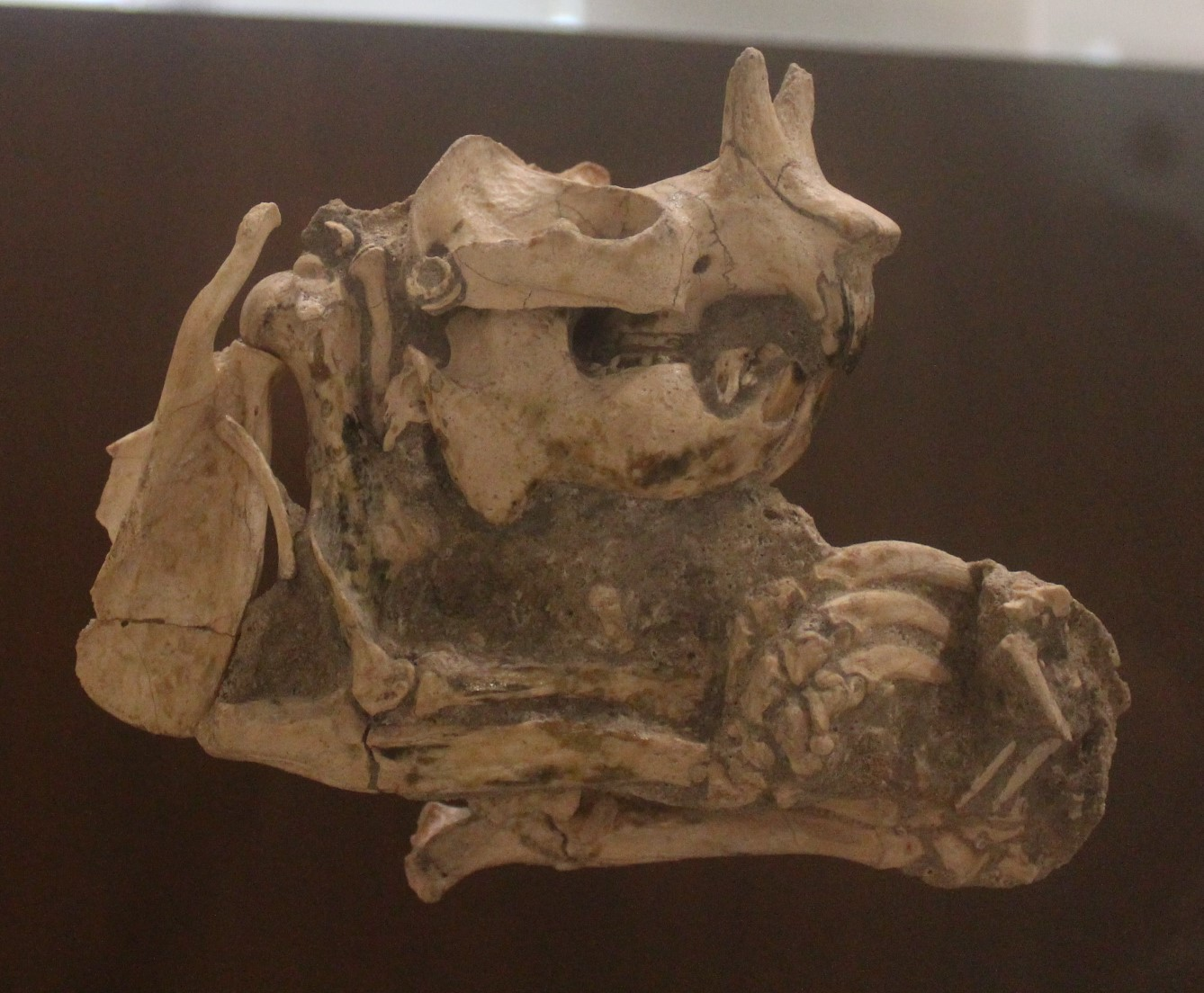
Ceratogaulus rhinocerus fossil

The shape of the horn itself is also very poor for a digging tool. The horns are thick and broad with large, flat anterior and posterior surfaces. Dragging such a broad tool through the soil would create immense resistance, proportional to the large surface area presented to the substrate. Finally, the Ceratogaulus horn becomes more posteriorly positioned through time, so that the evolutionary trend is towards a horn which becomes more poorly suited to digging through time, rather than better suited. Thus, the argument that the horns functioned in digging is not supported by the morphology or the evolutionary progression.

=== Mating displays or combat ===
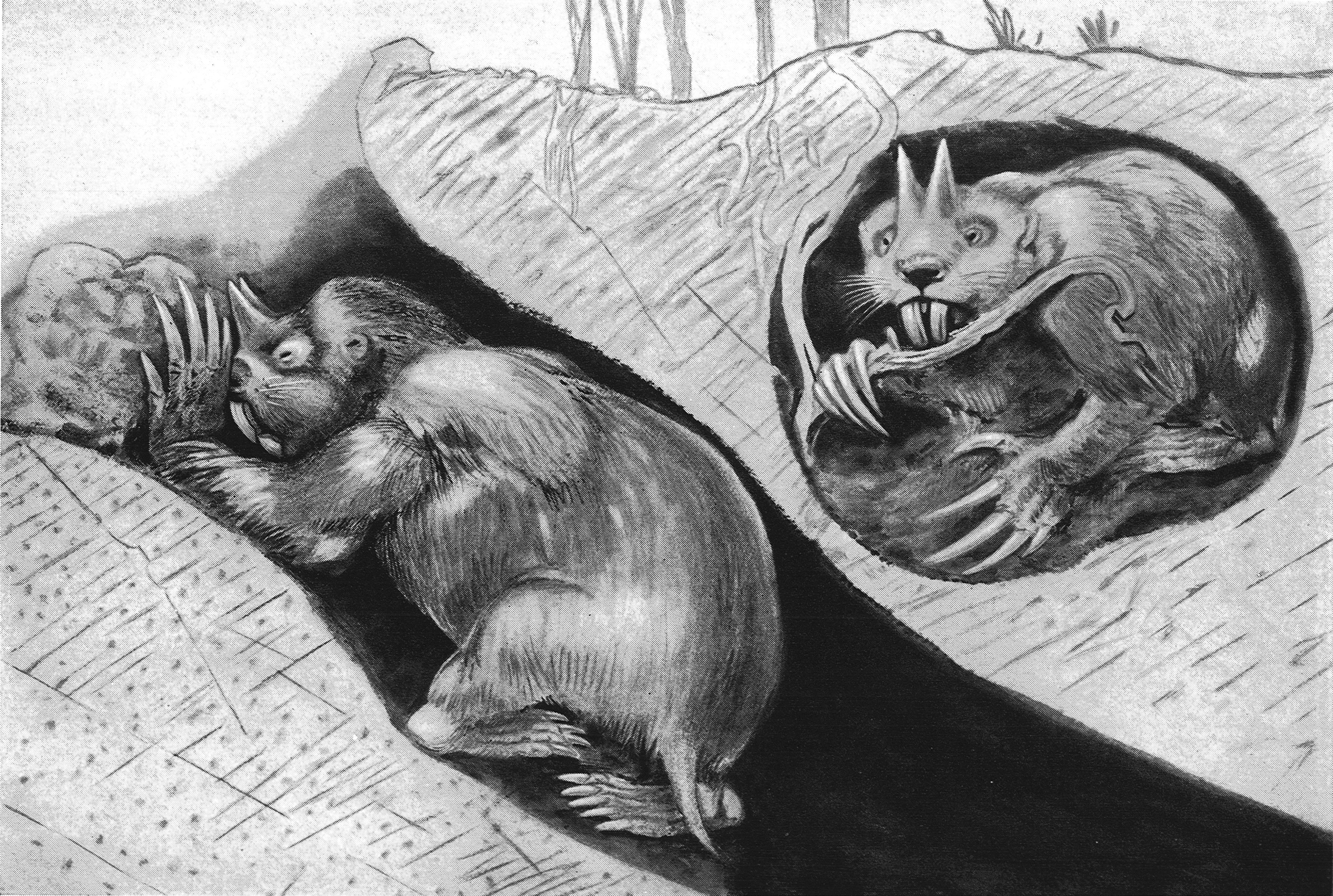
1931 restoration of two burrowing C. hatcheri

Many of the objections that apply to the horns as a digging implement also apply to the use of the horns in sexual combat. Their orientation and position and the morphology of the rest of the skull make it exceedingly difficult to bring them to bear on an opponent of similar size. The cervical vertebrae are shortened anteroposteriorly in all mylagaulids (a feature inherited by Ceratogaulus from ancestral, head-digging mylagaulids), decreasing the flexibility and range of motion of the neck and making it even more difficult for Ceratogaulus species to wrestle with their horns. Many ungulates with horns ill-suited to sexual combat still use them for combat or for sexual display. However, a sexually selected use of the horns is unlikely in Ceratogaulus, as the optic foramen is very small, roughly one-half to two-thirds the size of that of the mountain beaver, Aplodontia rufa, which itself has very poor vision. The small size of the optic foramen indicates extremely poor visual acuity, meaning the females would be unlikely to be able to visually recognize a winner in any sexual displays or sexual combat by the males.

=== Defense ===
Horns are used in defense against predators by almost all horned mammals. Animals will use any weapons at their disposal to fight off predators, and the horns of Ceratogaulus are well suited to defense. The horns are broad and robust, and their dorsal orientation and relatively posterior position makes them well suited to protecting the vulnerable eyes and neck. By elevating the head dorsally, the horns would be snapped backward, protecting the areas most commonly attacked by predators. A similar use of posterodorsal horns has been indicated to decrease predation in horned lizards. As the horns grow taller through evolutionary time, they also become more posteriorly positioned and the height of the occipital plate increases, increasing the leverage for lifting them. By positioning the horns more posteriorly, the output lever is shortened and, because the muscles used to rotate the skull dorsally attach at the top of the occipital plate, the input lever is lengthened. Thus, the dorsal strike with the horns would be more powerful as the ratio of output lever to input lever would be increased. Predation is the dominant cause of mortality in most small mammals, so the benefits provided by a mechanism to reduce predation could offset the substantial evolutionary cost of horns in a fossorial mammal.
