= List of political parties in Denmark =

This article lists political parties in Denmark.

Denmark has a multi-party system, with two or three major parties complemented by several other significant parties. The government typically consists of a major party in coalition with, or supported by, a number of smaller parties. No party has won an outright majority since 1903. All governments since then have either been one-party minority governments or coalitions between two or more parties. The last majority government was the Cabinet of Hilmar Braunsgaard 1968−1971.

The Ministry of the Interior and Housing registers and validates party names and the official party letters for all parties that participate in national elections. On ballots, the parties are sorted alphabetically by party letter.

Folketing election from 1918-2020.

== Parties represented in the Folketing or the European Parliament ==
List of members of the Folketing, 2026–present.

Party		Election symbol	Leader	Ideology	Position	Representation	
Party		Election symbol	Leader	Ideology	Position	Folketing	MEPs
	Social Democrats; Socialdemokratiet	A	Mette Frederiksen	Social democracy	Centre-left	38 / 179	3 / 15
	Green Left; Socialistisk Folkeparti	F	Pia Olsen Dyhr	Democratic socialism; Green politics; Popular socialism	Centre-left to left-wing	20 / 179	3 / 15
V	Venstre	V	Troels Lund Poulsen	Conservative liberalism; Nordic agrarianism	Centre-right	18 / 179	2 / 15
	Liberal Alliance; Liberal Alliance	I	Alex Vanopslagh	Classical liberalism; Right-libertarianism	Centre-right to right-wing	15 / 179	1 / 15
	Danish People's Party; Dansk Folkeparti	O	Morten Messerschmidt	Danish nationalism; National conservatism; Right-wing populism	Right-wing to far-right	16 / 179	1 / 15
M	Moderates; Moderaterne	M	Lars Løkke Rasmussen	Liberalism	Centre to centre-right	14 / 179	1 / 15
C	Conservative People's Party; Det Konservative Folkeparti	C	Mona Juul	Conservatism; Social conservatism; Liberal conservatism	Centre-right	13 / 179	1 / 15
	Red–Green Alliance; Enhedslisten – De Rød-Grønne	Ø	Collective leadership	Eco-socialism; Anti-capitalism; Marxism	Left-wing to far-left	11 / 179	1 / 15
	Danish Social Liberal Party; Radikale Venstre	B	Martin Lidegaard	Social liberalism	Centre to centre-left	10 / 179	1 / 15
	Denmark Democrats; Danmarksdemokraterne	Æ	Inger Støjberg	National conservatism; Right-wing populism; Nordic agrarianism	Right-wing to far-right	10 / 179	1 / 15
Å	The Alternative; Alternativet	Å	Franciska Rosenkilde	Green politics	Centre-left to left-wing	5 / 179	0 / 15
	Citizens' Party; Borgernes Parti	H	Lars Boje Mathiesen	Right-wing populism; Anti-immigration; Anti-Islam	Far-right	1 / 179	0 / 15
Faroe Islands
	Union Party; Sambandsflokkurin	SP	Bárður á Steig Nielsen	Conservative liberalism; Nordic agrarianism; Danish unionism	Centre-right	1 / 179	—N/a
	Social Democratic Party; Javnaðarflokkurin	JF	Aksel V. Johannesen	Social democracy; Danish unionism	Centre-left	1 / 179	—N/a
Greenland
	Inuit Ataqatigiit (Community of the People)	IA	Múte Bourup Egede	Greenlandic independence; Democratic socialism; Environmentalism	Left-wing	1 / 179	—N/a
	Naleraq	NA	Pele Broberg	Greenlandic nationalism; Unilateralism; Populism	Centre to centre-right	1 / 179	—N/a

== Parties without Folketing or European Parliament representation ==
Election symbol	Party name	Recent results			Ideology	Leader
Election symbol	Party name	Folketing	MEPs	Municipal	Ideology	Leader
D	New Right; Nye Borgerlige	129,524 (3.7%)	did not run	10 / 2,436	National conservatism; Right-libertarianism; Hard euroscepticism	Susanne Borggaard
K	Christian Democrats; Kristendemokraterne	18,276 (0.5%)	did not run	11 / 2,436	Christian democracy; Environmentalism	Jeppe Hedaa
Q	Independent Greens; Frie Grønne	31,787 (0.9%)	did not exist	did not run	Green politics	Sikandar Siddique
N	People's Movement against the EU; Folkebevægelsen mod EU	did not run	102,101 (3.7%)	did not run	Hard Euroscepticism; Sovereignty	Susanna Dyre-Greensite
S	Schleswig Party; Slesvigsk Parti; Schleswigsche Partei	did not run	did not run	10 / 2,436	Regionalism; German minority interests	Rainer Naujeck

=== Minor parties ===
Party name	Election Symbol	Party logo	Founded	Ideology	Leader
A United Country; Et Samlet Land			2022		Thomas Lindhardt
Active Democrats; Aktive Demokrater			2022		Tim Werner Hansen
Agerskovgruppen; Agerskovgruppen			2011		Jens Peter Aggesen, Thorkild Fink
Allied Democratic Party; Allierede Demokratiske Parti			2022		Phillip Andersen Vad
Bacon and beer party Bacon og øl partiet			2022		David Clemmensen
Cannabis Party; Hampepartiet	J		2001	Cannabis legalisation	Klaus Trier Tuxen
Center Democrats; Centrum Demokraterne			2022		Peter Hjorth
CenterParty; CenterPartiet	CP		2009	Centrism	Per Schultz-Knudsen
Children of the Planet; Planetens Børn			2022		Helle Egberg Mikkelsen
Citizen vote Borgerstemme			2024		Karsten Højstrup Nielsen
Citizens' Party - Lars Boje Mathiesen; Borgernes Parti - Lars Boje Mathiesen			2024		Lars Boje Mathiesen
Citizens' People's Party; Borgernes Folkeparti			2022		Jørgen Einar Mikkelsen
Civic Center; Borgerligt Centrum			2024		Hans-Henrik Nielsen
Common Party; Fælles Partiet			2022		Peter Duffy Obel
Common Sense; Sund Fornuft			2024		Kjetil Andre Fleten
Communist Party; Kommunistisk Parti (KP)			2006	Communism; Marxism-Leninism; Anti-revisionism	Lotte Rørtoft-Madsen
Communist Party in Denmark; Kommunistisk Parti i Danmark (KPiD)	N		1990	Communism; Marxism-Leninism	Party dissolved in 2023
Communist Party of Denmark, CPD; Danmarks Kommunistiske Parti (DKP)	K or DKP		1919	Communism; Marxism-Leninism	Rikke Carlsson
Conservative Socialists; Konservative Socialister			2021		Lord Nicolai Geert Stubtoft
Children Prioritized; Children Prioritized			2024		Alvin Anthony Virgo
Danish Liberals; Danske Liberale			2021		
Danish Pirate Party; Dansk Pirat Parti			2022		Lasse Kirkeby Langholz
Danish Technocratic Party; Dansk Teknokratisk parti			2023		Steffen Henckel Brander
Danish Unity; Dansk Samling	R (DS)		1936	Nationalism; National conservatism	Morten Uhrskov Jensen
Democratic Alliance; Demokratisk Alliance			2024		Jakob Rosholm Schmidt
Democratic Balance; Demokratisk Balance			2023		Mikkel Ruhr Lind
Democratic Future; Demokratisk Fremtid			2024		Thomas Birkholm
Democratic Mimosas; Demokratiske Mimoser			2023		Flemming Dan Ast
Democratic People's Party; Demokratisk Folkeparti			2021		Eckardt Missel
Democratic Welfare Party; Demokratisk Velfærdsparti			2023		Didi Lassen
Denmark 2.0; Danmark 2.0			2022		Mads Carl Malik Makungo Grosos Chambuso
Denmark In Balance; Danmark I Balance			2021		Birgit Irene Nielsen
Denmark's National Conservative Party; Danmarks Nationalkonservative Parti			2021		Ole Kristensen
Denmark's Social Liberal Party - Free Democrats; Danmarks Socialliberale Parti – Frie Demokrater			2023		Erik Humblebug
Dicillin Party; Dicillin Partiet			2023		Jonas Emil Rask Andersen
Digital Civil Disobedience; Digital Civil Ulydighed			2022		Kenneth Højmark Bæk
Direct; Direkte			2022		Maja Kristine Klingenberg
Puppet Party; Dukkepartiet			2014	Big tent	Unspecified
E-democracy; E-demokratiet			2022		Christian Houmann Hansen
Eat Sand; Spis Sand			2021		Unspecified
Elin; Elin – Energibalance Logistisk Innovation Nybrud			2024		John Kragelund
Fair Safe Denmark; Fair Trygt Danmark			2024		Karsten Vedelskov
Flex; Flex			2023		Thomas Holm Nakapizye Madsen
Folkeringen; Folkeringen			2016	Democratic socialism	Steen D. Hartmann
For Freedom; For Frihed			2015	Anti-Islam	Nicolai Sennels
For Human Rights and Freedoms; For Menneskerettigheder og Frihedsrettigheder			2021		Daniel Reinhard Vetö
Free Choice; Frit Valg			2021		Thomas Lau Jensen
Free Community; Frit Fællesskab			2023		Allan Jensen
Free Danes; Frie Danske			2021		
Free Discourse; Fri Diskurs			2021		Stig Tanggaard Hansen
Free Greens, Denmark's New Left Wing Party; Frie Grønne, Danmarks Nye Venstrefløjsparti			2023		Sikandar Siddique
Freedom List; Frihedslisten	Æ		2021	Regionalism; Humanism; Civil libertarianism Vaccine hesitancy Liberalism	Flemming Blicher
Freedom and Prosperity; Frihed og Velstand			2023		Leif Barbré Knudsen
Frederikshavn Party; Frederikshavn Partiet			2024		Samantha Eriksen
Futoria; Futoria			2023		Albert Ratan Møller
Green Alliance; Grøn Alliance			2022		Lærke Lina Skovbjerg
Green Democrats; Grønne Demokrater			2024		Theresa Birgitta Brønnum Scavenius
Green Future; GrønFremtid			2023		Kim Johnsen
Green liberals Grønne liberale			2021		Jette Caroline Hartvig Jacobsen
Hard Line; Stram Kurs	P		2017	Ethnic nationalism Identitarianism; Anti-immigration	Rasmus Paludan
Højre, Denmark's Christian Party; Højre, Danmarks Kristelige Parti			2024		Ole Lyngvåg
In doubt I tvivl			2021		Adam Tønsberg
Independent Party; De Uafhængige	U		1953	Classical liberalism Anti-elitism	Knud Kristensen
International Socialists; Internationale Socialister	IS		1984	Marxism; Trotskyism; Democratic socialism	Red–Green Alliance, until 2015
International Socialists of the Climate Campaign; Klimakampens Internationale Socialister	KIS		2022		Niels Nielsen Hav
Justice Party of Denmark; Retsforbundet	E		1919	Georgism; Geolibertarianism; Hard Euroscepticism	Collective leadership, Poul Gerhard Kristiansen
Legalized abuse of power LegaliseretMagtmisbrug			2023		Tonny Sindahl-Jørgensen
Legally Liberal Society; Retsliberalt Samfund			2022		Jonatan Matthias Nikolai Vinterbæk
Liberal Center; Liberalt Centrum			2022		Lauritz Elias Hoffmann Nielsen
Libertarians; Libertarianer			2023		Jonas Ellehauge
List About; Liste Om			2022		Tobias Hallundbæk Petersen
Logos; Logos			2021		Rasmus Munch Søndergaard
National-Libertarian Alliance; National-Libertær Alliance			2024		Anton Aggerstrøm
National Party; Nationalpartiet			2026	Centrism Liberalism	Mikkel Sommer Larsen
National Socialist Movement of Denmark; Danmarks Nationalsocialistiske Bevægelse	DNSB		1991	Neo-Nazism	Esben Rohde Kristensen
Nationalist Party; Nationalistisk Parti			2023		Andreas Kim Finderup Christensen
New Agenda; Ny Agenda			2021		Philippe Albert Hesselmann
New Balance - Children and the Fathers' Party; Ny Balance - Børn og Fædrepartiet			2024		Søren Kai Dresmer-Hansen
New Citizens; Nye Borgerlige			2024		Martin Berg Henriksen
New Democracy; Nyt Demokrati			2021		Martin Dines Søegaard
New Direction; Ny Retning			2024		Sebastian Raun Mikkelsen
New Generation; Ny Generation			2023		Frederik Victor Nielsen
New Republicans; Nye Republikaner			2021		Jonas Kruse Erichsen
No to Islam in Denmark; Nej til Islam i Danmark			2021	Anti-Islam	Rasmus Paludan
Nordic Resistance Movement; Nordisk Modstandsbevægelse			2017	Anti-LGBT; Authoritarianism; Hard Euroscepticism; Neo-Nazism	Simon Lindberg; Jacob Vullum Andersen (DEN)
Nordic Strength; Nordisk Styrke			2019	Neo-nazism, Xenophobia, Militarism	Klas Lund
Now that's enough Nu er det nok			2024		Claus René Svendsen
People's Democrats; Folke Demokrater			2022		Adrian Janne Ladow Svensen
Opposition Denmark Party; Opposition Danmark Partiet			2023		Jørgen Lindhagen
Our Alliance; Vores Alliance			2022		Mathias Bruun Nielsen
People's Movement for Justice and Welfare; Folkebevægelsen Ret- & Velfærd			2006	Individualism; Social Individualism	Kristian Poul Herkild
People's Party JFK21; Folkepartiet JFK21	JFK21		2020	Liberalism; Civil libertarianism Regionalism; Humanism; Vaccine hesitancy	Mads Køie Palsvig
People's Socialist Alternative; Folkesocialistisk Alternativ			2008	Socialism, Euroscepticism	Erik Bach
Partiet Hansen Denmark; Partiet Hansen Danmark			2023		Knud Helge Hansen
Philosophical People's Party; Filosofisk Folkeparti			2021		Tue Kofoed-Enevoldsen
Pirate Party of Denmark; Piratpartiet	P		2009	Pirate politics	Ole Husgaard
Political Homeless; Politisk Hjemløs			2022		Lars Justesen
Political Revolution; Politisk Revolution			2023		Andreas Aaholm Hestdal Rye
Progress Party; Fremskridtspartiet	Z		1972	Right-wing populism National liberalism Neoliberalism; Anti-immigration; Anti-Islam	Niels Højland; Niels Michael Wingreen Christensen
Protest in lack of better Protest i mangel af bedre			2024		Johan Christian Høegh Wedell-Wedellsborg
Purple Front; Lilla Front			2021	Centrism, Liberalism, Social Progressivism	Lucas Nielsen
Pure Logic; Ren Logik			2022		Kasper Nordskilde
Radical Socialists; Radikale Socialister			2024		Magnus Aamand Andresen
Realistic; Realistisk			2023		Richard Bo Pedersen
Reintroduce Great Day of Prayer; Genindfør Store bededag			2023		Albert Garsdal
Revolutionary Socialists (since 2024 Revolutionary Communists); Revolutionære Socialister	RKP		2001	Communism, Marxism, Trotskyism, Revolutionary socialism	Collective leadership, Collective management
Scandinavian Union; Skandinavisk Union			2021		Markus Buch Nørgaard
Scientific Party; Scientific Party			2023		Anita Jensen
Social Balance; Social Balance			2012		Mette Valentin
Socialist Workers Party; Socialistisk Arbejderpolitik			1979	Communism, Trotskysm	Unspecified
Stable Democracy; Stabil Demokrati			2023		Jørn Nielsen
Stop Islamisation of Denmark; Stop Islamiseringen af Danmark			2005	Anti-Islam	Anders Gravers Pedersen
Super Health; Super Sundhed			2021		Philip Rossen
Action Party; Handlingspartiet			2023		Søren Harry Vergo
ADHD Party; ADHDpartiet			2022		Jesper Drevsholt
Baldists; Baldisterne			2023		Yassin Mohmad Ayoub
The Black Register; Det Sorte Register			2011	Tax Reform	Ole Eli Christiansen
Center Party; Midterpartiet			2023		Steen Walter Elkjær Jakobsen
Circle; Cirklen			2022		Maiken Smidt Madsen
Clumsiness Technocrats; Klamhedsteknokraterne			2022		Simon Stougaard
The Citizen List; Borgerlisten	E		2018/2019	Populism; Reformism	Klaus Riskær Pedersen
Change Party; Forandringspartiet			2023		Mie An-Mari Hertzberg
Chest Area Party; Brystpartiet			2024		Julie Cathrine Gerd Grove
Christian Democrats; Kristendemokraterne			2022		Jeppe Laurids Hedaa
Climate Party; Klimapartiet			2021		Palle Rasmus Jensen
Comrades; Kammeraterne			2022		Jan Tholstrup Outzen
Community Citizens; Samfundsborgerne			2023		Frederik Blicher Pedersen
Constitutional Party; Grundlovspartiet			2024		Jan Skeel
Cows' Liberation Front; Køernes Befrielsesfront			2023		Poul Wissing
Creatives; De Kreative			2021		
Culture Democrats; KulturDemokraterne			2024		Niclas Christian Aarestrup
The Danish Tartelet Association; Det Danske Tartelet Forbund			2022		Kalle Hald Raabjerg Bak
The Decent; De Ordentlige			2022		Kristian Nygaard Jensen
Democrats - all of Denmark must live Demokraterne – hele Danmark skal leve			2023		Theis Kaas Nielsen
Engine Party; Motorpartiet			2022		Lars Dyhre Schau
Equality Party; Ligestillingspartiet			2022		Allan Schmidt
Ethical People's Party; Ligestillingspartiet			2022		Karina Elisabeth Lindeberg
Exposed Party; Udsattepartiet			2023		Danny Weinreich Bendix Pedersen
Family Party; Familiernes Parti			2021		Cecilie Michele Albrecht
Future Party - Make Denmark better Fremtidspartiet - Gør Danmark bedre	FP		2024		Helmuth Nyborg Sørensen
The good party Det gode parti			2022		Gorm Bregninge
Health Party; Sundhedspartiet			2022		Morten Tvergaard
Heart Party; Hjertetsparti			2022		Michael Svend Ove Christiansen
Home Party; Hjemme partiet			2022		Melanie Angie Pate
The Humanist Party; Det Humanistiske Parti	H		1984		
Humanist Party; Partiet Humanisterne			2021		
The Impartial; De Upartiske			2022		Niklas Kline Lange Frost
Insight Party; Indsigtspartiet			2024		Peter Begtrup Lind
Justice Party; Justitspartiet			2022		Heidi Irene Frost Jepsen
Labor Party; Arbejderpartiet			2022		Hans Wincent
Landslide Party; Jordskredspartiet			2024		Thomas Clement-Christensen
the liberal right det liberale højre			2021		Jacob Sejersgaard-Jacobsen
Kalmar Democrats; Kalmar Demokraterne			2021		
Meat Party; Kødpartiet, Kødparti			2018		Unspecified
The Meaningful Society; Det Meningsfyldte Samfund			2024		Simon Tykgaard
Mercy Party; Barmhjertighedspartiet			2021		Kirsten Merrild
Million Party; Millionpartiet			2022		Nicolai Møller Selck
Modern Socialists; Modernesocialisterne			2024		Jan Thulstrup Hansen
Nihilists; Nihilisterne			2024		Per Kampmann
Patriots Go Live; Patrioterne Går Live			2023		Unspecified
Party of Community Mind for Freedom; Partiet Samfundssind for Frihed			2024		Jesper Lausdahl Birk
The Party - The Big Plan; Partiet – Den Store Plan			2024		Gert Broxgaard
Party for the Abolition of the Ministerial Pension; Partiet for Afskaffelsen af Ministerpensionen			2021		Niklas Meulengracht Madsen
Kronborg Party; Partiet Kronborg			2021		Unspecified
Party of Life; Livets Parti			2022		Michael Øhlers Christiansen
Responsibility Party; Ansvarspartiet			2023		Johnny Brian Nielsen
Peace Party; Fredspartiet			2022		Tino Brahmer Svendsen
People's Church Party; Folkekirkepartiet			2024		Lars Raahauge
People's Citizen's Wage; Folkets Borgerløn			2023		Kaj Verner Pedersen
People's Nation; Folkets-Nation			2022		Kim Serritzlev
People's Party for Petty Tyrants and Paper Pushers; Folkepartiet for Skrankepaver og Papirnussere			2024		Benjamin Bjørn Ewe
People's Party for Peace and Freedom; Folkepartiet for Fred og Frihed			2023		Bjarne Holm
Pensioners' Party; Pensionisternes Parti			2024		Karl Åge Skåning Jensen
Phoenix Party; Fønix Partiet			2023		Niels Karl Hammerich
Plant Party; Plantepartiet			2021		Kenneth Ibsen
Progress Party; Fremskridtspartiet			2022		Niels Michael Wingreen Christensen
Reform Party; Reformpartiet			2022		Joakim Niels Østergaard
The Republican People's Party; Det Republikanske Folkeparti			2023		Niels Roland Rasmussen
Senior Party; Seniorpartiet			2021		
The Social Liberals; De Socialliberale			2023		Johannes Vinzent Bonnesen
Social Sense Party; Partiet Samfundssind			2020		Vivian Anita Alexandru
The Socialists; Socialisterne			2022		Jannik Thomas Havsholm
Society's Party; Samfundets parti			2021		Henriette Wittenkamp
Solidarity Party; Solidaritets Partiet			2023		Henrik Søby Jensen
Sports & Association Party; Sports- & Foreningspartiet			2022		Martin Tronier-Jørgensen
Sun Party; Sol Partiet			2022		Kim Kolding Andersen
Super Party; Superpartiet			2022		Morten Tvergaard
The Synthetic Party; Det Syntetiske Parti	!		2022	Techno-populism; Transhumanism; Radical democracy	Leader Lars; Asker Bryld Staunæs
Utopians; Utopisterne			2022		Benjamin Müller
Vodka Party; Vodka Partiet			2022		Malthe Hansen
Wage Earner Party; Lønmodtagerpartiet			2023		Andreas Beck Holm
Welfare Party for the dignity of the elderly and children Velfærdspartiet for ældres og børns værdighed			2023		Claus Bording
Wish Party; Ønske Partiet			2021		Kirsten Meulengracht
World Democrats; Verdensdemokraterne			2024		John Harald Dybdal Jørgensen
Theta Service; Theta Service			2021		Mogens Svava
Think Danish; Tænk Dansk			2022		Jens Olaf Rye Hintze
True Red; Ægte Rødt			2024		Erik Risom
United Democrats; Forenede Demokrater	J		2013	Centre-left politics	Britta Johansson
Up; Oppe			2022		Jamilla Zabrina Meller
Visions-Partiet; Visions-Partiet			2002	Holism; Spirituality; Green politics	Fleming Nielsen, Benny Dyhr Thomsen
Visionary Alliance; Visionær Alliance			2023		Ciean Leslie Jayden Arkell
Volt Denmark; Volt Danmark			2018	Social liberalism Pro-Europeanism; European Federalism	Ina Hoogeland, Frederik Larsen, Alexander Nielsen
We are the People - who want Denmark; Vi er Folket – som vil Danmark			2023		Jan Vincentz Jensen
We Local Democrats; Vi Lokale Demokrater			2021	Localism	Unspecified
We who love and want to preserve Denmark; Vi der elsker og vil bevar Danmark			2021		Preben Poul Poulsen
Workers' Communist Party; Arbejderpartiet Kommunisterne			2000	Communism; Marxism-Leninism; Anti-Revisionism; Republicanism	Unspecified

=== Local parties ===
See List of regional and local political parties in Denmark

== Defunct parties ==
=== Formerly represented ===
The following lists defunct partiet that were previously represented in national parliament, in either the Folketing, Landsting or European Parliament.

Party name	Symbol	Logo	Founded	Dissolved	Ideology	Representation
Bjørnbakske Venstre; Bjørnbakkerne			1862	1877	Antimilitarism; Women's rights	Folketing: 1870s
Capital's Venstre; Hovedstadens Venstre	V		1947	1950		Folketing: 1947–1950
Center; Centrum						
Centre Democrats; Centrum-Demokraterne	D		1973	2008	Centrism; Liberal conservatism	Folketing: 1973–2001; European Parliament: 1979–1994
Christian Democrats; Kristendemokraterne	Q		1970			Folketing: 1971–2004
Clear Venstre; Rene Venstre			1884	1897	Liberalism	Folketing: 1887–1897
Common Course; Fælles Kurs, Arbejderpartiet Fælles Kurs	P		1986	2001	Communism; Euroscepticism; Populism	Folketing: 1987–1988
Communist Party of Denmark, (Denmark's Left Socialist Party); Danmarks Kommunistiske Parti, Danmarks Venstresocialistiske Parti), (DKP)	K (DKP)		1919			Folketinget: 1943–1988; Landstinget: 1947–1953
Communist Workers Party; Kommunistisk Arbejderparti	R (KAP)		1979	1981		Folketinget: 1979–1981
Danish Unity, Danish Collection, Dansk Samling	R (DS)		1936			Folketinget: 1939; 1943–1947
Democratic Renewal; Demokratisk Fornyelse	U		1998			
Free Conservatives; Frikonservative	FK		1900	1915	Conservatism	Landsting: 1900–1915
Free Social Democrats; De Frie Socialdemokrate			1919	1920		
Freedom 2000; Frihed 2000			1999	2001	Right-wing populism Anti-Islam	Folketing: 1999–2001 (Note: not registered as a party but represented in parliament as a parliamentary group)
Hansen's Venstre, Hansen's Left						Folketing: 1858–1861
Hard Line Tight Course; Stram Kurs, 2019	P		2017			
Humanist Party; Humanistiske Parti	H		1988	1990		Folketing: 1988–1990
Højre (1848–1866); Højre	H		1848	1866		Constituent assembly: 1848–1849; Folketing: 1849–1866; Landsting: 1849–1866
Højre (1881–1915); Højre	H		1881	1915		Folketing: 1881–1915; Landsting: 1882–1915
Independent Party; De Uafhængige	U		1953		Classical liberalism Anti-elitism	Folketing: 1960–1966
Industry Party; Erhvervspartiet	Ep		1918	1924	Populism	Folketing: 1918–1924
Industry Party; Erhvervspartiet	Ep		1978	1979	Populism	
Independent Venstre; Uafhængigt Venstre						Folketing: 1876–1879
June Movement; Juni Bevægelsen	J		1992	2009	Euroscepticism	European Parliament: 1994–2009
Justice Party of Denmark, Legal association Retsforbundet	E		1919			Folketinget: 1926–1981; Landstinget: 1951–1953
Left Socialists (The Left Socialists); Venstresocialisterne	Y (VS)		1967	2013	Socialism; Revolutionary socialism Anti-capitalism	Folketing: 1968–1971, 1975–1987
Liberal Centre; Liberalt Centrum	L (LC)		1965	1969	Liberalism	Folketing: 1966–1968
The Middle Party; Mellempartiet	L		1866	1876		Folketing: 1865–1870s
Moderate Venstre; Det Forhandlende Venstre	F		1877	1910		Folketing: 1879–1910; Landsting: 1878–1910
National Cooperative; Nationalt Samvirke	NS		1939	1941		Folketinget: 1939
National Liberal Party; De Nationalliberale			1842	1882	National liberalism	Constituent Assembly: 1948–1849; Folketing: 1849–1872, 1876–1881; Landsting: 1849–1882
National People's Party; Nationale Folkeparti	NF		1943	1943		
National Socialist Workers' Party of Denmark; Danmarks Nationalsocialistiske Arbejderparti; DNSAP)	N (DNSAP)		1930	1945	Nazism; Fascism	Folketing: 1939–1945
National Venstre; Nationale Venstre				1870	Liberalism; Economic liberalism	Folketing: 1865-1870
Peace Politics People's Party; Fredspolitisk Folkeparti	M		1963	after 1971	Pacifism	Folketing: 1964
People's Movement against the EU, The People's Movement against the EU; Folkebevægelsen mod EU	N		1972			EU Parliament: 1979-2019
People's Venstre; Folkelige Venstre			1866			Folketing: 1865–1870
Progress Party; Fremskridtspartiet	Z (FrP)		1972			Folketing: 1973–1999
Social Balance; Social Balance			2012			
Society of the Friends of Peasants; Bondevennernes Selskab			1846	1872	Agrarianism, liberalism	Constituent assembly: 1848–1849; Folketing: 1849–1860s Landstings: 1849–1860s
Socialist Working Group; Socialistisk Arbejdsgruppe	SA		1979			
Socialist Workers Party; Socialistisk Arbejderparti			1968	1970		
Centre Democrats; Centrum-Demokraterne	M (D)		1973	2008		Folketing: 1973–2001
The Center Party of Denmark; Centerpartiet			1978	1979		Folketing: 1978–1979
The Citizen List; Borgerlisten, Klaus Riskær Pedersen (2019)	E		2018/2019			
The Greens; De Grønne	G		1987	2001		Folketing: 1987–2001
The Minority Party; Minoritetspartiet	M		2005			
Farmers' Party; Bondepartiet	F		1934	1945		Folketing: 1934–1945; Landstinget: 1939-1945
Tscherning's Venstre						Folketing: 1858–1872
Venstre of the Folketing; Folketingets Venstre				1895	Liberalism; Conservative liberalism	Folketing: 1879–1895
Venstre Reform Party; Venstrereformpartiet			1870	1910		Folketing: 1898–1910; Landsting: 1898–1910

=== Marginal parties ===
The following lists defunct parties that were never represented in national parliament.

Party name	Symbol	Logo	Founded	Dissolved	Ideology
Communist Party of Denmark/Marxist–Leninists; Danmarks Kommunistiske Parti Marxister-Leninister	DKP/ML		1978	2006	Communism; Marxism-Leninism; Anti-revisionism; Hoxhaism
Communist Unification; Kommunistisk Samling	KS		2005	2006	Communism; Marxism-Leninism; Anti-revisionism; Hoxhaism
Communist Working Circle; Kommunistisk Arbejdskreds	KAK		1963	1978/1980	Communism; Marxism-Leninism; Anti-revisionism; Hoxhaism
Communist Workers Party; Kommunistisk Arbejderparti	R		1967	1994	Communism; Marxism-Leninism; Anti-revisionism; Hoxhaism
Danish People's Party; Dansk Folkeparti			1941	1943	Corporativism; Anti-communism
Danish People's Party; Dansk Folkeparti			1993	1993	
Danish Unity; Dansk Samling	R (DS)		1936		
Democratic Party; Det Demokratiske Parti			2012	2015	Social conservatism Civic conservatism Centrism; Communitarianism; Euroscepticism; Political nordism (Scandinavism)-Nordic model
Farmer's Party; Landmandspartiet			1924		
Folkeringen			2016		Democratic socialism
Fokus; Miljøpartiet Fokus	M		2010	2015	Green politics Animals rights Animal welfare
Forward; Fremad			2019	2020	Liberalism; Classical liberalism Pro-Europeanism
Hard Line, Tight Course; Stram Kurs, 2019	P		2017		
Libertarian Socialists; Libertære Socialister	LS		2009	2017	Anarcho-communism; Platformism; Especifismo; Libertarian Socialism; Anarcho-Syndicalism; Social Anarchism; Social insertion
Marxist–Leninist Unity League; Marxistisk-Leninistisk Enhedsforbund			1972	1975	
National Unity Party; National Samling Parti			1938	1938	
New Alliance; Ny Alliance	Y		2007	2008	Social liberalism Social conservatism Centrism
Party of the Danes; Danskernes Parti			2011	2017	Ethnic nationalism Neo-Nazism
Pensioners' Party; Pensionistpartiet	P		1976	1980	
The Autonomy Party; Selvstyrepartiet, Selvstyrebevægelsen			1926		
Social Balance; Social Balance			2012		
Socialist Labor Policy; Socialistisk Arbejderpolitik, SAP			1980	2014	
Socialist Workers Party; Socialistisk Arbejderparti (1981, 1984 & 1987)					
The Citizen List; Borgerlisten, Klaus Riskær Pedersen (2019)	E		2018/2019		
The Greens; De Grønne			1983	2014	Ecology; Local Democracy
The Independent Social Democracy of Denmark; Det Uafhængige Socialdemokrati			1918		
The Minority Party of Denmark; Minoritetspartiet	M		2000	2007	Humanism
The New Right; Det Nye Højre			1918		
The Social Party, Social Party; Samfundspartiet			1935		
Trivselspartiet; Trivselspartiet			1990	1999	
Union of Conscientiously Work-Shy Elements; Sammenslutning af Bevidst Arbejdssky Elementer			1979	1998	Political satire
Vegan Party; Veganerpartiet	G		2018	2022	Veganism; Green politics Ecocentrism; Single-issue politics

== See also ==
- Politics of Denmark
- Elections in Denmark
- Lists of political parties

- List of political parties in Greenland
- List of political parties in the Faroe Islands
- List of regional and local political parties in Denmark
- Category:Youth wings of political parties in Denmark

- Liberalism and radicalism in Denmark
