= The Autonomy Party (Denmark) =

The Autonomy Party or The Autonomy Movement (Danish: Selvstyrepartiet or Selvstyrebevægelsen) was a Danish party in Southern Jutland which was founded in 1926 by Cornelius Petersen. The party wanted to abolish democracy and establish a Schleswigian republic with a national dictatorship based on The 10 commandments and the Code of Jutland of the Codex Holmiensis. The party ran in the 1926 general election in Haderslev-Aabenraa-Sønderborg-Tønder county constituency without first collecting any voter declarations, as the party used a rule in the Danish Parliamentary Election Act of 1920 stating that political parties from Southern Jutland could stand without the usual requirement for voter declarations. In the election, the party received 2,117 out of 66,843 valid votes in the constituency, corresponding to 3.2% of the votes in the county constituency, or 0.16% of the votes in all of Denmark. The party later joined the National Socialist Workers' Party of Denmark.
