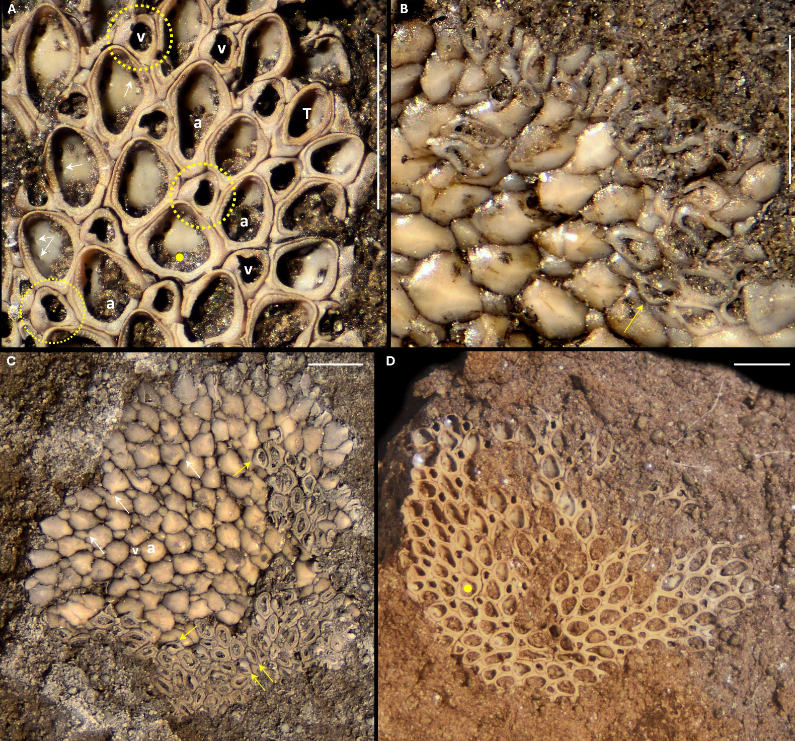
- Various photos of Gramipora laxevincta

Scientific classification
- Kingdom: Animalia
- Phylum: Bryozoa
- Family: incertae sedis
- Genus: †Gramipora; Lin et al., 2026
- Species: †G. laxevincta

Binomial name
- †Gramipora laxevincta Lin et al., 2026

= Gramipora =

Gramipora Temporal range: Late Miocene

Extinct genus of free-living bryozoan

Gramipora is an extinct free-living bryozoan from the Late Miocene of Denmark, with unknown affinities. It is a monotypic genus, containing only Gramipora laxevincta.

== Discovery and naming ==
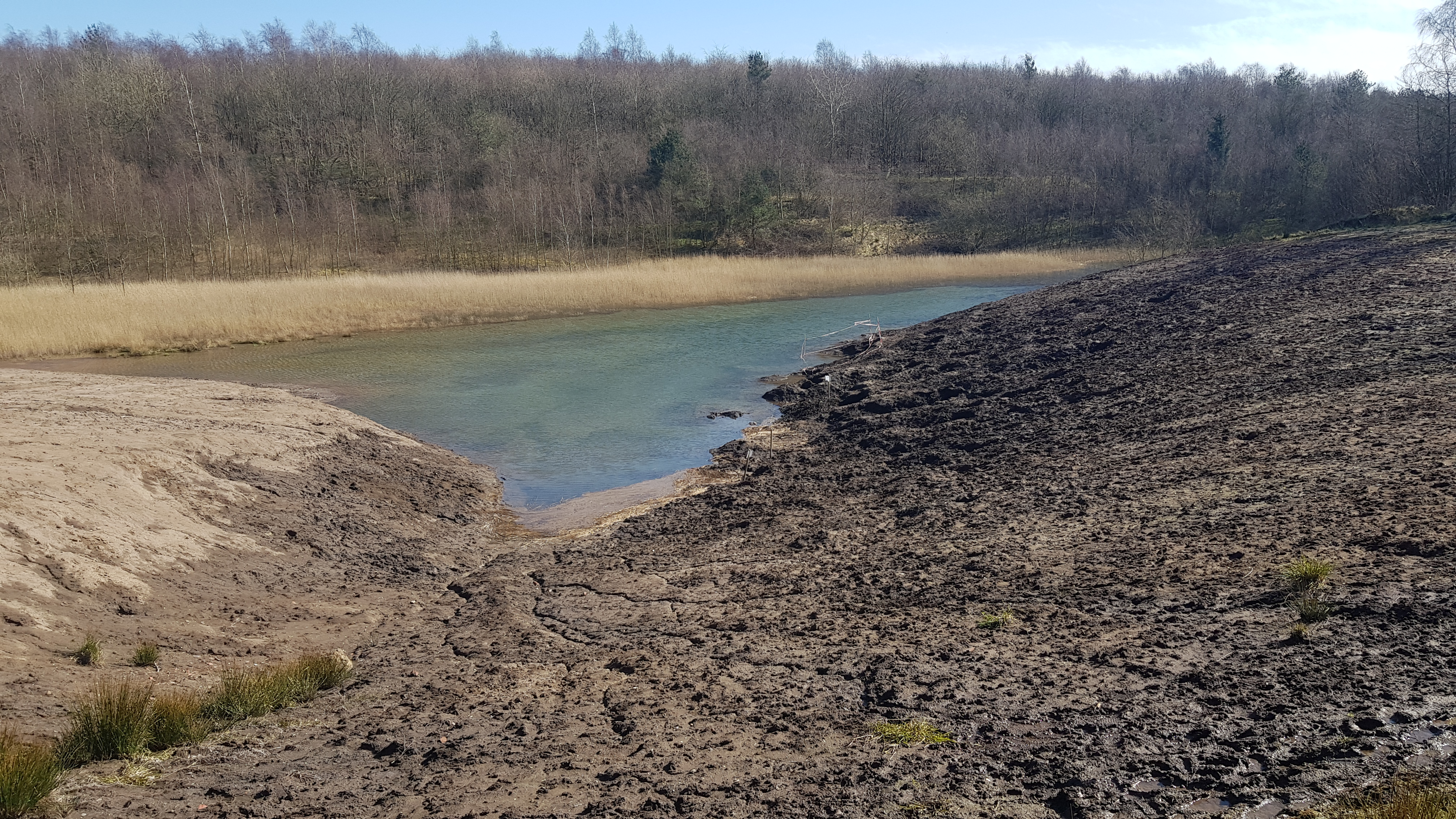
Gram Formation

The holotype material for Gramipora was found in the Gram Clay Pit of the Gram Formation, Denmark, and was formally described and named in 2026.

The generic name Gramipora derives from the type locality Gram Formation, where the fossils were found; and the common suffix used for bryozoan genera, "pora". The specific name laxevincta derives from the Latin words "laxe", to mean loosley; and "vinctus", to mean bound, in reference to the loose construction of the fossils.

== Description ==
Gramipora laxevincta is a unattached bryozoan colony, possibly getting larger in area than 1 cm^{2} (0.2 sq in), and is bilamellar in nature. The colony is formed of two very distinct layers, a frontal layer composed of two types of evenly distributed zooids, whilst the ab-frontal layers is composed of a chaotic, uneven distribution of kenozooids. The frontal zooids are interpreted to be large autozooids, alongside smaller vibracula, both ranging in morphology and size, which occasionally lead to kenozooids filling in any left-over spaces.

Both layers bud in a way to form fan-shaped patterns, both originating in the colony margin and uncoordinated with each other. It is thus noted the ancestrula are possibly marginal, although this remains uncertain. The connection between both layers is also noted to be very limited.

== Affinities ==
Due to its unique morphology, there are no known extinct or extant families Gramipora can reliably be placed into, and as such its lifestyle is also uncertain, though the researchers that described it suggested it to be that of a free-living bryozoan, being loosely comparable to the extinct Biselenaria.
