= Clear Venstre =

Danish political party

- Founder: Christen Berg
- Founded: 1884
- Split from: Venstre of the Folketing
- Merged into: Venstre Reform Party

Clear Venstre or Clear Left (Danish: Rene Venstre), also known as Bergske Venstre or Bergske Left, was a political group from 1884 to 1897. It was one of two groups splitting from Venstre of the Folketing in 1884, the other being Moderate Venstre.

== History ==
Clear Venstre was founded by Christen Berg in 1884, after Venstre of the Folketing split into two groups, with Berg leading one group and Viggo Hørup leading the other. Clear Venstre opposed the government of Jacob Estrup. Among politicians joining Berg's group were Theodor Leth, Jens Christian Christensen, Ingvard Jensen, Kristen Jensen-Try and Peter Jensen-Stengaarden. The group would later attempt to cooperate with the Moderate Left, with the cooperation called "the Danish Left" (Danish: Det Danske Venstre)

Berg remained the leader of the group until his death in 1891, after which Jens Christian Christensen took over the leadership. Even after the group joined the Venstre Reform Party, it wasn't officially dissolved and Christensen remained the front figure of the group.

== Leaders ==
No.	Portrait	Leader	Took office	Left office	Time in office
1	Christen Berg	Christen Berg (1829–1891)	1884	1891	6–7 years
2	Jens Christian Christensen	Jens Christian Christensen (1856–1930)	1891	1897	5–6 years

== See also ==
- List of political parties in Denmark
- Politics of Denmark
