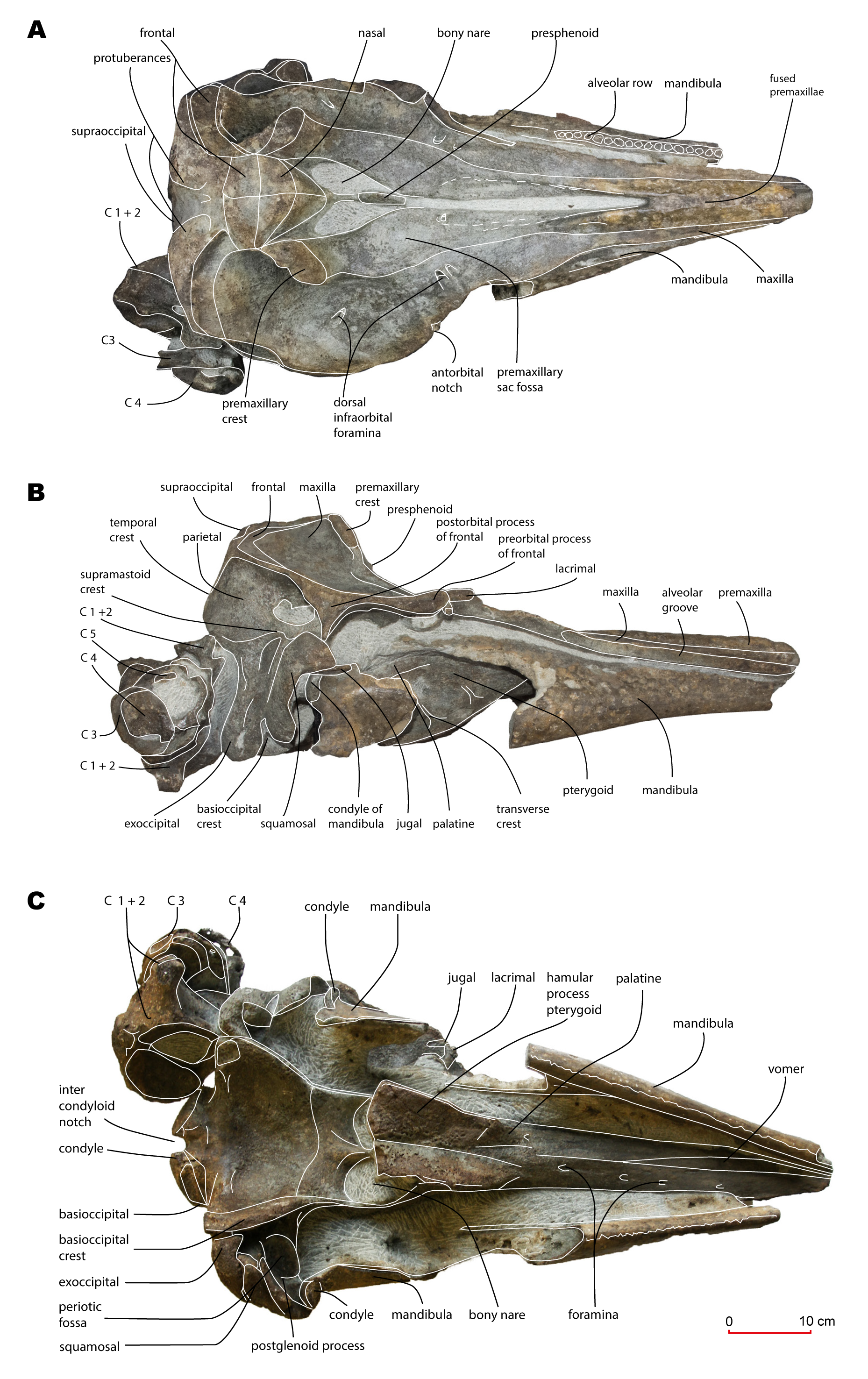
- Holotype cranium

Scientific classification
- Kingdom: Animalia
- Phylum: Chordata
- Class: Mammalia
- Order: Artiodactyla
- Infraorder: Cetacea
- Family: Ziphiidae
- Genus: †Flandriacetus; Post et al., 2025
- Species: †F. gijseni

Binomial name
- †Flandriacetus gijseni Post et al., 2025

= Flandriacetus =

Flandriacetus Temporal range: Late Miocene (Late Tortonian), 8.1–7.5 Ma

Extinct genus of beaked whale

Flandriacetus is an extinct genus of beaked whale from the Late Miocene epoch (Tortonian age) Diessen Formation of the North Sea Basin of the Netherlands. The genus contains a single species, Flandriacetus gijseni.

== Discovery and naming ==
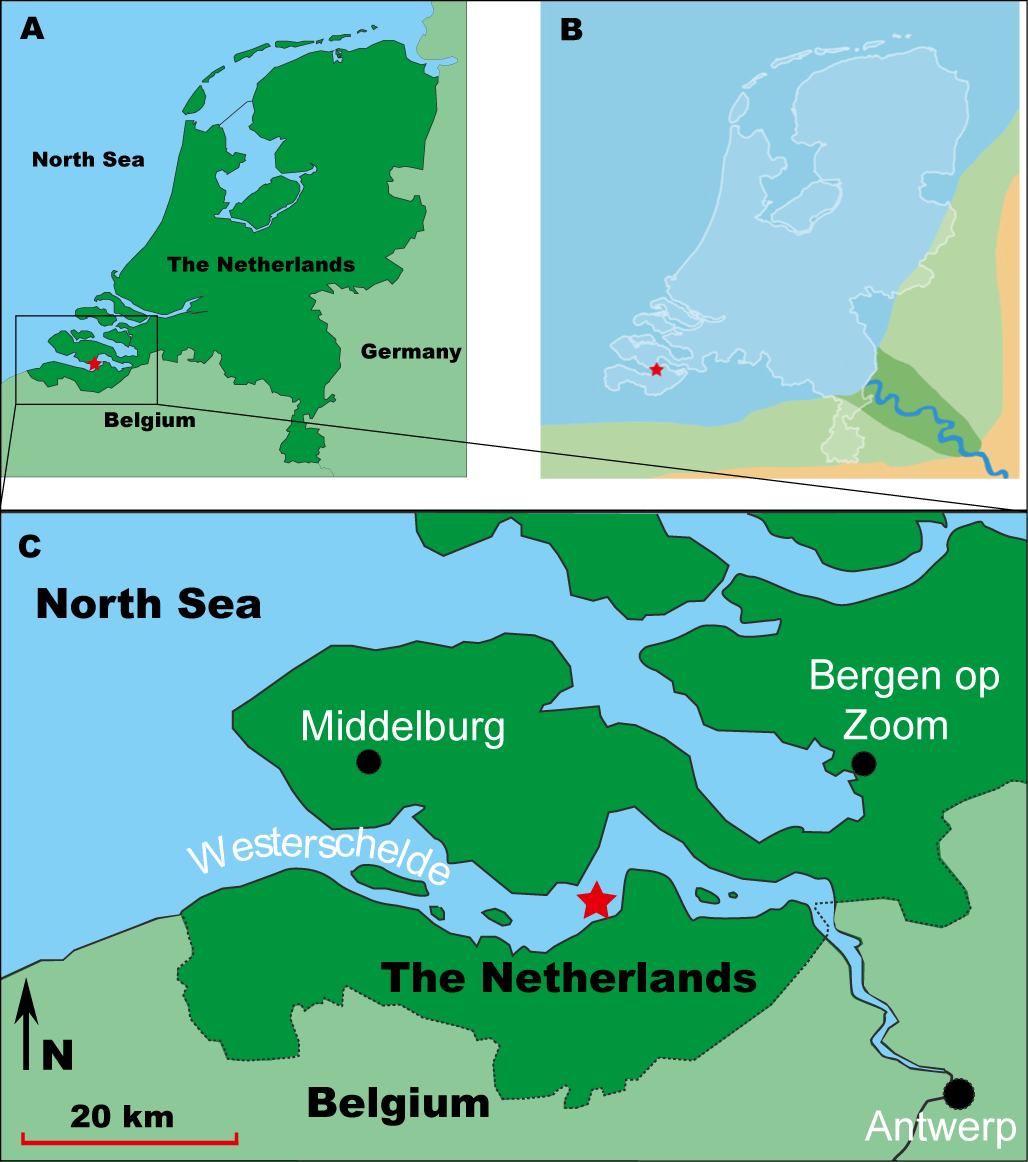
Type locality; B shows the region during the Late Miocene.

Flandriacetus is known from thirteen skeletons discovered between 2014 and 2019 in the Western Scheldt estuary of the Netherlands. The specimens were all enclosed in large blocks of glauconitic sandstone. The holotype specimen, NMR999100012016, comprises a well-preserved, almost complete skull, rostrum, and partial mandibles, and six vertebrae (cervical vertebrae 1–5 and one anterior thoracic vertebra). The apex of the rostrum, the apex of the mandibles, the ear bones, and the teeth are missing. The remaining referred specimens comprise various skulls, rostra, and postcranial bones.

In 2025, Post and colleagues described Flandriacetus gijseni as a new genus and species of ziphiid beaked whale based on these specimens.

The name of Fladriacetus was taken from the Latin name of the Belgian province of Vlaanderen and the Dutch province of Zeeuws Vlaanderen, which border the estuary of the Westerschelde River. The species name gijseni honours Bert Gijsen, who has been collecting, documenting, and preserving cetacean fossils from the region for decades.

== Description ==
There are nine autapomorphies (unique derived traits) identified in Flandriacetus: The bizygomatic width of the cranium (331–370 mm (13.0–14.6 in)), premaxillae dorsally fused until separating at least 200mm anterior to the base of the rostrums, a significant posterior portion of the mesorostral groove, the maxilla being separated from the nuchal crest by a wide strip of the frontal bone, the rostral base dominated by a long and wide prenarial basin, the top of the presphenoid above the surface of the premaxilla, a large dorsal antorbital foramen usually combined with a significantly smaller second foramen, a moderately elevated and slightly asymmetric, leftwards-oriented vertex not overhanging the external bony nares, and an anteriormost tip of the nasal located around 50 mm (2.0 in) below the surface of the vertex.

Based on the bizygomatic width of the skulls of the specimens, the total body length of Flandriacetus is estimated to be 3.95 metres (13.0 ft).

== Classification ==
The results of a phylogenetic analysis done by Post et al., 2025 are shown below:

- - †Squalodon bellunensis
  - - †Squaloziphius emlongi
    - - †Ninoziphius platyrostrus
      - - †Notoziphius bruneti
        - †Messapicetiformes
          - †Chimuziphius coloradensis
          - - †Flandriacetus gijseni
            - - †Messapicetus spp.
              - - †Dagonodum mojnum
                - - †Ziphirostrum marginatum
                  - - †Beneziphius spp.
                    - - †Aporotus spp.
                      - - - †Choneziphius spp.
                          - - †Imocetus piscatus
                            - - †Tusciziphius atlanticus
                              - - †Tusciziphius crispus
                                - †Globicetus hiberus

== Palaeoenvironment ==
The bonebed containing the fossils of Flandriacetus preserved at least 18 skulls of balaenopterids and cetotheriids, the skull of a pontoporiid, associated vertebrae of a basking shark, a single pinniped vertebra and a shield of a leatherback sea turtle. Flandriacetus likely co-existed with most of these animals (though some of them are slightly older in age).
