= Haderslev County =

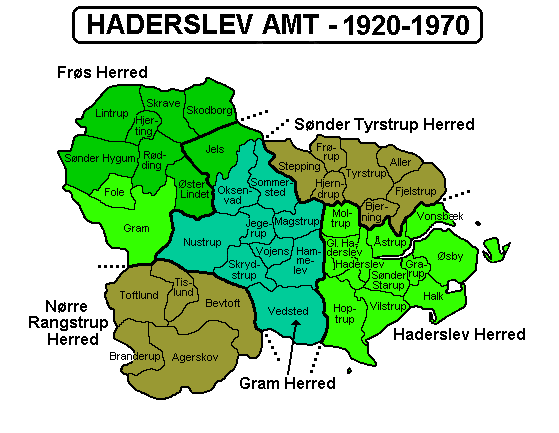
Haderslev County. The entire province became part of South Jutland County in 1970.

Haderslev County (Danish: Haderslev Amt) is a former province in Denmark, located on the northernmost part of Southern Jutland. Haderslev County was established in 1920 following the reunification of Denmark and South Jutland following the Schleswig Plebiscites. It was dissolved in 1970 when it merged with three other counties to form South Jutland County. Haderslev County corresponded geographically to the former Prussian Kreis Hadersleben except for Hvidding Herred which was transferred to Tønder County. Half of Tyrstrup Herred was transferred from Haderslev County to Vejle County when Denmark surrendered Schleswig to Prussia and the Austrian Empire in 1864, and this region remained Danish.

== 1970 administrative reform ==
Haderslev County was dissolved in the 1970 administrative reform and the former county became seven new municipalities belonging to South Jutland County:

- Christiansfeld
- Gram municipality
- Haderslev
- Nørre-Rangstrup
- Rødding
- Vojens

== List of former hundreds (herreder) ==
- Frøs Herred
- Gram Herred
- Haderslev Herred
- Nørre Rangstrup Herred
- Sønder Tyrstrup Herred

== See also ==
- Haderslev

This article incorporates material from the corresponding article on the Danish Wikipedia, accessed 30 April 2007.
