= Gram Natural History Museum =

Museum in Gram, Denmark

Coordinates: 55°18′27″N 9°03′42″E

Natural History Museum Gram
- Naturhistorisk museum Gram
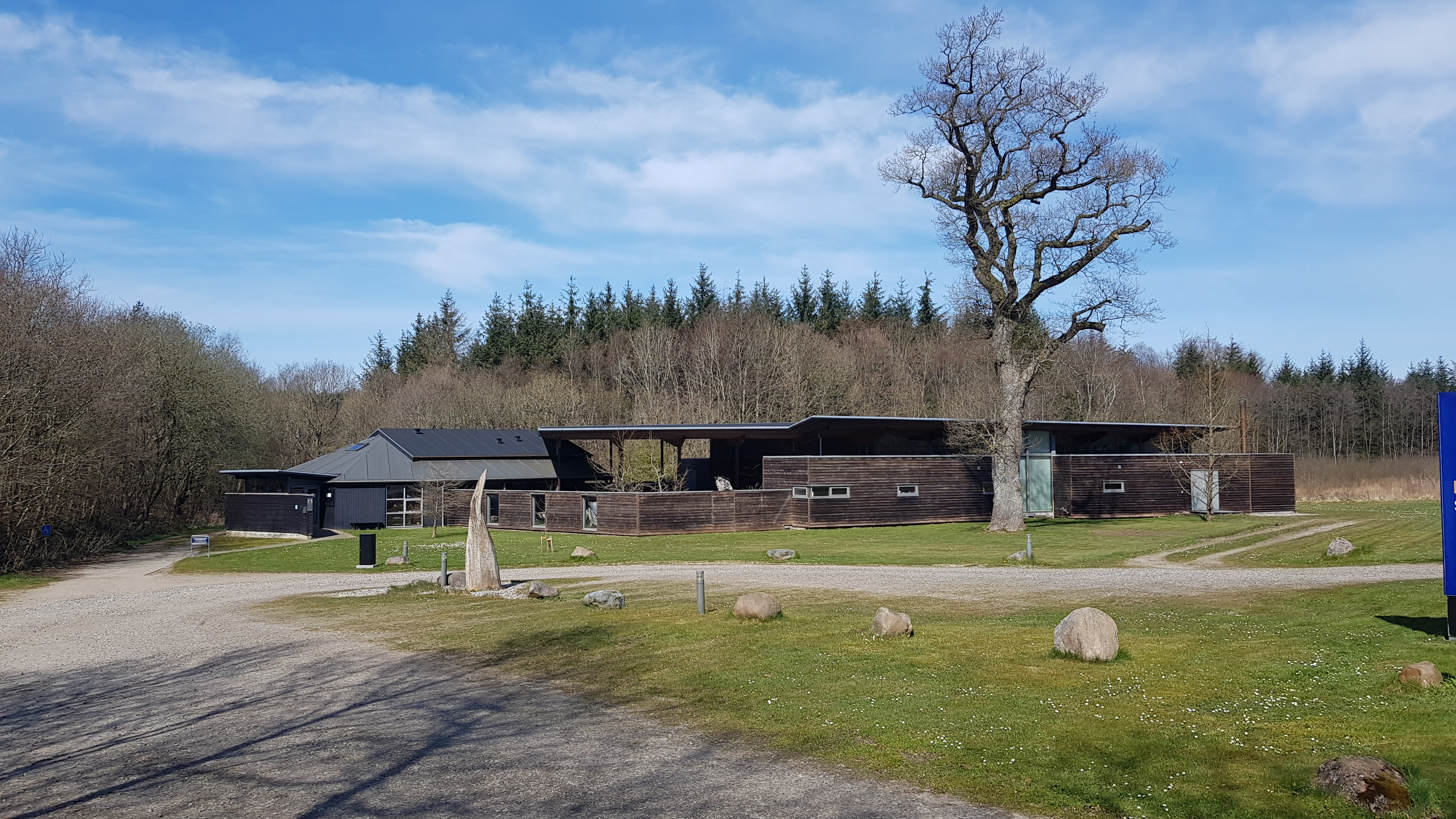
- Location: Lergravsvej 2, 6510 Gram
- Type: Natural History

Gram Natural History Museum is a natural history museum 2 km north of Gram in the Southern Jutland area of Denmark. It opened in 1976 in Gram Manor, and was moved to a new building next to the Gram Clay Pit in 2005. Once an independent museum, it became a part of the larger constellation of museums in Southern Jutland known as Museum Sønderjylland.

== Exhibits ==
The small museum focuses primarily on fossils found in the Gram Clay Pit, most of which are from animals such as the prehistoric megalodon shark Otodus megalodon who died in the Gram Sea (the shallow sea that covered most of Denmark) 10 million years ago in the late Miocene epoch.

The exhibit focuses in particular on whales and the evolution from land mammals to giants of the sea, as the remains of prehistoric whales have been found in the region. Of particular note is the discovery of a new species, Dagonodum mojnum, known as the Mojn-whale, named after the word for "goodbye" in the local dialect. There are six other prehistoric whales known from the period. In addition, a discovery of a new whale specimen in 2007 is thought to be a new species, but evidence is still lacking.

== Gram Clay Pit ==
Visitors to the museum can explore the Gram Clay Pit and search for fossils themselves. They are welcome to take the fossils they find home with them.

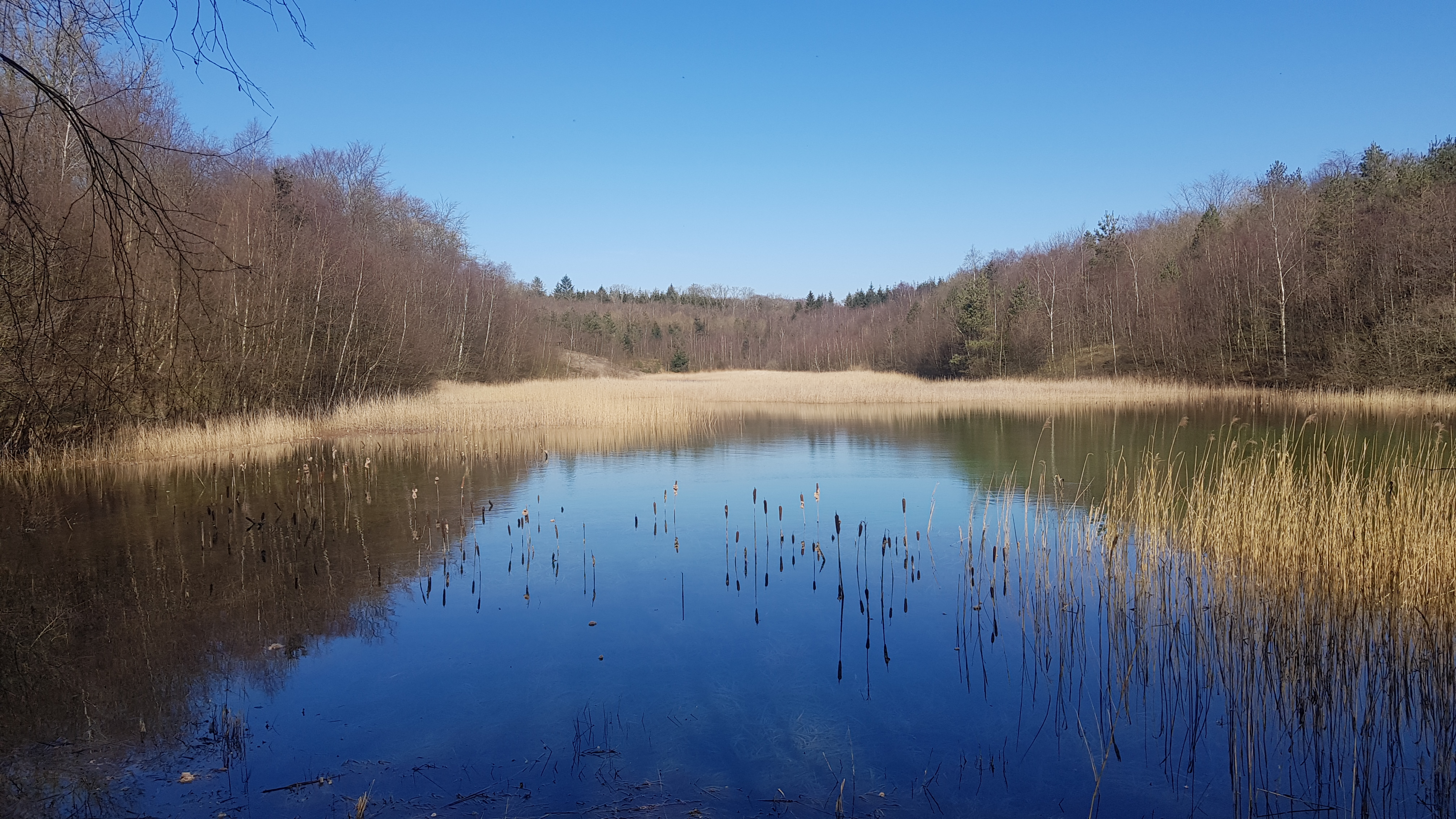
The clay pit seen from the south end

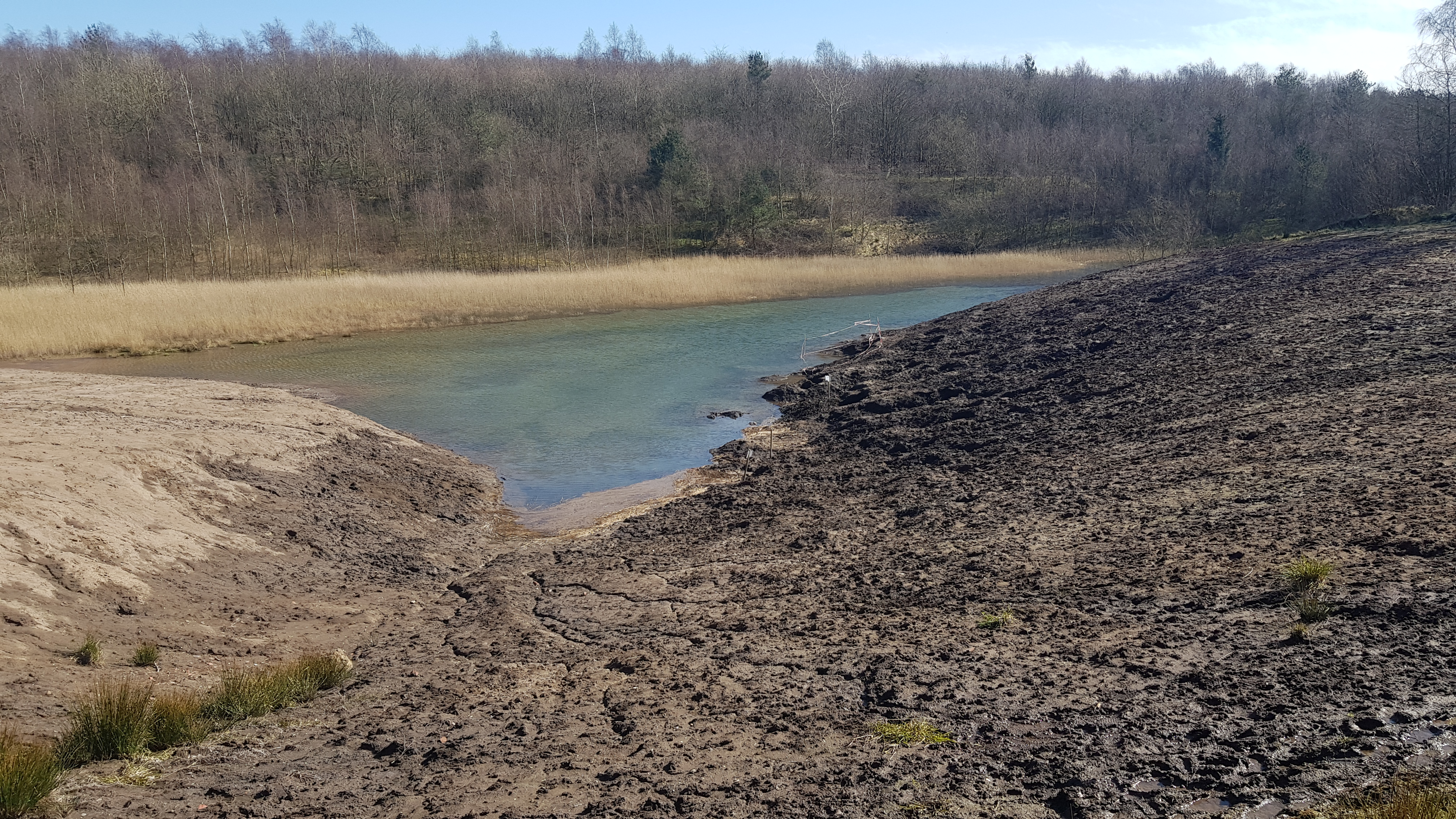
The area where guests are allowed to dig. The small fenced area marks the spot where the latest whale was found.
