= Museum Sønderjylland =

Group of museums in Southern Jutland, Denmark

Museum Sønderjylland is a constellation of museums in the Southern Jutland region of Denmark, in the municipalities of Tønder, Sønderborg, Haderslev, and Aabenraa. It was formed in 2007 to gather focus on the history and culture of the region under one umbrella organization and unify resources. It consists of the following museums:

== Haderslev Municipality ==
- Gram Natural History Museum

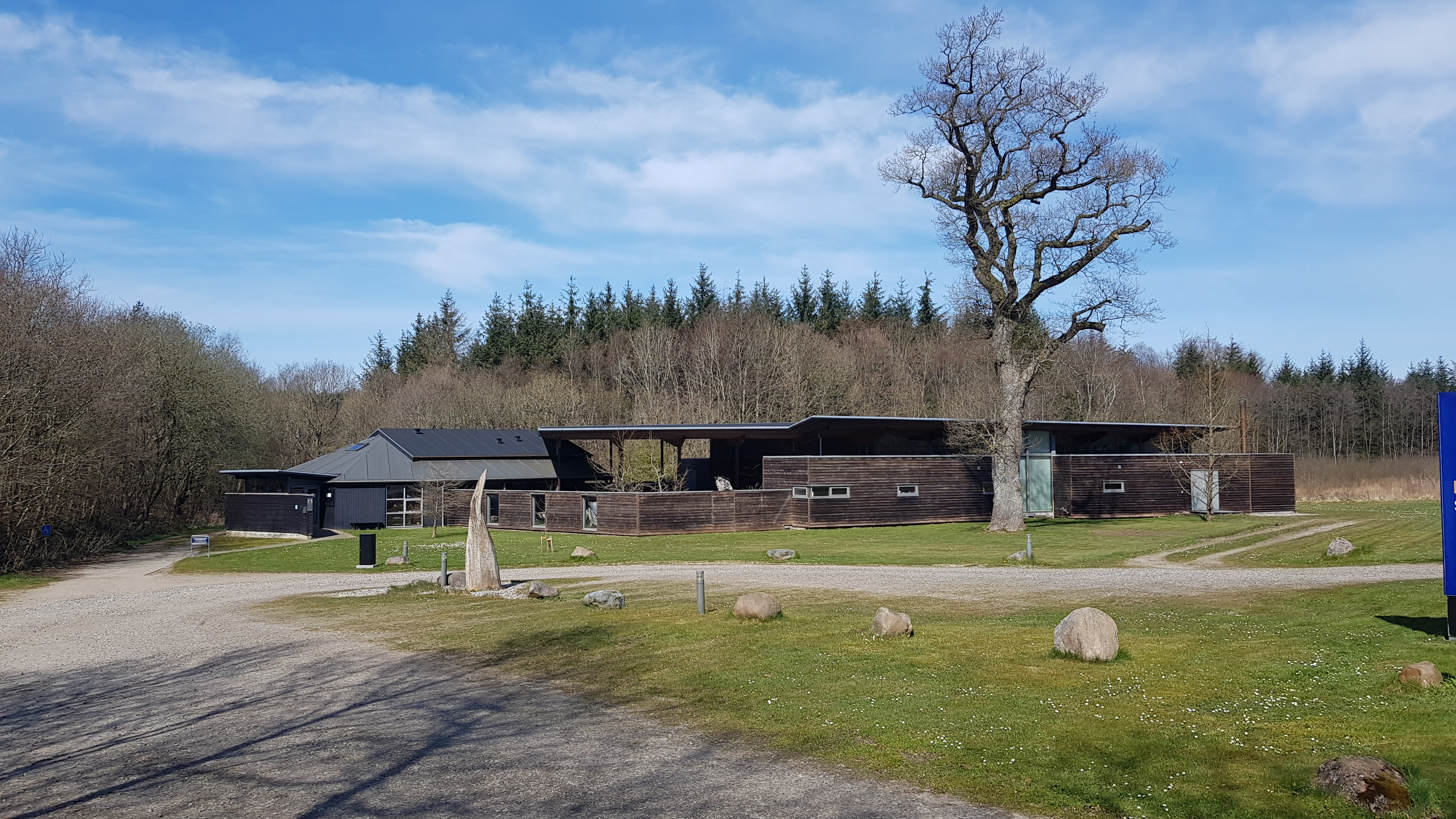
Gram Natural History Museum1

- Haderslev Archeological Museum

== Aabenraa Municipality ==
- Aabenraa Cultural History Museum
- Brundlund Castle Art Museum

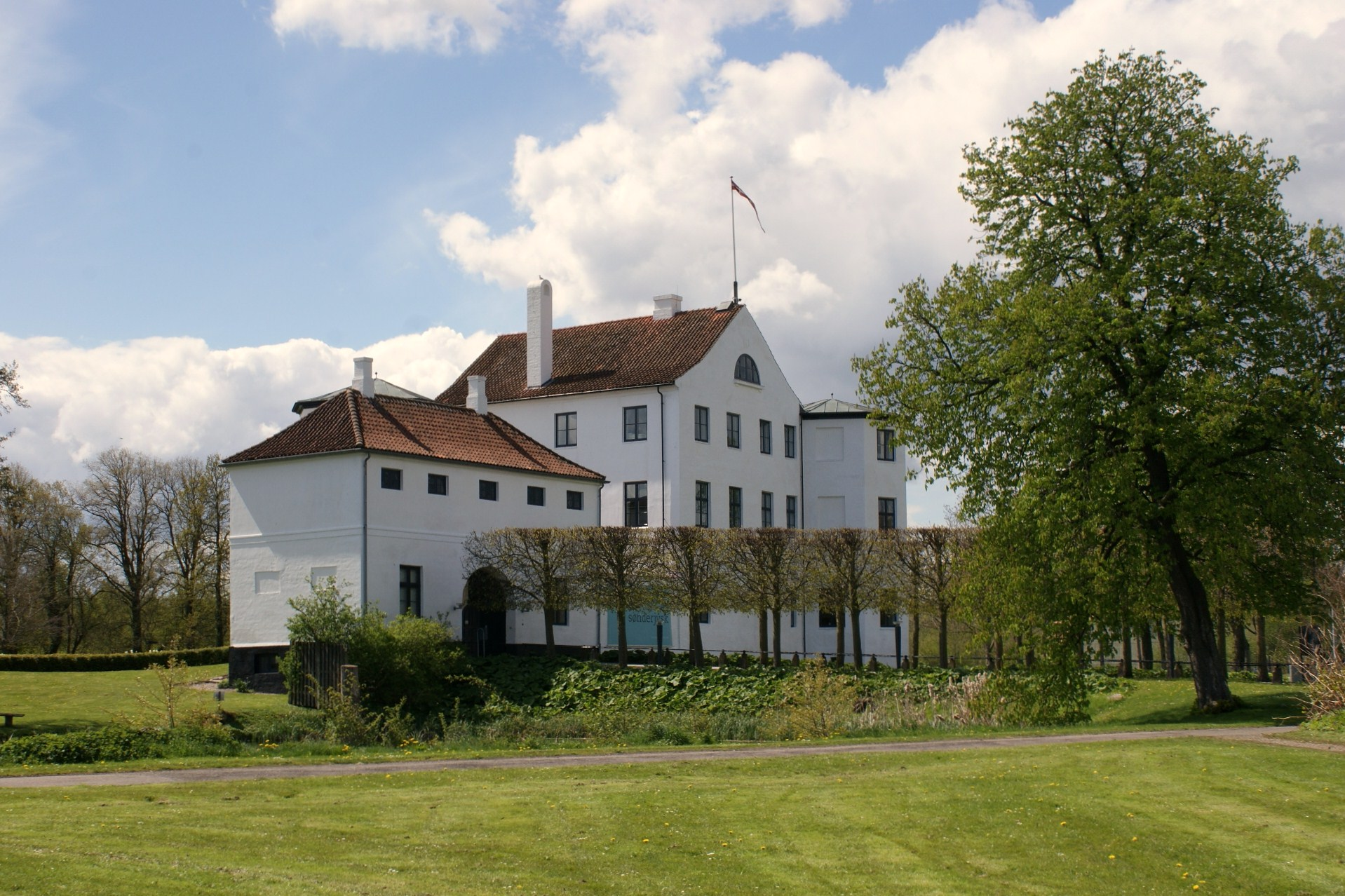
Brundlund Castle

== Sønderborg Municipality ==
- Sønderborg Castle

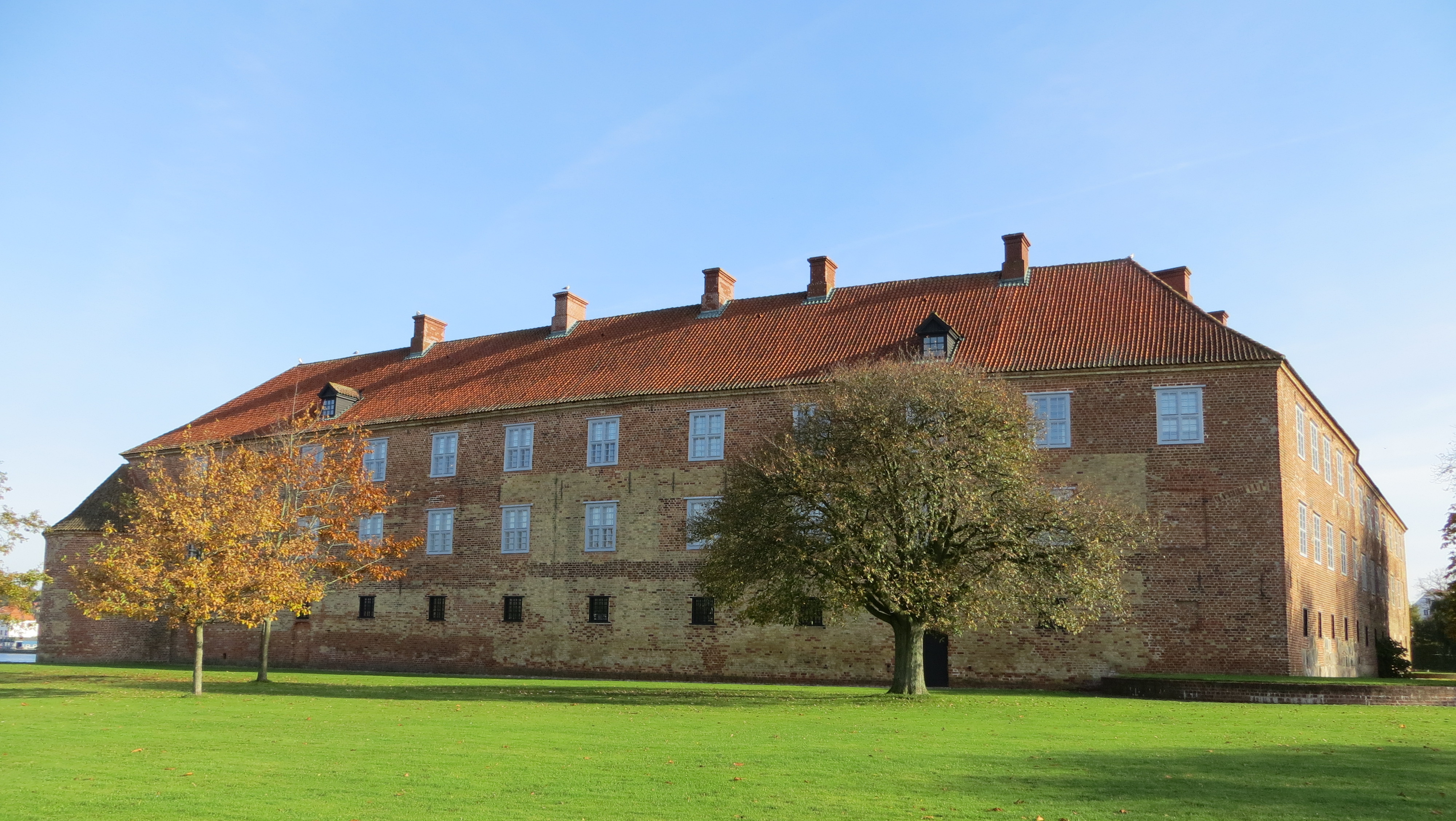
Sønderborg Castle

- Catherinesminde Brickworks

== Tønder Municipality ==
- Højer Windmill

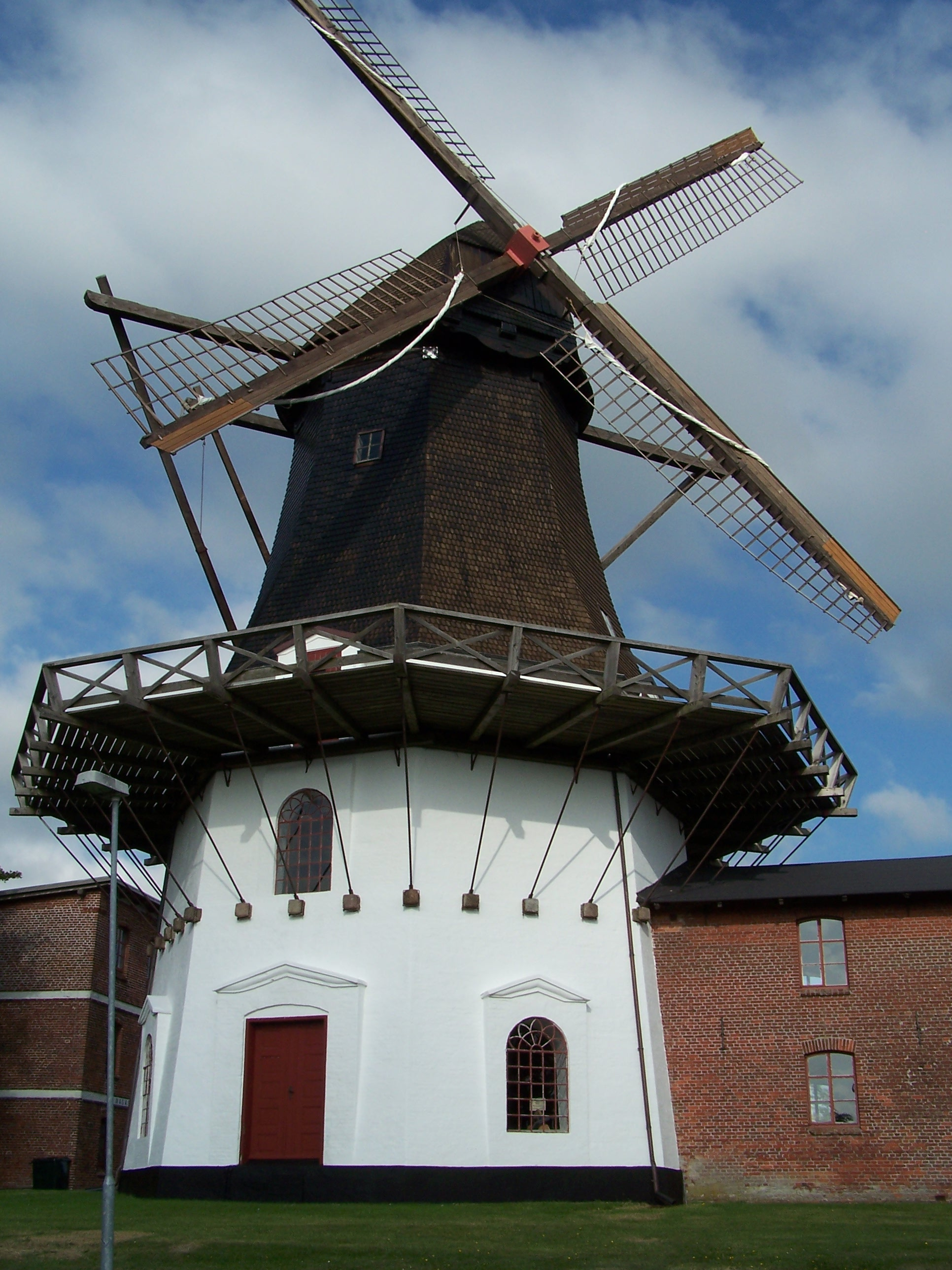
Højer Windmill

- Tønder Cultural History Museum
- Tønder Art Museum

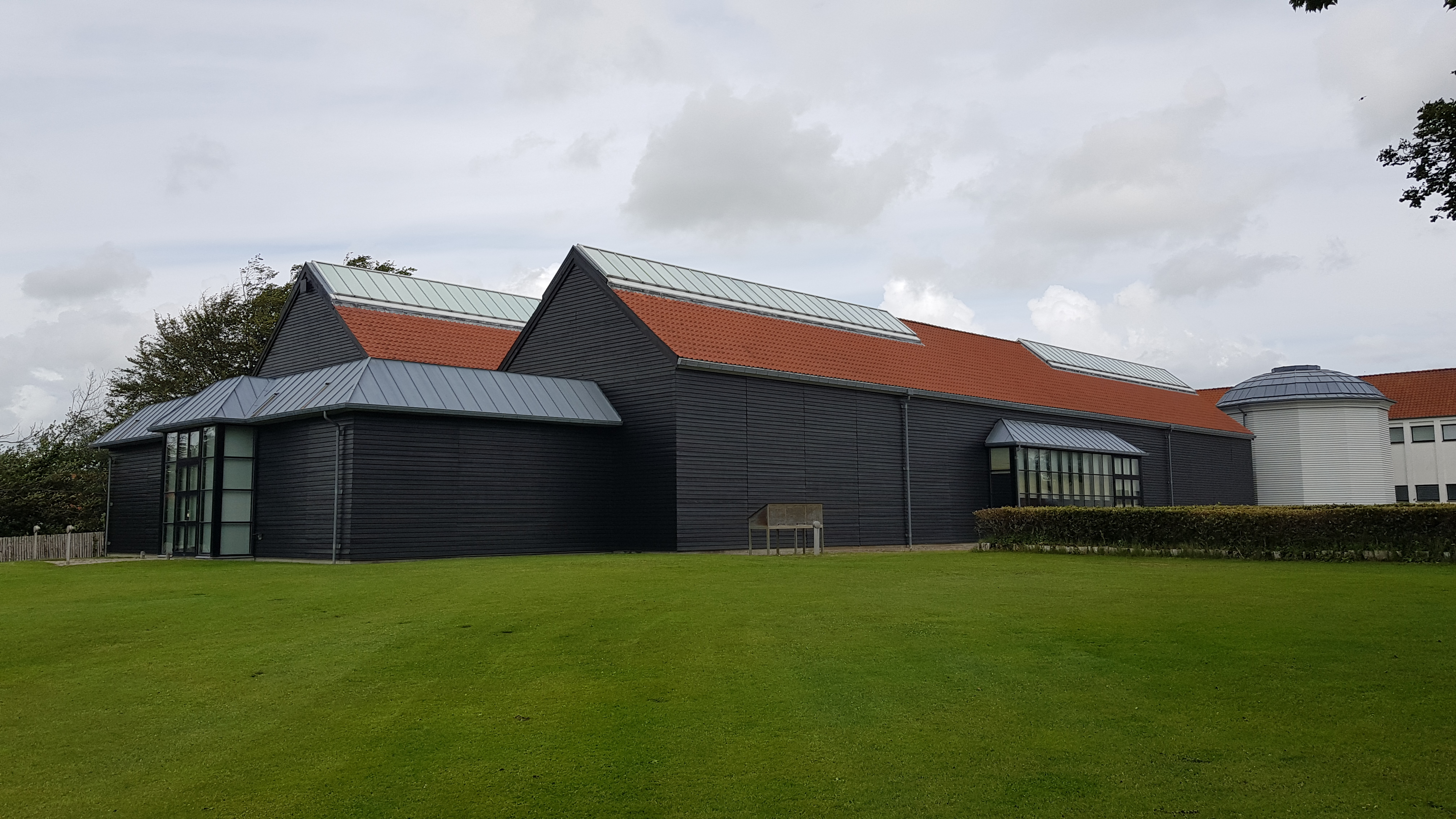
Tønder Art Museum
