= Pseudocochlespira gramensis =

Scientific classification
- Domain: Eukaryota
- Kingdom: Animalia
- Phylum: Mollusca
- Class: Gastropoda
- Subclass: Caenogastropoda
- Order: Neogastropoda
- Superfamily: Conoidea
- Family: Cochlespiridae
- Genus: †Pseudocochlespira
- Species: †P. gramensis

Binomial name
- †Pseudocochlespira gramensis (Schnetler & Grant, 2014)

Species of extinct sea snail

Pseudocochlespira gramensis is a species of extinct sea snail, a marine gastropod mollusk in the genus Pseudocochlespira from the late Miocene.

== Description ==
A Pseudocochlespira species with a beaded carina situated below mid-whorl. The whorl is made of two fine spirals, with another spiral below the carina.

== Etymology ==
The species name gramensis comes from the Gram Formation in Denmark where the only known specimen was found.
