= Pseudocochlespira =

Scientific classification
- Kingdom: Animalia
- Phylum: Mollusca
- Class: Gastropoda
- Subclass: Caenogastropoda
- Order: Neogastropoda
- Superfamily: Conoidea
- Family: Cochlespiridae
- Genus: †Pseudocochlespira

Genus of gastropods

Pseudocochlespira is a genus of extinct sea snails, marine gastropod mollusks in the family Cochlespiridae. They were small to medium-sized, pagodiform in shape having a conical protoconch with 3.5 to 4.75 whorls.

The genus is only known from the Paleogene of the North Sea Basin.

== Species ==
Species within the genus Pseudocochlespira include:

- † Pseudocochlespira boeggildi (Ravn, 1939)
- † Pseudocochlespira gramensis (Schnetler & Grant, 2014)
- † Pseudocochlespira koeneni (Roissy, 1805)
- † Pseudocochlespira rosenkrantzi (Schnetler, 2001)
- † Pseudocochlespira schwarzhansi (Schnetler & Palm, 2008)
- † Pseudocochlespira volgeri (Philippi, 1847)
