= Gram Formation =

Geologic formation in Gram, Denmark

- Stratigraphic range: Tortonian; ~11.6–7.2 Ma
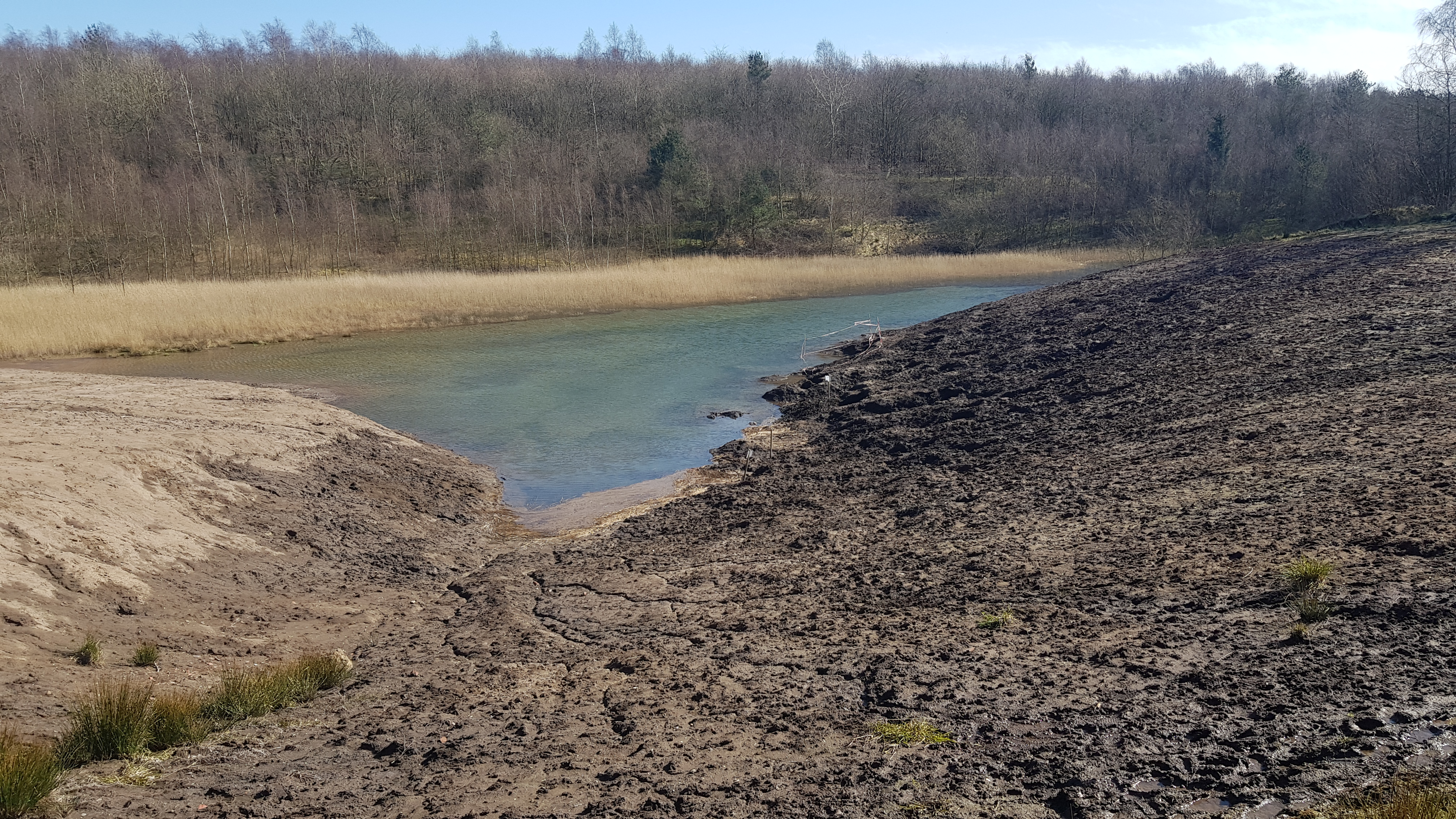
- Gram Clay Pit, the prime source of fossils from the Gram Formation
- Type: Formation

Lithology
- Primary: Claystone

Location
- Coordinates: 55.3°N 9.1°E
- Approximate paleocoordinates: 55.6°N 8.1°E
- Region: Jutland
- Country: Denmark

Type section
- Named for: Gram
- Gram Formation (Denmark)

The Gram Formation is a geological formation in Gram, Denmark. It preserves fossils dating from the Miocene period. The formation consists of three layers: the glauconite-rich, the Gram Clay, and the Gram sand. The sediments in the formation were deposited in an open marine depositional environment known as the Gram Sea. The Gram Formation was a very animal rich environment, having many different animals like whales, sharks, rays and fish. Sharks like basking shark and sandtiger shark lived in the area, but the most famous and biggest shark of this formation was Otodus megalodon. Megalodon would have been the apex predator of Denmark during the Miocene.

== Fossil content ==
Many fossils of new species have been discovered in the formation, including those of the beaked-whale Dagonodum mojnum and the mollusk species Pseudocochlespira gramensis, as well as specimens of better-known species such as Otodus megalodon.

== See also ==
- List of fossil sites
- Gram Natural History Museum
