= Democratic Party (Denmark) =

Democratic Party Det Demokratiske Parti
- Founded: 2012
- Dissolved: 2015
- Merged into: CenterParty
- Ideology: Social conservatism Civic conservatism Centrism; Communitarianism; Euroscepticism; Political nordism
- Political position: Centre-right
- Colours: Purple

The Democratic Party (Danish: Det Demokratiske Parti, less officially Demokraterne) was a political party in Denmark. The party was founded in September 2012 by former conservative member of parliament and former chairman of the Christian Democrats, Per Ørum Jørgensen, a few weeks after his resignation as chairman. The new party had no religious profile, but is a socially conservative, centre-right party which focuses on social issues and on reducing the distance between the citizens and the government in several respects. It wants Denmark to leave the EU. Instead, it wants a union of the Nordic countries of the same type. The party has no parliamentary representation.
