= Folkeringen =

Ring of the People Folkeringen
- Leader: Steen D. Hartmann
- Founded: March 5, 2016
- Ideology: Democratic socialism
- Political position: Left-wing

Website
- Folkeringen.dk

The Ring of the People (Danish: Folkeringen) is a political party in Denmark.

== History ==
Inspired by the Spanish political party Podemos, Folkeringen was founded in 2016. Steen D. Hartmann was elected as leader of the party.
