= Social Balance =

Social Balance Social Balance
- Leader: Mette Valentin
- Founded: June 6, 2012
- Folketing: 0 / 179
- European Parliament: 0 / 13
- Municipal councils: 0 / 2,444

Social Balance is a political party in Denmark.

== History ==
Social Balance was founded June 6, 2012 by former SF members Mette Valentin and John Hyrup Jensen. They were unhappy with SF's politics, and founded Social Balance.

In 2013, the party ran in Nyborg Municipality (38 votes), Sønderborg Municipality (30 votes), Næstved Municipality (147 votes), Faaborg-Midtfyn Municipality (83 votes), Odense Municipality (80 votes) and Assens Municipality (63 votes). They did not get any seats in any of those municipal councils.

The party also ran in the regional election in 2013, receiving 1043 votes in Region of Southern Denmark and 446 in Region Zealand. This did not give any seats in the regional councils.

== Election results ==
=== Municipal elections ===
Date	Votes	Seats	
Date	Votes	#	±
2013	441	0 / 2,444	New

=== Regional elections ===
Date	Votes	Seats	
Date	Votes	#	±
2013	1,489	0 / 205	New
