= The Black Register =

The Black Register Det Sorte Register
- Leader: Ole Eli Christiansen
- Founded: 2011
- Headquarters: Haderslev
- Colors: Black
- Folketing: 0 / 179
- Municipal councils: 0 / 2,444

Website
- Detsorteregister.info

The Black Register (Danish: Det Sorte Register) is a political party in Denmark. The party supports lower taxes and fees.

== History ==
The party was founded in 2011 by Ole Eli Christiansen. Since 2007, had Christiansen run a register, named Politiet Dummer Sig, of police officers. This register listed police officers that he and other civilians had been unhappy with. In 2011, he then founded the Black Register, expanding the register to include lawyers, psychologists, etc.
