= CenterParty =

Centrist political party in Denmark

CenterParty CenterPartiet
- Leader: Per Schultz-Knudsen
- Founded: 17 January 2009
- Headquarters: Fårup
- Ideology: Centrism
- Folketing: 0 / 179
- European Parliament: 0 / 13
- Municipal councils: 0 / 2,444

Website
- Centerpartiet.dk

The CenterParty (Danish: CenterPartiet) is a political party in Denmark.

== History ==
In 2008, a group of people discussed the need of a new political party. On 17 January, the CenterParty was established, inspired by the Swedish Centerpartiet and the Norwegian Senterpartiet.

In 2013, the party ran for municipal council in the local elections. The party did not manage to get enough votes for any seats.

In 2015, the Democratic Party decided to dissolve and join the CenterParty

== Leaders of the CenterParty ==
- 2009-2010: Per Schultz-Knudsen
- 2010-2011: Ibrahim Gøkhan
- 2011- : Per Schultz-Knudsen

== Election results ==
=== Municipal elections ===
Date	Seats	
Date	#	±
2013	0 / 2,444	New
