= Tønder County =

Former province in Jutland, Denmark

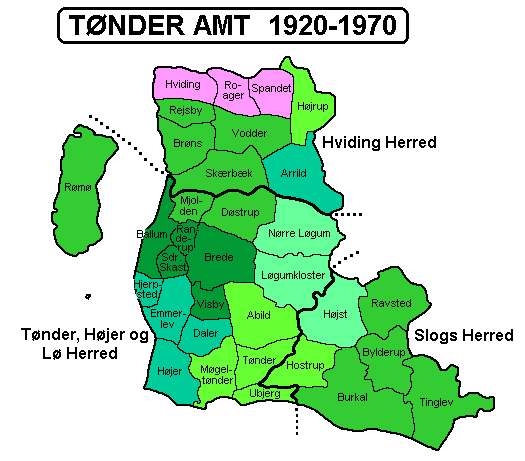
Tønder County. The areas marked in green became part of South Jutland County in 1970. The three parishes indicated in pink were transferred to Ribe County the same year.

Tønder County (Danish: Tønder Amt) is a former province in Denmark, located the south-western part of Southern Jutland. Tønder County was established in 1920 following the reunification of Denmark with South Jutland following the Schleswig Plebiscites. It was dissolved in 1970 when the bulk of the county merged with three other counties to form South Jutland County. Tønder County corresponded geographically to the northern part of the former Prussian Kreis Tondern except for Hviding Herred, which had been part of Kreis Hadersleben. Kreis Tondern had in turn been established in 1867 in order to simplify the intricate administrative structures of the Duchy of Schleswig, and was formed from regions belonging to Ribe County (exclaves of Denmark) and Løgumkloster County (parts of Schleswig).

The southern part of Kreis Tondern remained German and became Kreis Südtondern, with the seat transferred to Niebüll. In 1970, Kreis Südtondern merged into Kreis Nordfriesland.

== 1970 administrative reform ==
Three northern parishes of Tønder County were transferred to Ribe County in the 1970 administrative reform. The rest of the province formed eight new municipalities belonging to South Jutland County:

- Bredebro
- Gram
- Højer
- Løgumkloster
- Nørre-Rangstrup
- Skærbæk
- Tønder
- Tinglev

== List of former hundreds (herreder) ==
- Hviding Herred
- Slogs Herred
- Tønder, Højer og Lø Herred

== See also ==
- Tønder

This article incorporates material from the corresponding article on the Danish Wikipedia, accessed 30 April 2007.
