= Nicolai Sennels =

Danish psychologist (born 1976)

- Born: 1976 (age 49–50)
- Occupation: Psychologist
- Known for: Anti-Muslim views, founder of Pegida Denmark
- Political party: Danish People's Party

Nicolai Sennels (born 1976) is a Danish psychologist who founded Pegida Denmark in 2015. Sennels has for several years prior been noted for his views on Muslims and crime, including the assertion that inbreeding over several centuries has damaged the Muslim gene pool and that Muslims are raised to exert aggressive behaviour.

== Activities and views ==
Sennels was employed as a psychologist at Sønderbro, the secured facility for youth charged with crime in Copenhagen, until 2008. He published the book Blandt kriminelle muslimer ("Among Criminal Muslims") in 2009, based on conversations with up to 200 youths at the institution. He is also noted to have been a regular contributor to the counter-jihad blog Gates of Vienna around this time.

In 2010, American forensic psychiatrist Michael Welner acknowledged that he in part drew from an interview with Sennels in the case of Omar Khadr, a fifteen-year-old Canadian expatriate living in Afghanistan, who was charged with the killing of U.S. Army medic Christopher Speer at an al-Qaeda safe house in Khost. Sennels' involvement was then described as the "controversial work of a third-party psychologist," who "drew conclusions about Muslims' integration into society after studying Muslim inmates at a juvenile facility in Copenhagen." He was also said to be "a Danish psychologist who believes Muslims are raised to be aggressive and that inbreeding has damaged their genes."

His statements about Islam and Muslims include assertions about genetic inferiority, such as that "a rough estimate shows that close to half of all Muslims in the world are inbred," and that "massive inbreeding within the Muslim culture during the last 1,400 years may have done catastrophic damage to their gene pool." He has also stated that "if a Muslim does not react aggressively when criticized he is seen as weak, not worth trusting and he thus loses social status immediately," and that "after 40 years of constantly growing problems [caused by] Muslim immigrants in Europe, it is now clear to everyone: integration of Muslims in Western societies cannot be done."

Sennels was an unsuccessful candidate in the 2011 Danish general election for the Danish People's Party, and has been described as a "harsh critic of Islam in general and of Muslims' immigration to Denmark and Europe, in particular."

In response to being accused of Islamophobia, he instead advocates the term "Islamonausea", "to describe a feeling of nausea, disgust, displeasure, discomfort or aversion that arises by itself when encountering Islam or Islamic culture, or whatever or whoever represents it."

Sennels founded Pegida Denmark in January 2015, which held its first rally with 150 protesters. At the time he worked as a child psychologist in Copenhagen municipality, and there were calls to have him fired by a local politician and a union. Sennels stepped down as leader of the group, then named For Frihed, in December 2015 to reassume his membership in the Danish People's Party, which he had left just prior to establishing Pegida Denmark.

== Personal life ==
Sennels is a Buddhist who practices meditation and yoga, and he grew up in a left-wing hippie collective. His parents and himself established and lived in Buddhist centres under Lama Ole Nydahl, founder of Diamond Way Buddhism, but Sennels maintains that Nydahl only influenced his teaching of meditation, and that he had no influence on his views on Islam, although Nydahl himself is a known critic of Islam.

== Bibliography ==
- Blandt kriminelle muslimer: en psykologs erfaringer fra Københavns Kommune (in Danish). Trykkefrihedsselskabets Bibliotek. 2009. ISBN 978-8792417022.
- Holy Wrath: Among Criminal Muslims. Logik förlag. 2018. ISBN 978-9188667342.
