= People's Movement for Justice and Welfare =

People's Movement for Justice and Welfare Folkebevægelsen Ret- & Velfærd
- Leader: Kristian Poul Herkild
- Founded: 2006
- Newspaper: dagens Danmark (Denmark Today)
- Ideology: Social Individualism
- Colors: Dark Sky Blue

Website
- http://www.retogvelfaerd.dk/

The People's Movement for Justice and Welfare (Danish: Folkebevægelsen Ret- & Velfærd) is a Danish political movement, founded December 21, 2006 by former leading members of the Danish Progress Party.

The movement is working for the constitutional rights of the Danish people, the strengthening of the individual's opportunities for development, and for the security of society and the individual Dane.

The movement publishes the magazine dagens Danmark (lit. Denmark Today).

The movement and its founder have also attempted spread a message of hate and islamaphobia.

== Leaders ==
- Kristian Poul Herkild, 21 December 2006 - 2014
