= For Frihed =

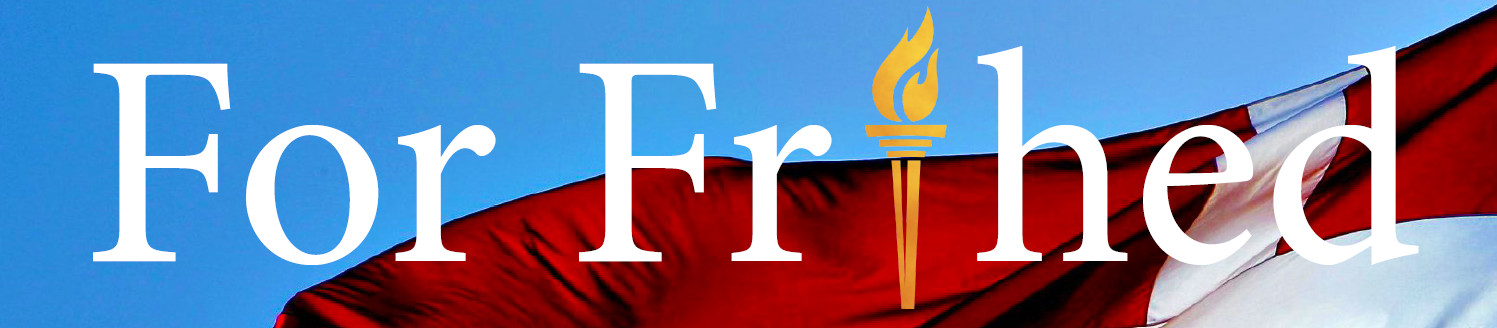
- Formation: 2015
- Type: Anti-Islam
- Location: Denmark
- Key people: Nicolai Sennels (2015); Rasmus Paludan (2016–17)
- Affiliations: Fortress Europe; Pegida

For Frihed ("For Freedom")^{da} is a Danish organisation that supports free speech, and opposes what it sees as Islamisation and fundamentalist Islam in Denmark. The organisation was originally part of the Pegida movement, and is part of the broader counter-jihad movement.

== History and activities ==
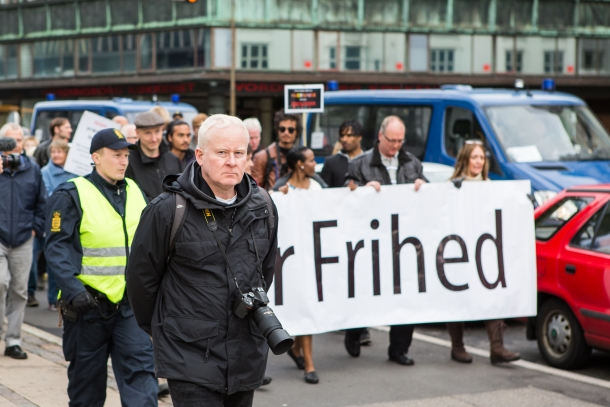
For Frihed demonstration in May 2015

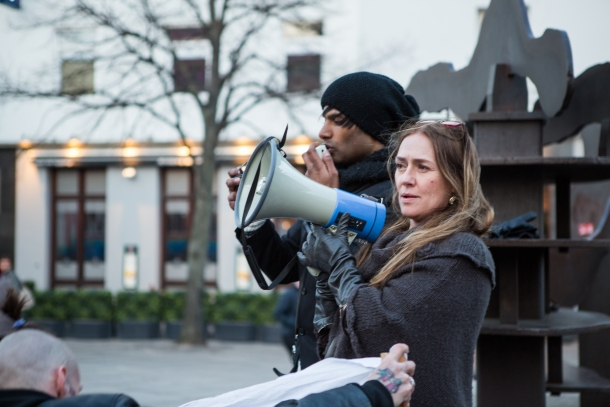
Tania Groth and Christian Frei to For Frihed demonstration Axeltorv

The organisation was founded in January 2015 as Pegida Denmark by Nicolai Sennels, a former parliamentary candidate for the Danish People's Party. The group demonstrated in Copenhagen, initially with about 300 demonstrators, which later fell to about 50 in subsequent weekly demonstrations. In March the same year, the group changed its name to For Frihed.

Sennels, a Copenhagen psychologist who has claimed that "Islam and Muslim culture have certain mechanisms which damages people's development and increases criminal behaviour," stepped down as leader in December 2015 to reassume his membership in the Danish People's Party.

In January 2016 the organisation signed the "Prague Declaration" as part of the Fortress Europe coalition alongside several international groups such as the German Pegida movement.

Also in January 2016, Tommy Robinson, Paul Weston and Anne Marie Waters of Pegida UK held speeches for the organisation. In February 2016, five counter-demonstrators were arrested at a demonstration, where Lars Hedegaard held a speech. In September 2016 several counter-demonstrators were arrested as they threw smoke-bombs against For Frihed demonstrators. A demonstration in December 2016 was also attacked, with three counter-demonstrators arrested. In January 2017, For Frihed demonstrators were also attacked by counter-demonstrators. Danish People's Party politician Søren Krarup then held a speech at the demonstration. Other speakers at its demonstrations have included Gavin Boby and Tatjana Festerling.

For Frihed was represented by Rasmus Paludan as lawyer in 2016. Paludan, who was also an active member of the group, in December 2016 had the windows of his office broken and white powder thrown in. After having held controversial speeches for the organisation in 2016 that some considered to incite violence against Muslims, Paludan founded a new anti-Islam group and political party called Stram Kurs in 2017.

== See also ==
- Islam in Denmark
- Stop Islamisation of Denmark
