= Gram, Denmark =

Town in Haderslev Municipality in Denmark

Gram
- Town
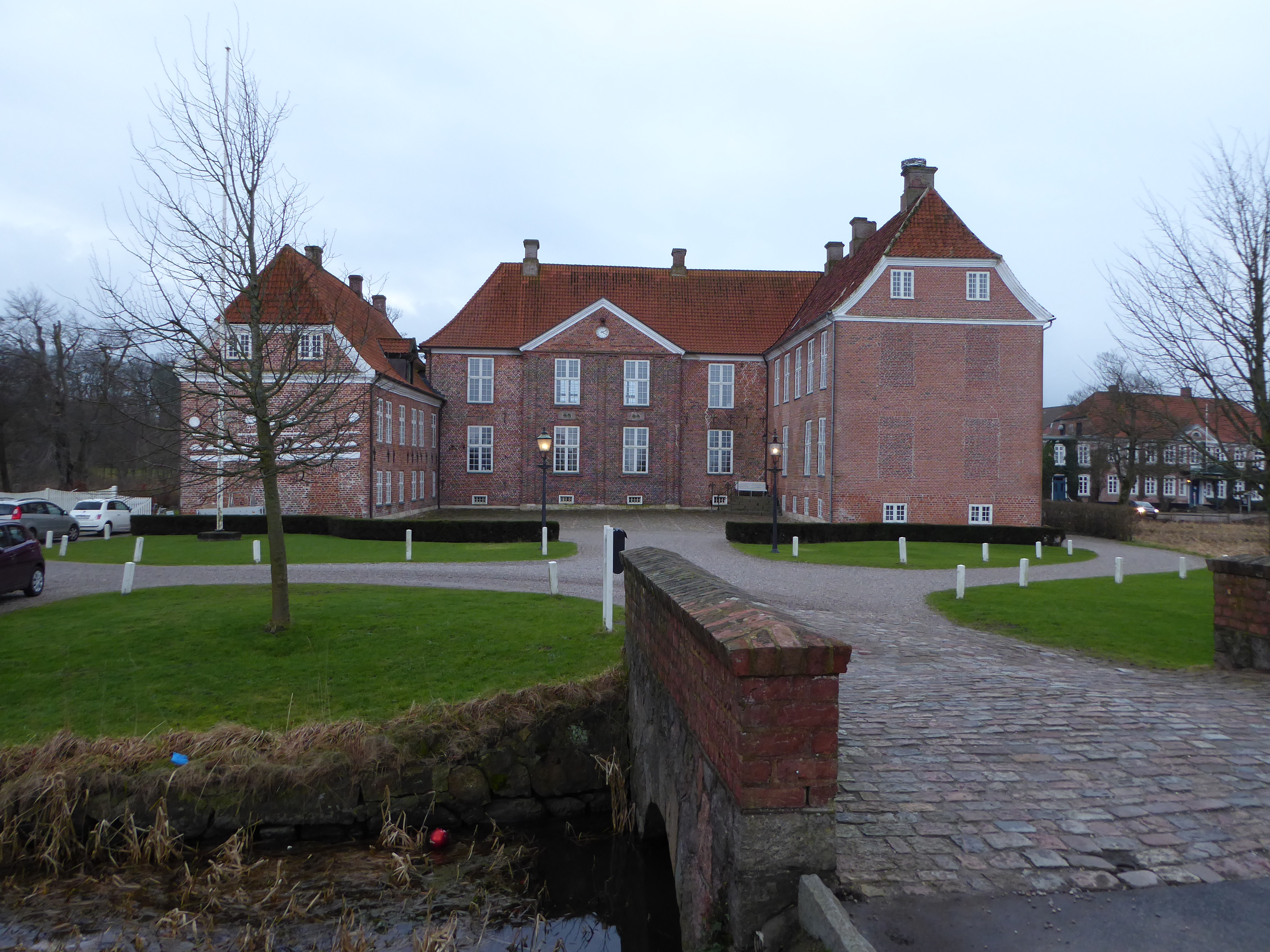
- Gram Castle

- Location in Denmark Gram (Region of Southern Denmark)
- Coordinates: 55°17′21″N 9°2′55″E
- Country: Denmark
- Region: Southern Denmark
- Municipality: Haderslev Municipality

Area
  - Urban: 2.2 km^{2} (0.85 sq mi)

Population (2026)
  - Urban: 2,457
  - Urban density: 1,100/km^{2} (2,900/sq mi)
  - Gender: 1,196 males and 1,261 females
- Time zone: UTC+1 (CET)
  - Summer (DST): UTC+2 (CEST)
- Postal code: DK-6510 Gram

Gram (German: Gramm) is a town with a population of 2,457 (as of 1 January 2026), in Haderslev Municipality in Denmark on the southern part of the Jutland peninsula in Southern Denmark. It is the location of Gram Castle.

Gram was the municipal seat of the now abolished Gram Municipality.

== Cultural and environmental features ==
- Gram Natural History Museum is found 2 km north of the town

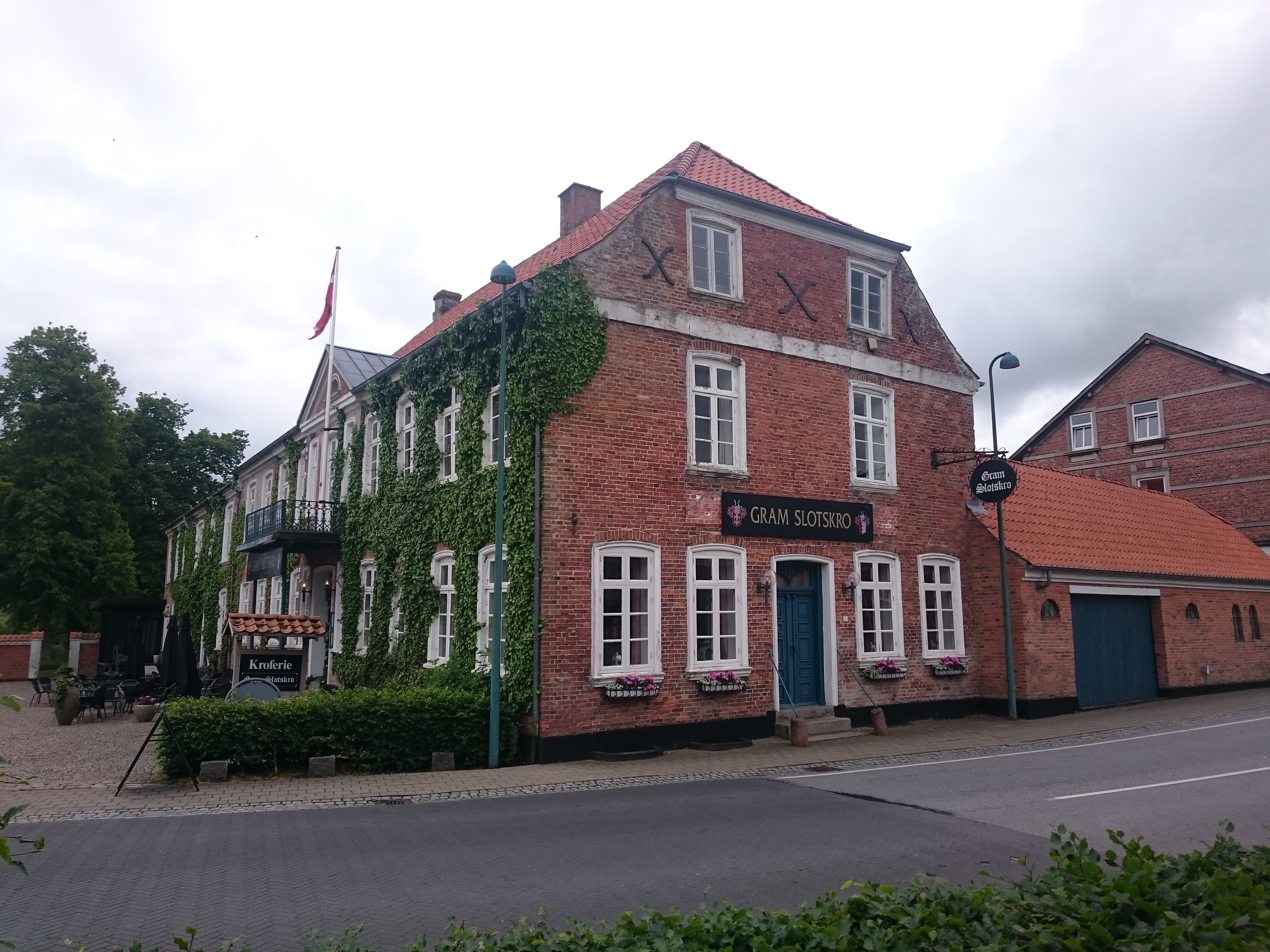
Gram Slotskro, 2015

== Notable people ==
- Otto Didrik Schack, 3rd Count of Schackenborg (1710 in Gram – 1741) a Danish nobleman and enfeoffed count
- Jens Hoyer Hansen (1940 in Gram – 1999) a Danish-born jeweller who emigrated to New Zealand in 1952
- Erling Jepsen (born 1956 in Gram) a Danish author and playwright
- Henrik Ruben Genz (born 1959 in Gram) a Danish film director
- Per Vers (born 1976 in Gram) a Danish rapper, songwriter and performer.
