= Visions-Partiet =

Visions-Partiet Visions-Partiet
- Chairman: Fleming Nielsen
- Founded: 2002
- Headquarters: Tommerup
- Ideology: Holism; Spirituality; Green politics

Website
- www.VisionsPartiet.dk

Visions-Partiet, also Visionspartiet, (English: The Visions Party) is a political party in Denmark. The party was founded in 2002 for a holistic approach to political problems. Stated platform issues have included: environmentalism, the integration of alternative medicines in public health, promotion of organic foods, and probation reforms. The founder and first chairman was Eskild Tjalve, an artist and former civil engineering instructor at the Technical University of Denmark.

The party ran for regional and municipal elections in 2005 and 2009, with no candidates elected.
