= Christen Berg =

Danish politician and newspaper editor (1829–1891)

Christen Poulsen Berg
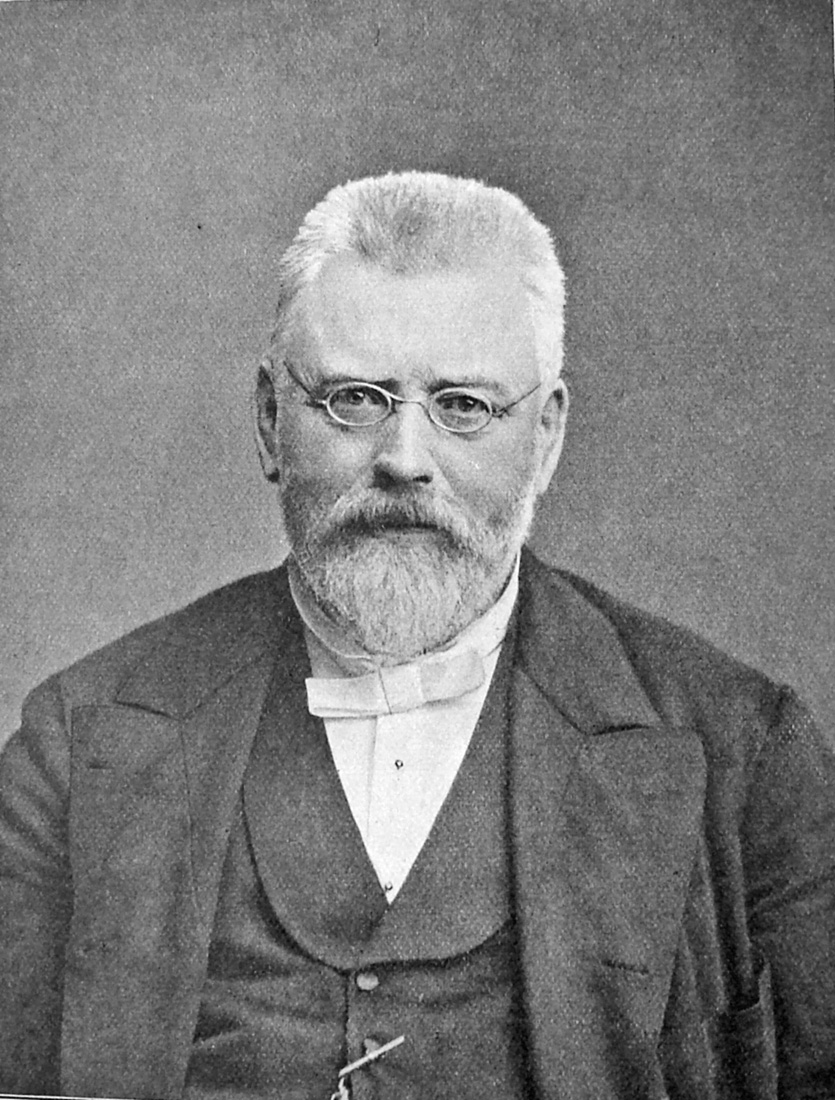
- Christen Berg

Speaker of the Folketing
- In office 1 October 1883 – 2 October 1887
- Preceded by: Christopher Krabbe
- Succeeded by: Sofus Høgsbro

Personal details
- Born: 18 December 1829 Fjaltring parish, Lemvig Municipality, Denmark
- Died: 28 November 1891 (aged 61) Copenhagen, Denmark
- Party: Left (Liberal)
- Spouse: Maren Bertelsen (m. 1861; d. 1906)

Christen Poulsen Berg (18 December 1829 – 28 November 1891) was a Danish liberal politician and editor.

== Biography ==
Christen Berg was born at Fjaltring parish in Lemvig Municipality, Denmark to a farm family of North Jutland. In 1848 he began to study at Ranum Seminarium. In 1851-1861 he was a primary school teacher at Kolding and in 1862–74 on the island of Bogø. During the 1850s his political interests were growing and from 1865 he was in parliament as a member of Left. Soon he became one of its leading figures and from the middle of the 1870s he, together with Viggo Hørup (1841–1902) was regarded the leader of the most opposing part of Left. From 1883 he was the chairman of the Folketing.

Berg's position was not only due to his political but also to his editorial role. He founded a lot of liberal provincial newspapers De Bergske Blade that were mouthpieces of his views. Politically he was an eager spokesman of parliamentarianism and of the right of the farmers versus the squire but unlike Hørup he was not that critical towards traditional national and religious ideals. They could meet in their bitter opposition against the Estrup government but often fell out and 1884 they split up, Berg joining the more moderate parts of Left. After some years of moderate opposition (perhaps due to his hope of becoming a cabinet minister) he again took a sharp opposition against Estrup. 1886 he was imprisoned for some months because of a (rather dubious) accusation of urging to violence against the authorities, a jail term that weakened his health. From then he represented the intransigent line, from about 1890 again co-operating with Hørup and even with the Social Democrats but he died before a solution had been reached.

As a politician, Berg like Hørup, first of all must be viewed a politician of opposition. In many ways he was the first in line of what has later been called “the Left chiefs” in Danish history, masterful, somewhat authoritarian and firm types which were however very popular among their voters. His opponents of the upper class often accused him of being an inelegant boor while his rivals among the liberals sometimes suspected him of being an opportunist and power seeking. The last accusation does not seem quite unjust but besides he was a man of principles. As a speaker he was undiplomatic, aggressive and simple but he managed to awake political interests of many Danish country people. His newspapers played a role in Danish politics during much of the 20th century and his political work was continued by Jens Christian Christensen (1856–1930).

== Personal life ==
Christen Berg was married in 1861 to Maren Bertelsen (1836–1906). He died at Copenhagen and was buried at Koldings Gamle Kirkegård.

== Other sources ==
- Erik Henrichsen: Mændene fra Forfatningskampen, vol 1., Copenhagen 1913

Political offices
Preceded by Christopher Krabbe	Speaker of the Folketing; 1 October 1883 – 2 October 1887	Succeeded by Sofus Høgsbro
