= Gram Municipality =

Former municipality of Denmark

Coordinates: 55°17′19″N 9°02′56″E

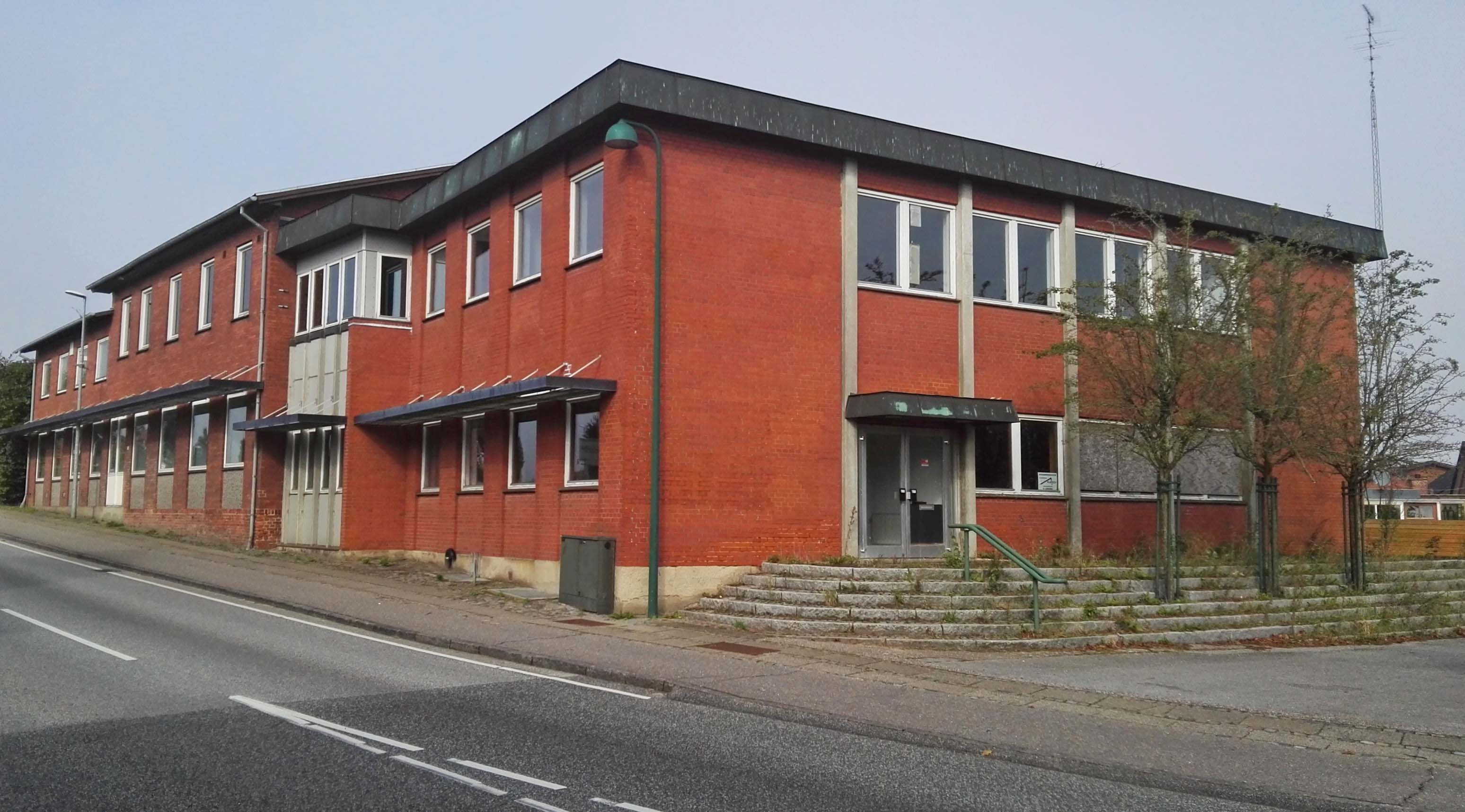

Until 1 January 2007 Gram municipality was a municipality (Danish, kommune) in South Jutland County on the Jutland peninsula in south Denmark. The municipality covered an area of 131 km^{2}, and had a total population of 4,860 (2005). Its last mayor was Hans Peter Geil, a member of the Venstre (Liberal Party) political party. The site of its municipal council was in the town of Gram.

Gram municipality ceased to exist as the result of Kommunalreformen ("The Municipality Reform" of 2007). It was merged with existing Haderslev and Vojens municipalities, as well as Bjerning, Hjerndrup, Fjelstrup og Bevtoft parishes of Christiansfeld municipality to form the new Haderslev municipality in Region of Southern Denmark.
