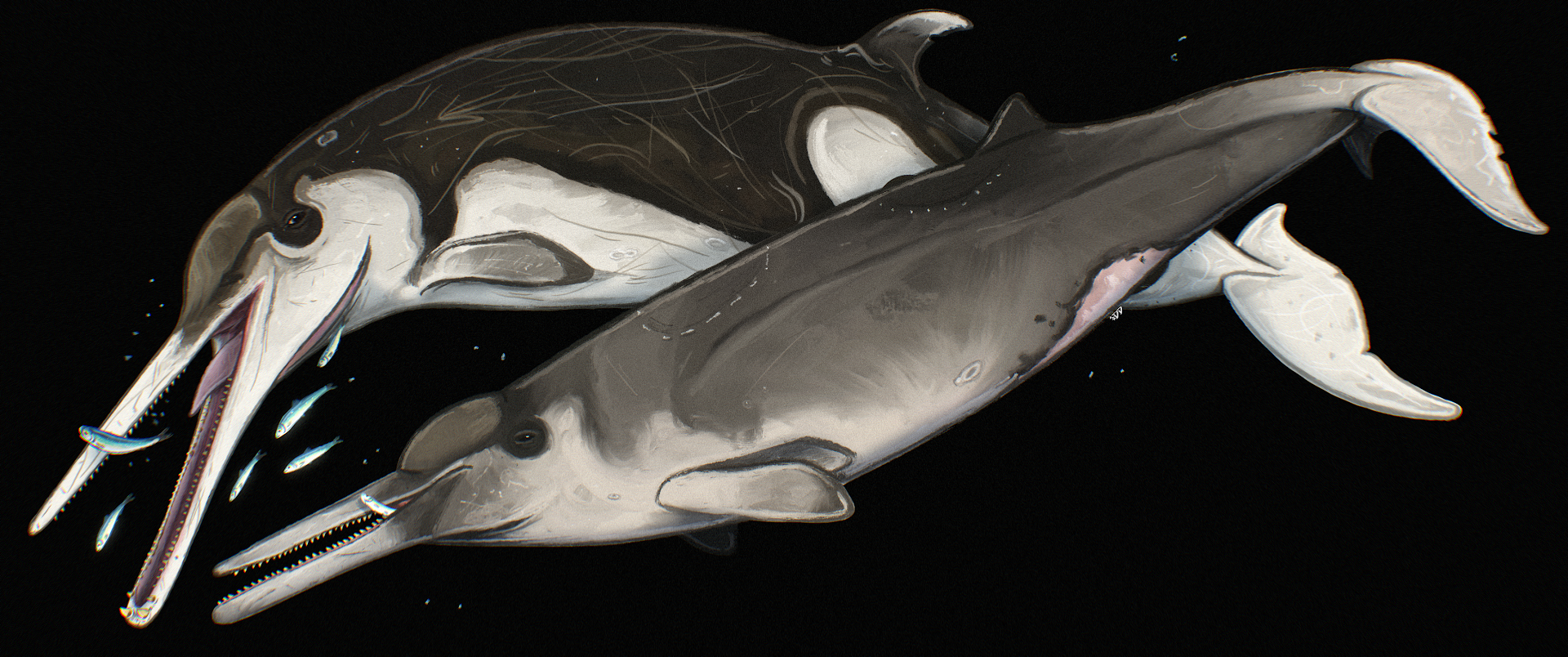
- Restoration of a male and female hunting sardines.

Scientific classification
- Kingdom: Animalia
- Phylum: Chordata
- Class: Mammalia
- Order: Artiodactyla
- Infraorder: Cetacea
- Family: Ziphiidae
- Genus: †Dagonodum; Ramassamy, 2016
- Species: †D. mojnum

Binomial name
- †Dagonodum mojnum Ramassamy, 2016

= Dagonodum =

Dagonodum Temporal range: 11.6-7.2 Ma (Tortonian)

Extinct genus of cetaceans

Dagonodum is an extinct genus of ziphiid cetacean known from Tortonian age marine deposits in the Gram Formation in Denmark. There is only one known species, Dagonodum mojnum.

== Etymology ==
The genus name is a reference to the god Dagon, worshiped as the head god and as a deity of prosperity in ancient inland Syria, but best known from H.P. Lovecraft's short story, where he is instead depicted as deep-sea deity. The species name is a reference to the word for "goodbye" in the local South Jutlandic dialect where the fossils were found. The word, "mojn", is of German origin, where it is used as both a greeting and a farewell.

== Classification ==
Its combination of traits—especially the high tooth count, multiple tusk pairs, and elongated rostrum—places it among the more basal (early-diverging) beaked whales, similar in overall condition to long-snouted taxa like Messapicetus gregarius and Ninoziphius platyrostris, rather than the more specialized modern species.

== Description ==
Dagonodum was a medium-sized ziphiid with a very long snout (~70% of skull length) and an unusually large number of teeth, including roughly 29 per lower jaw and two pairs of forward-directed tusks. The skull bore a strong premaxillary crest and distinctive nasal and earbone features, while the mandible was long and slender. Many of the teeth, especially the apical tusks, show heavy wear, indicating frequent use.

== Paleobiology ==
Its dentition and wear patterns indicate a feeding style that likely involved grasping prey rather than relying purely on suction, unlike most living beaked whales. The presence of numerous functional teeth, deep alveoli, and a well-developed precoronoid crest suggests strong jaw musculature and active prey capture, likely targeting small fish or other firm-bodied prey like squid. Cranial features such as the robust premaxillary crest and reinforced vertex further imply head stabilization and possible intraspecific combat, supported by heavy tusk wear. The nasal and earbone morphology indicates a less specialized echolocation and hearing system, consistent with a shallower, coastal lifestyle rather than extreme deep diving. Postcranially, the unfused cervical vertebrae and relatively flexible neck contrast with modern beaked whales and suggest greater head mobility for prey capture, reinforcing its interpretation as a more basal, Messapicetus-like beaked whale.

== Paleoecology ==
Dagonodum is known from the Gram Formation of Denmark, which represents a shallow, coastal marine environment. The associated fauna includes a diverse assemblage of at least 128 mollusc species and six decapod crustaceans, as well as shark remains including the apex predator Otodus megalodon. Other cetaceans present include baleen whales such as Uranocetus gramensis and Tranatocetus argillarius, along with at least one delphinoid species.
