= 2013 in paleomammalogy =

This paleomammalogy list records new fossil mammal taxa that were described during the year 2013, as well as notes other significant paleomammalogy discoveries and events which occurred during that year.

== Non-eutherian mammals ==
=== Monotremes ===
Name	Novelty	Status	Authors	Age	Unit	Location	Notes	Images
Obdurodon tharalkooschild	Sp. nov	Valid	Pian, Archer & Hand	Neogene; estimates range from middle Miocene to Pliocene	Riversleigh	Australia	A relative of the platypus, a species of Obdurodon.	

=== Metatherians ===
Name	Novelty	Status	Authors	Age	Unit	Location	Notes	Images
Armintodelphys dufraingi	Sp. nov	Valid	Smith & Smith	Early Eocene	Tielt Formation	Belgium	A peradectid. Originally described as a species of Armintodelphys, but subsequently transferred to the genus Europeradectes by Gernelle, Ladevèze & Tabuce (2026).	
Bulungu	Gen. et 3 sp. nov	Valid	Gurovich et al.	Late Oligocene to Middle Miocene	Etadunna Formation; Riversleigh; Wipajiri Formation	Australia	A bandicoot. The type species is Bulungu palara Gurovich et al. (2013); genus also contains additional new species Bulungu muirheadae Travouillon et al. (2013) and Bulungu campbelli Travouillon et al. (2013).	
Eomicrobiotherium mykerum	Sp. nov	Valid	Goin & Abello	Miocene (Colhuehuapian)	Colhué Huapí Member	Argentina	A microbiotheriid marsupial, a species of Eomicrobiotherium.	
Fieratherium	Gen. et sp. nov	Valid	Forasiepi et al.	Late Oligocene	Agua de la Piedra Formation	Argentina	A relative of shrew opossums. The type species is Fieratherium sorex.	
Galadi adversus	Sp. nov	Valid	Travouillon et al.	Miocene	Riversleigh	Australia	A bandicoot, a species of Galadi.	
Galadi amplus	Sp. nov	Valid	Travouillon et al.	Miocene	Riversleigh	Australia	A bandicoot, a species of Galadi.	
Galadi grandis	Sp. nov	Valid	Travouillon et al.	Miocene	Riversleigh	Australia	A bandicoot, a species of Galadi.	
Litokoala dicksmithi	Sp. nov	Valid	Black, Louys & Price	Miocene	Riversleigh	Australia	A relative of koala, a species of Litokoala.	
Neohelos davidridei	Species	Valid	Black, Archer, Hand, & Godthelp	Middle Miocene	Riversleigh World Heritage Area fossil deposit	Australia	A diprotodontid, a species of Neohelos.	
Neohelos solus	Species	Valid	Black, Archer, Hand, & Godthelp	Middle Miocene	Riversleigh World Heritage Area fossil deposit	Australia	A diprotodontid, a species of Neohelos.	
Proargyrolagus argentinus	Sp. nov	Valid	Goin & Abello	Miocene (Colhuehuapian)	Colhué Huapí Member	Argentina	An argyrolagid metatherian, a species of Proargyrolagus.	

=== Others ===
Name	Novelty	Status	Authors	Age	Unit	Location	Notes	Images
Alopocosmodon	Gen. et sp. nov	Valid	Scott, Spivak & Sweet	Early Paleocene (middle Torrejonian)	Porcupine Hills Formation	Canada	A multituberculate, possibly a member of Microcosmodontidae. The type species is Alopocosmodon hadrus.	
Arboroharamiya	Gen. et sp. nov	Valid	Zheng et al.	Middle-Late Jurassic boundary	Tiaojishan Formation	China	A member of the (possibly paraphyletic) group Haramiyida. The type species is Arboroharamiya jenkinsi.	
Argillomys	Gen. et sp. nov	Valid	Cifelli, Gordon & Lipka	Early Cretaceous (Aptian)	Patuxent Formation	United States	A multituberculate. The type species is Argillomys marylandensis.	
Cimolodon peregrinus	Sp. nov	Valid	Donohue, Wilson & Breithaupt	Latest Cretaceous (Lancian)	Lance Formation	United States	A multituberculate, a species of Cimolodon.	
Dakotamys shakespeari	Sp. nov	Valid	Eaton	Late Cretaceous (Santonian)	Straight Cliffs Formation	United States	A multituberculate, a species of Dakotamys.	
Indobaatar	Gen. et sp. nov	Valid	Parmar, Prasad & Kumar	Early or Middle Jurassic	Kota Formation	India	An eobaatarid multituberculate. The type species is Indobaatar zofiae.	
Megaconus	Gen. et sp. nov	Valid	Zhou et al.	Middle Jurassic (at least 164 Ma)	Tiaojishan Formation	China	An eleutherodontid haramiyidan. The type species is Megaconus mammaliaformis.	
Rugosodon	Gen. et sp. nov	Valid	Yuan et al.	Late Jurassic (Oxfordian)	Tiaojishan Formation	China	A paulchoffatiid multituberculate. The type species is Rugosodon eurasiaticus.	

== Newly named eutherians ==
=== Xenarthrans ===
Name	Novelty	Status	Authors	Age	Unit	Location	Notes	Images
Anadasypus aequatorianus	Sp. nov	Valid	Carlini et al.	Late Miocene	Letrero Formation	Ecuador	An armadillo, a species of Anadasypus.	
Megistonyx	Gen. et sp. nov	Valid	McDonald, Rincón & Gaudin	Late Pleistocene (Lujanian)	Cueva de los Huesos	Venezuela	A megalonychid sloth. The type species is Megistonyx oreobios.	
Neosclerocalyptus castellanosi	Sp. nov	Valid	Zurita et al.	Late Pliocene		Argentina	A glyptodont, a species of Neosclerocalyptus.	
Prepoplanops	Gen. et sp. nov	Valid	Carlini, Brandoni & Dal Molin	Miocene	Cerro Boleadoras Formation	Argentina	A ground sloth. The type species is Prepoplanops boleadorensis.	
Scirrotherium antelucanus	Sp. nov	Valid	Laurito & Valerio	Late Miocene (early Hemphillian)		Costa Rica	A pampatheriid xenarthran, a species of Scirrotherium.	
Scirrotherium carinatum	Sp. nov	Valid	Góis et al.	Late Miocene (Huayquerian)	Ituzaingó Formation; Puerto Madryn Formation; Solimões Formation	Argentina; Brazil	A pampatheriid xenarthran. Originally described as a species of Scirrotherium; Jiménez-Lara (2020) transferred this species to the genus Kraglievichia.	

=== Odd-toed ungulates ===
Name	Novelty	Status	Authors	Age	Unit	Location	Notes	Images
Aceratherium porpani	Sp. nov	Valid	Deng, Hanta & Jintasakul	Late Miocene		Thailand	A rhinoceros, a species of Aceratherium.	
Brachypotherium minor	Sp. nov	Valid	Geraads & Miller	Early Miocene (c. 17 Ma)	Bakate Formation	Kenya	A rhinoceros, a species of Brachypotherium.	
Chalicotherium hebeiense	Sp. nov	Valid	Chen & Liu	Middle Miocene	Jiulongkou Formation	China	A chalicothere, a species of Chalicotherium.	
Eurygnathohippus woldegabrieli	Sp. nov	Valid	Bernor et al.	Pliocene		Ethiopia	A member of Hipparionini, a species of Eurygnathohippus.	
Guangnanodon	Gen. et sp. nov	Valid	Wang et al.	Paleogene (probably latest Eocene)	Yanshan Formation	China	An odd-toed ungulate related to Eggysodon. The type species is Guangnanodon youngi	
Hipparion (Hipparion) lufengense	Sp. nov	Valid	Sun	Late Miocene		China	An equid, a species of Hipparion.	
Molassitherium	Gen. et comb. et sp. nov	Valid	Becker, Antoine & Maridet	Early to early Late Oligocene		France; Germany; Hungary; Switzerland; Turkey	A rhinoceros. Genus contains "Aceratherium" albigense Roman (1912) and a new species Molassitherium delemontense (however, Tissier, Antoine & Becker, 2020 transferred M. delemontense to the genus Epiaceratherium).	
Pachynolophus eulaliensis	Sp. nov	Valid	Danilo et al.	Eocene, probably middle Ypresian		France	A palaeotheriid equoid odd-toed ungulate, a species of Pachynolophus.	
Sivalhippus anwari	Sp. nov	Valid	Wolf, Bernor & Hussain	Late Miocene	Sivalik Hills	Pakistan	An equid related to Hipparion, a species of Sivalhippus.	

=== Even-toed ungulates ===
Name	Novelty	Status	Authors	Age	Unit	Location	Notes	Images
Arretotherium meridionale	Sp. nov	Valid	Rincon et al.	Early Miocene		Panama	A bothriodontine anthracothere, a species of Arretotherium.	
Bison (Eobison) degiulii	Sp. nov	Valid	Masini, Palombo & Rozzi	Pleistocene		Italy	A species Bison. The binomial Eobison degiulii was originally introduced by Masini (1989) in a dissertation thesis which did not meet the criteria of formal publication; according to Kostopoulos, Maniakas & Tsoukala (2018) the name wasn't validly published until Masini, Palombo & Rozzi (2013) designated a holotype and provided a description of basic cranial features and comparisons, altogether constituting sufficient elements of an available nomenclature act in a published work under ICZN.	
Dama roberti	Sp. nov	Valid	Breda & Lister	Middle Pleistocene		France; United Kingdom	A relative of the fallow deer.	
Damalacra harrisi	Sp. nov	Valid	Geraads, Bobe & Manthi	Pliocene		Kenya	An alcelaphine bovid, a species of Damalacra.	
Eucladoceros dicranios tanaitensis	Subsp. nov.	Valid	Baygusheva & Titov	Early Pleistocene		Russia	A deer, a subspecies of Eucladoceros dicranios.	
Gerontochoerus koobiforaensis	Sp. nov	Valid	Pickford	Pliocene	Koobi Fora Formation	Kenya	A member of the family Suidae.	
Kolpochoerus millensis	Sp. nov	Valid	Haile-Selassie & Simpson	Pliocene	Woranso-Mille and Gona sites	Ethiopia	A suid, a species of Kolpochoerus.	
Myanmarius	Gen. et sp. nov	Valid	Tsubamoto et al.	Middle Eocene	Pondaung Formation	Myanmar	A member of Cetartiodactyla of uncertain phylogenetic placement, possibly a raoellid or a member of Suoidea. The type species is Myanmarius chitseini.	
Skinnerhyus shermerorum	Gen. et sp. nov	Valid	Prothero & Pollen	Miocene	Ash Hollow Formation	United States	A peccary, the type species is S. shermerorum.	
Woodburnehyus grenaderae	Gen. et sp. nov	Valid	Prothero & Pollen	Miocene	Green Valley Formation	United States	A peccary, the type species is W. grenaderae.	

=== Cetaceans ===
Name	Novelty	Status	Authors	Age	Unit	Location	Notes	Images
Balaenoptera bertae	Sp. nov	Valid	Boessenecker	Pliocene	Purisima Formation	United States	A rorqual, a species of Balaenoptera.	
Basilotritus	Gen. et sp. et comb. nov	Valid	Gol'din & Zvonok	Middle Eocene	Kiev Formation	Ukraine; United States	A basilosaurid cetacean. Genus contains "Eocetus" wardii Uhen (1999) and a new species Basilotritus uheni. Later study considered that it is synonmous with Pachycetus.	
Brachydelphis jahuayensis	Sp. nov	Valid	Lambert & De Muizon	Late Miocene (Tortonian)	Pisco Formation	Peru	A relative of the La Plata dolphin, a species of Brachydelphis.	
Choneziphius leidyi	Sp. nov	Valid	Bianucci et al.	Neogene (probably Late Early to Middle Miocene)		Atlantic Ocean floor off the Galician coast of Spain and the coast of Portugal	A beaked whale, a species of Choneziphius.	
Globicetus	Gen. et sp. nov	Valid	Bianucci et al.	Neogene (probably Late Early to Middle Miocene)		Atlantic Ocean floor off the Galician coast of Spain	A beaked whale. The type species is Globicetus hiberus.	
Imocetus	Gen. et sp. nov	Valid	Bianucci et al.	Neogene (probably Late Early to Middle Miocene)		Atlantic Ocean floor off the coast of Portugal	A beaked whale. The type species is Imocetus piscatus.	
Notoziphius	Gen. et sp. nov	Valid	Buono & Cozzuol	Late Miocene	Puerto Madryn Formation	Argentina	A beaked whale. The type species is Notoziphius bruneti.	
Parietobalaena campiniana	Sp. nov	Valid	Bisconti, Lambert & Bosselaers	Miocene		Belgium; Netherlands	A relative of cetotheriids, a species of Parietobalaena.	
Septidelphis	Gen. et sp. nov	Valid	Bianucci	Pliocene		Italy	A member of Delphinidae. The type species is Septidelphis morii.	
Tusciziphius atlanticus	Sp. nov	Valid	Bianucci et al.	Neogene (probably Late Early to Middle Miocene)		Atlantic Ocean floor off the Galician coast of Spain and the coast of Portugal; United States	A beaked whale, a species of Tusciziphius.	

=== Carnivorans ===
Name	Novelty	Status	Authors	Age	Unit	Location	Notes	Images
Buisnictis metabatos	Sp. nov	Valid	Wang, Carranza-Castañeda & Aranda-Gómez	Early Pliocene	San José del Cabo Basin	Mexico	A skunk, a species of Buisnictis.	
Chasmaporthetes gangsriensis	Sp. nov	Valid	Tseng, Li and Wang	Pliocene	Zanda Basin	China	A hyena, a species of Chasmaporthetes.	
Cyonarctos	Gen. et sp. nov	Valid	De Bonis	Late Oligocene		France	A hemicyonine. The type species is Cyonarctos dessei.	
Enhydriodon afman	Sp. nov.	Valid	Werdelin & Lewis	Pliocene		Kenya	An otter, a species of Enhydriodon	
Ferinestrix rapax	Sp. nov.	Valid	Wolsan & Sotnikova	Pliocene		Russia	A stem meline badger, a species of Ferinestrix.	
Filholictis	Gen. et comb. nov	Valid	De Bonis	Paleogene		France	A hemicyonine; a new genus for "Canis" filholi Munier-Chalmas in Filhol (1877).	
Genetta nyakitongwer	Sp. nov.	Valid	Werdelin & Lewis	Pleistocene		Kenya	A genet	
Hadrokirus	Gen. et sp. nov	Valid	Amson & de Muizon	Late Miocene or Early Pliocene	Pisco Formation	Peru	An earless seal. The type species is Hadrokirus martini.	
Hydrictis gudho	Sp. nov.	Valid	Werdelin & Lewis	Pleistocene		Kenya	An otter, related to the extant spotted-necked otter (Hydrictis maculicollis)	
Pachyphoca	Gen. et 2 sp. nov	Valid	Koretsky & Rahmat	Middle Miocene (middle Sarmatian, 12.3-11.2 Mya)		Ukraine	An earless seal related to the hooded seal. The type species is Pachyphoca ukrainica; genus also contains Pachyphoca chapskii.	
Pekania occulta	Sp. nov	Valid	Samuels & Cavin	Early Hemphillian	Rattlesnake Formation	United States	A relative of fishers, a species of Pekania.	
Rhizosmilodon	Gen. et sp. nov	Valid	Wallace & Hulbert	Early Pliocene	Bone Valley Formation	United States	A machairodontine felid. The type species is Rhizosmilodon fiteae.	
Teruelictis	Gen. et sp. nov	Valid	Salesa et al.	Late Miocene		Spain	An otter-like mustelid. The type species is Teruelictis riparius.	
Vulpes skinneri	Sp. nov	Valid	Hartstone-Rose et al.	Early Pleistocene		South Africa	A fox, a species of Vulpes.	

=== Lagomorphs ===
Name	Novelty	Status	Authors	Age	Unit	Location	Notes	Images
Amphilagus magnus	Sp. nov	Valid	Erbajeva	Early Miocene		Mongolia	A lagomorph, a species of Amphilagus.	
Amphilagus orientalis	Sp. nov	Valid	Erbajeva	Early Miocene		Mongolia	A lagomorph, a species of Amphilagus.	
Amphilagus plicadentis	Sp. nov	Valid	Erbajeva	Early Miocene		Mongolia	A lagomorph, a species of Amphilagus.	
Ephemerolagus	Gen. et sp. nov	Valid	Vianey-Liaud & Lebrun	Early Oligocene		France	A lagomorph. The type species is Ephemerolagus nievae.	
Limitolagus	Gen. et sp. nov.	Valid	Fostowicz-Frelik	Eocene (late Chadronian)		United States	A palaeolagid lagomorph. The type species is Limitolagus roosevelti.	

=== Rodents ===
Name	Novelty	Status	Authors	Age	Unit	Location	Notes	Images
Argorheomys	Gen. et sp. nov	Valid	Korth & Emry	Late middle Eocene (Duchesnean)		United States	A rodent related to Pipestoneomys. The type species is Argorheomys septendrionalis.	
Bransatoglis bosniensis	Sp. nov	Valid	de Bruijn, Marković & Wessels	Late Oligocene		Bosnia and Herzegovina	A dormouse, a species of Bransatoglis.	
Ceratogaulus robustus	Sp. nov	Valid	Korth	Middle Miocene	Tesuque Formation	United States	A mylagaulid rodent.	
Chardina gansuensis	Sp. nov	Valid	Liu et al.	Early Pliocene		China	A zokor, a species of Chardina.	
Deperetomys magnus	Sp. nov	Valid	de Bruijn, Marković & Wessels	Late Oligocene		Bosnia and Herzegovina; Serbia	A murid rodent, a species of Deperetomys.	
Eumyarion margueritae	Sp. nov	Valid	de Bruijn, Marković & Wessels	Late Oligocene		Bosnia and Herzegovina	A eumyarionine murid rodent, a species of Eumyarion.	
Garridomys	Gen. et sp. nov	Valid	Kramarz, Vucetich & Arnal	Early Miocene	Cerro Bandera Formation	Argentina	A rodent closely related to chinchillids. The type species is Garridomys curunuquem.	
Megacricetodon vandermeuleni	Sp. nov	Valid	Oliver & Peláez-Campomanes	Miocene (middle Aragonian)		Spain	A cricetid rodent, a species of Megacricetodon.	
Mesosiphneus primitivus	Sp. nov	Valid	Liu et al.	Early Pliocene		China	A zokor, a species of Mesosiphneus.	
Mimomys glendae	Sp. nov.	Valid	Mayhew	Early Pleistocene	Norwich Crag Formation	United Kingdom	An arvicoline rodent, a species of Mimomys.	
Ninamys	Gen. et comb. et sp. nov	Valid	Vianey-Liaud, Rodrigues & Marivaux	Oligocene to early Miocene		China; Mongolia; United States; Kazakhstan?	An aplodontiid rodent, a new genus for "Prosciurus" arboraptus Shevyreva 1971; genus also contains a new species Ninamys kazimierzi, "Campestrallomys" annectens Korth (1989) and possibly also "Prosciurus" daxnerae Lopatin 2000 (though Maridet et al., 2016 assigned this species to the genus Proansomys instead).	
Nonanomalurus	Gen. et comb. nov	Valid	Pickford et al.	Miocene		Kenya; Uganda	A member of Anomaluroidea; a new genus for "Paranomalurus" soniae Lavocat (1973).	
Notogaulus	Gen. et 2 sp. nov	Valid	Korth	Middle Miocene	Tesuque Formation	United States	A mylagaulid rodent. Genus contains two species: Notogaulus minor and N. major.	
Paracricetops	Gen. et sp. nov	Valid	Maridet & Ni	Early Oligocene		China	A cricetid rodent. The type species is Paracricetops virgatoincisus.	
Paradjidaumo disjunctus	Sp. nov	Valid	Korth	Paleogene		United States	An eomyid rodent, a species of Paradjidaumo.	
Paradjidaumo nanus	Sp. nov	Valid	Emry & Korth	Eocene (middle Chadronian)	White River Formation	United States	An eomyid rodent, a species of Paradjidaumo.	
Paransomys	Gen. et comb. nov	Valid	Vianey-Liaud, Rodrigues & Marivaux	Late Oligocene to early Miocene		Western Europe	An aplodontiid rodent, a new genus for "Sciurodon" descendens Dehm 1950, "Plesispermophilus" argoviensis Stehlin & Schaub 1951, and "Allomys" storeri Tedrow & Korth, 1997.	
Parapliosaccomys martini	Sp. nov	Valid	Kelly	Miocene (Hemphillian)	Coal Valley Formation	United States	A gopher, a species of Parapliosaccomys.	
Paronychomys jacobsi	Sp. nov	Valid	Kelly	Miocene (Hemphillian)	Coal Valley Formation	United States	A cricetid rodent, a species of Paronychomys.	
Proansomys	Gen. et sp. nov	Valid	Bi et al.	Late Oligocene	Suosuoquan Formation; Tieersihabahe Formation	China	An ansomyine aplodontid rodent. The type species is Proansomys dureensis.	
Protohummus	Gen. et sp. nov	Valid	Kraatz et al.	Late Miocene	Baynunah Formation	United Arab Emirates	A relative of cane rats. The type species is Protohummus dango.	
Protospermophilus minimus	Sp. nov	Valid	Korth	Miocene		United States	A ground squirrel, a species of Protospermophilus.	
Sciamys petisensis	Sp. nov	Valid	Arnal & Pérez	Middle Miocene		Argentina	An acaremyid rodent, a species of Sciamys.	
Simpligaulus	Gen. et sp. nov	Valid	Wu et al.	Early Middle Miocene	Halamagai Formation	China	A promylagauline mylagaulid rodent. The type species is Simpligaulus yangi.	
Tamias anatoliensis	Sp. nov	Valid	Bosma, De Bruijn & Wessels	Late Miocene		Turkey	A chipmunk.	
Vetusspalax	Gen. et sp. nov	Valid	de Bruijn, Marković & Wessels	Late Oligocene		Bosnia and Herzegovina	A relative of mole rats assigned to the genus Spalax. The type species is Vetusspalax progressus.	

=== Primates and plesiadapiforms ===
Name	Novelty	Status	Authors	Age	Unit	Location	Notes	Images
Archicebus	Gen. et sp. nov	Valid	Ni et al.	Early Eocene		China	A haplorhine primate. The type species is Archicebus achilles.	
Cartelles	Gen. et sp. nov	Valid	Halenar & Rosenberger	Pleistocene	Toca da Boa Vista cave	Brazil	A New World monkey, a relative of howler monkeys. The type species is Cartelles coimbrafilhoi.	
Foxomomys	Gen. et comb. nov	Valid	Chester & Bloch	Paleocene		Canada; United States	A micromomyid plesiadapiform, a new genus for "Micromomys" fremdi Fox (1984), "Micromomys" vossae Krause (1978) and "Micromomys" gunnelli Secord (2008).	
Hesperotarsius	Gen. et sp. et comb. nov	Valid	Zijlstra, Flynn & Wessels	Miocene		Pakistan; Thailand	A tarsier. Genus contains "Tarsius" thailandicus Ginsburg & Mein (1987) and a new species Hesperotarsius sindhensis.	
Krabia	Gen. et sp. nov	Valid	Chaimanee et al.	Late Eocene		Thailand	An amphipithecid primate. The type species is Krabia minuta.	
Nievesia	Gen. et sp. nov	Valid	Marigó, Minwer-Barakat & Moyà-Solà	Early Late Eocene		Spain	A notharctid adapiform. The type species is Nievesia sossisensis.	
Nsungwepithecus	Gen. et sp. nov	Valid	Stevens et al.	Oligocene (25.2 Myr)	Nsungwe Formation	Tanzania	An early Old World monkey. The type species is Nsungwepithecus gunnelli.	
Rukwapithecus	Gen. et sp. nov	Valid	Stevens et al.	Oligocene (25.2 Myr)	Nsungwe Formation	Tanzania	An early ape. The type species is Rukwapithecus fleaglei.	
Soromandrillus	Gen. et comb. nov	Valid	Gilbert	Pliocene to Pleistocene	Shungura Formation; Usno Formation	Angola; Ethiopia	An Old World monkey belonging to the subfamily Cercopithecinae and to the tribe Papionini. The type species is "Papio" quadratirostris Iwamoto (1982).	
Zanycteris honeyi	Sp. nov	Valid	Burger	Late Paleocene	Fort Union Formation	United States	A picrodontid plesiadapiform, a species of Zanycteris.	

=== Others ===
Name	Novelty	Status	Authors	Age	Unit	Location	Notes	Images
Anthraconyx	Gen. et sp. nov	Valid	Rose et al.	Early Eocene	Cambay Shale Formation	India	A member of Tillodontia. The type species is Anthraconyx hypsomylus.	
Aphronorus bearspawensis	Sp. nov	Valid	Scott, Spivak & Sweet	Early Paleocene (middle Torrejonian)	Porcupine Hills Formation	Canada	A pentacodontid cimolestan, a species of Aphronorus.	
Apulogalerix	Gen. et sp. nov	Valid	Masini & Fanfani	Late Miocene		Italy	A gymnure. The type species is Apulogalerix pusillus.	
Archaeoparadoxia	Gen. et comb. nov	Valid	Barnes	Late Oligocene	Skooner Gulch Formation	United States	A paleoparadoxiid desmostylian; a new genus for "Paleoparadoxia" weltoni Clark (1991).	
Archaeoryctes wangi	Sp. nov	Valid	Missiaen et al.	Middle Paleocene		China	A member of Didymoconidae, a species of Archaeoryctes.	
Batodonoides rileyi	Sp. nov	Valid	Kelly	Eocene (late Uintan)	Sespe Formation	United States	A member of Geolabididae, a species of Batodonoides.	
Ceruttia	Gen. et sp. nov	Valid	Tomiya	Eocene (Uintan)	Mission Valley Formation; Santiago Formation	United States	A member of Carnivoramorpha and Carnivoraformes. The type species is Ceruttia sandiegoensis.	
Deinogalerix masinii	Sp. nov	Valid	Villier et al.	Miocene		Italy	A gymnure, a species of Deinogalerix.	
Eudaemonema bohachae	Sp. nov	Valid	Scott, Spivak & Sweet	Early Paleocene (middle Torrejonian)	Porcupine Hills Formation	Canada	A mixodectid, a species of Eudaemonema.	
Fordonia lawsoni	Sp. nov	Valid	Hooker	Earliest Eocene		United Kingdom	A pseudorhyncocyonid, a species of Fordonia.	
Galecyon gallus	Sp. nov	Valid	Solé, Gheerbrant & Godinot	Early Eocene		France	A sinopanine hyaenodontid, a species of Galecyon.	
Hegetotheriopsis	Gen. et sp. nov	Valid	Kramarz & Paz	Late Oligocene and Miocene (Colhuehuapian)	Sarmiento Formation	Argentina	A hegetotheriid notoungulate. The type species is Hegetotheriopsis sulcatus.	
Leptictidium listeri	Sp. nov	Valid	Hooker	Middle Eocene		Germany	A pseudorhyncocyonid, a species of Leptictidium.	
Leptictidium prouti	Sp. nov	Valid	Hooker	Earliest Eocene		United Kingdom	A pseudorhyncocyonid, a species of Leptictidium.	
Leptictidium storchi	Sp. nov	Valid	Hooker	Late Eocene		France	A pseudorhyncocyonid, a species of Leptictidium.	
Mistralestes	Gen. et sp. nov	Valid	Tabuce et al.	Late Cretaceous (late Campanian)		France	A possible zhelestid. The type species is Mistralestes arcensis.	
Neoparadoxia	Gen. et sp. et comb. nov	Valid	Barnes	Middle to early late Miocene		United States	A paleoparadoxiid desmostylian. The type species is Neoparadoxia cecilialina; genus also contains "Paleoparadoxia" repenningi Domning & Barnes (2007).	
Phakodon	Gen. et comb. nov	Valid	Hooker	Paleocene		France	A pseudorhyncocyonid, a new genus for "Bessoecetor" levei Russell, Louis & Poirier (1966).	
Piauhytherium	Gen. et sp. nov	Valid	Guérin & Faure	Late Pleistocene		Brazil	A toxodontid. The type species is Piauhytherium capivarae.	
Promioclaenus thnetus	Sp. nov	Valid	Scott, Spivak & Sweet	Early Paleocene (middle Torrejonian)	Porcupine Hills Formation	Canada	A mioclaenid, a species of Promioclaenus.	
Sasayamamylos	Gen. et sp. nov	Valid	Kusuhashi et al.	Early Cretaceous (early Albian)		Japan	A eutherian related to Ukhaatherium, Asioryctes and Kennalestes. The type species is Sasayamamylos kawaii.	
Sorex bifidus	Sp. nov	Valid	Rzebik-Kowalska	?Late Pliocene/Early Pleistocene boundary and middle Early Pleistocene		Poland	A red-toothed shrew, a species of Sorex.	
Vassacyon taxidiotis	Sp. nov	Valid	Solé, Gheerbrant & Godinot	Early Eocene		France	A "miacid" carnivoramorph, a species of Vassacyon.	
Walshius	Gen. et sp. nov	Valid	Tomiya	Eocene (Uintan)	Friars Formation	United States	A member of Carnivoramorpha and Carnivoraformes. The type species is Walshius pacificus.	
