= Giday WoldeGabriel =

Ethiopian geologist

- Born: Ethiopia
- Education: Case Western Reserve University
- Known for: Co-discovery of human remains at Herto Bouri(Homo sapiens idaltu)
- Scientific career
- Fields: Geology, Geochemistry
- Workplaces: Los Alamos National Laboratory

Giday WoldeGabriel is an Ethiopian geologist at Los Alamos National Laboratory, who co-discovered human skeletal remains at Herto Bouri, Ethiopia, now classified as Homo sapiens idaltu.

== Life ==
He graduated from Case Western Reserve University.

An extinct species of prehistoric horse, Eurygnathohippus woldegabrieli, was named in his honor.
