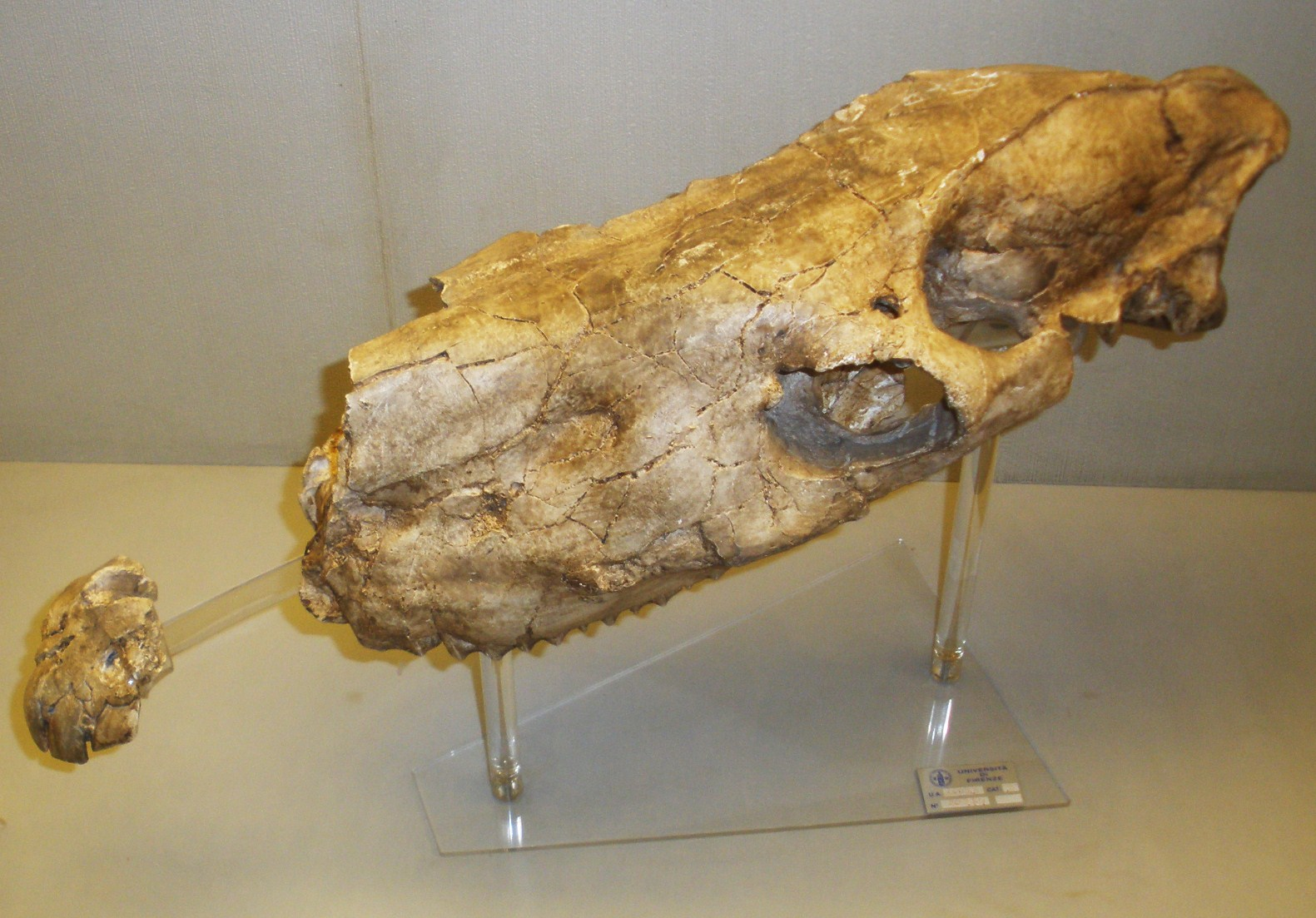
- H. afarense skull

Scientific classification
- Kingdom: Animalia
- Phylum: Chordata
- Class: Mammalia
- Order: Perissodactyla
- Family: Equidae
- Subfamily: Equinae
- Tribe: †Hipparionini
- Genus: †Eurygnathohippus; Van Hoepen, 1930

Species
- E. afarense; E. albertense; E. baardi; E. cornelianus; E. hasumense; E. hooijeri; E. libycum; E. namaquense; E. turkanense; E. woldegabrieli

= Eurygnathohippus =

Eurygnathohippus Temporal range: Late Miocene-Pleistocene, 7.246–0.781 Ma

Extinct genus of mammals

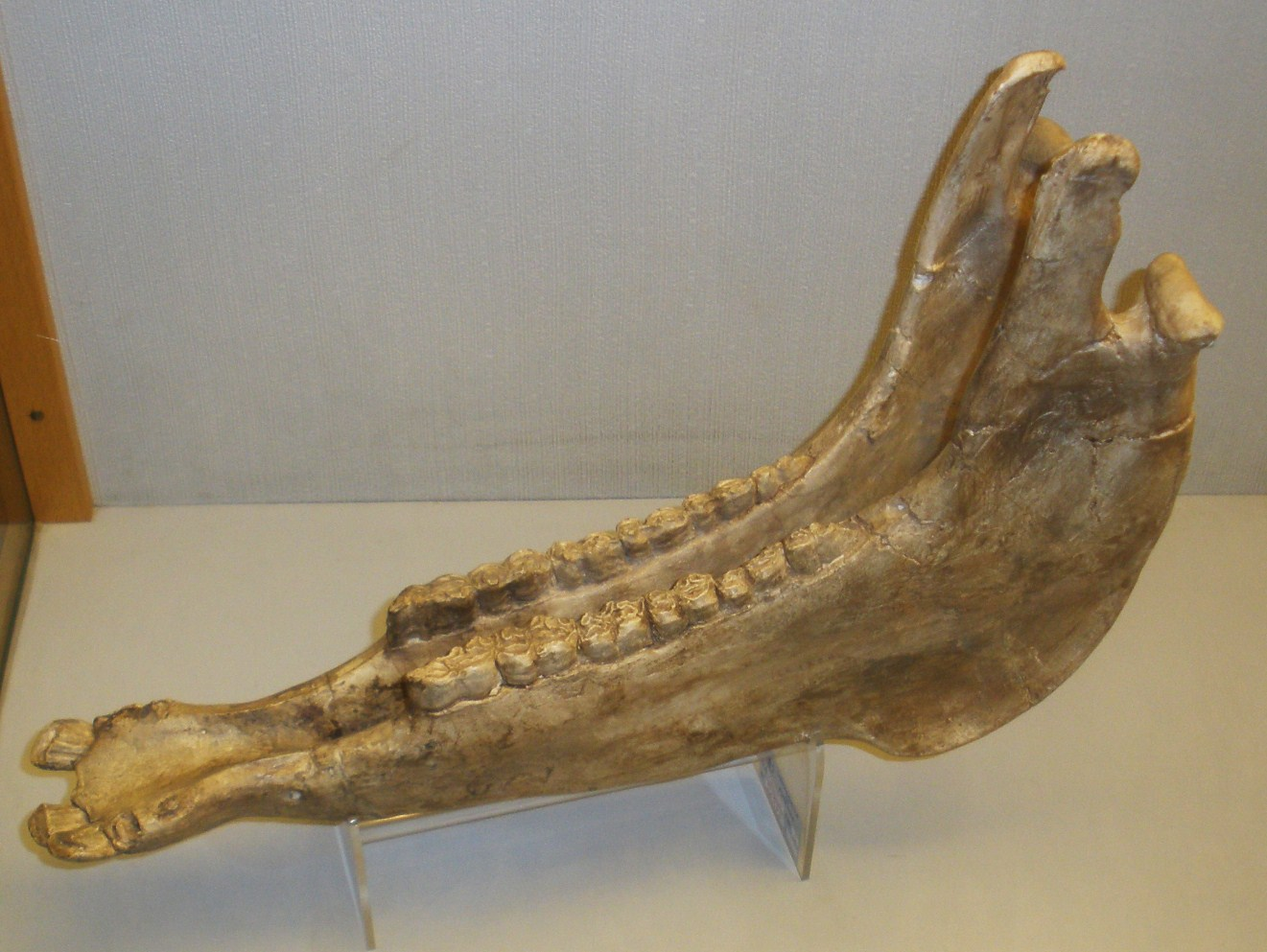
H. afarense mandible

Eurygnathohippus is an extinct genus of hipparionine horse. The majority of known fossils of members of this genus were discovered in Africa, where members of this genus lived during the late Miocene to Pleistocene interval. Fossils of Eurygnathohippus were also reported from the late Pliocene sediments of the Potwar Plateau in Pakistan and the Siwalik Hills in northwest India.

== Palaeobiology ==
=== Life history ===
The osteohistology of E. hooijeri from Langebaanweg suggests that it had a slow life history, with its ages of weaning, skeletal maturity, and reproductive maturity being reached relatively late when compared to extant members of Equus and to three-toed equids in Europe. Adults of the species had low extrinsic mortality, but juveniles would have experienced high mortality rates.
