= Argorheomys =

Argorheomys Temporal range: Bartonian

Scientific classification
- Kingdom: Animalia
- Phylum: Chordata
- Class: Mammalia
- Infraclass: Placentalia
- Order: Rodentia
- Family: †Pipestoneomyidae
- Genus: †Argorheomys; Korth & Emry, 2013
- Species: †A. septendrionalis

Binomial name
- †Argorheomys septendrionalis Korth & Emry, 2013

Genus of mammals

Argorheomys is an extinct genus of pipestoneomyid rodent that lived during the Bartonian stage of the Eocene epoch.

== Distribution ==
Argorheomys septendrionalis is known from Duchesnean deposits in the Cypress Hills Formation of Saskatchewan, Canada.
