= Dama roberti =

Dama roberti Temporal range: Middle Pleistocene

Scientific classification
- Domain: Eukaryota
- Kingdom: Animalia
- Phylum: Chordata
- Class: Mammalia
- Order: Artiodactyla
- Family: Cervidae
- Genus: Dama
- Species: D. roberti

Binomial name
- Dama roberti Breda and Lister, 2013

Extinct species of fallow deer

Dama roberti is an extinct species of fallow deer that lived in Europe during the early Middle Pleistocene.

== Distribution ==
Fossils of D. roberti are known from England, France, and Italy.
