= Eurygnathohippus woldegabrieli =

Eurygnathohippus woldegabrieli Temporal range: Middle Pliocene

Scientific classification
- Domain: Eukaryota
- Kingdom: Animalia
- Phylum: Chordata
- Class: Mammalia
- Order: Perissodactyla
- Family: Equidae
- Genus: †Eurygnathohippus
- Species: †E. woldegabrieli

Binomial name
- †Eurygnathohippus woldegabrieli Bernor et al., 2013

Extinct species of horse

Eurygnathohippus woldegabrieli is an extinct species of prehistoric horse. The 4.4 to 4.2 million-year-old fossils of its teeth and bones were found in 2001 and 2002 in Ethiopia. It was identified as a new species in 2013 by researchers at Case Western Reserve University, and the species named after geologist and Case Western alumnus Giday WoldeGabriel.

The species was estimated to be about the size of a small zebra, and had three-toed hooves. Tooth wear patterns and analyses of bone composition indicate that E. woldegabrieli grazed on grasses similar to the coarse C_{4} diet of modern zebras or wildebeests. Compared to ancestral Eurygnathohippus horses of six to ten million years ago such as the late Miocene E. feibeli, which lived and ate in forests, E. woldegabrieli's teeth were taller and more worn, and its longer and thinner leg bones suggest that it was well adapted for running. The medial Pliocene species E. hasumense, a more advanced horse from 3.5 million years ago and forward, is both taller and has a longer nose than E. woldegabrieli, a further advanced adaptation toward living in open grasslands.
