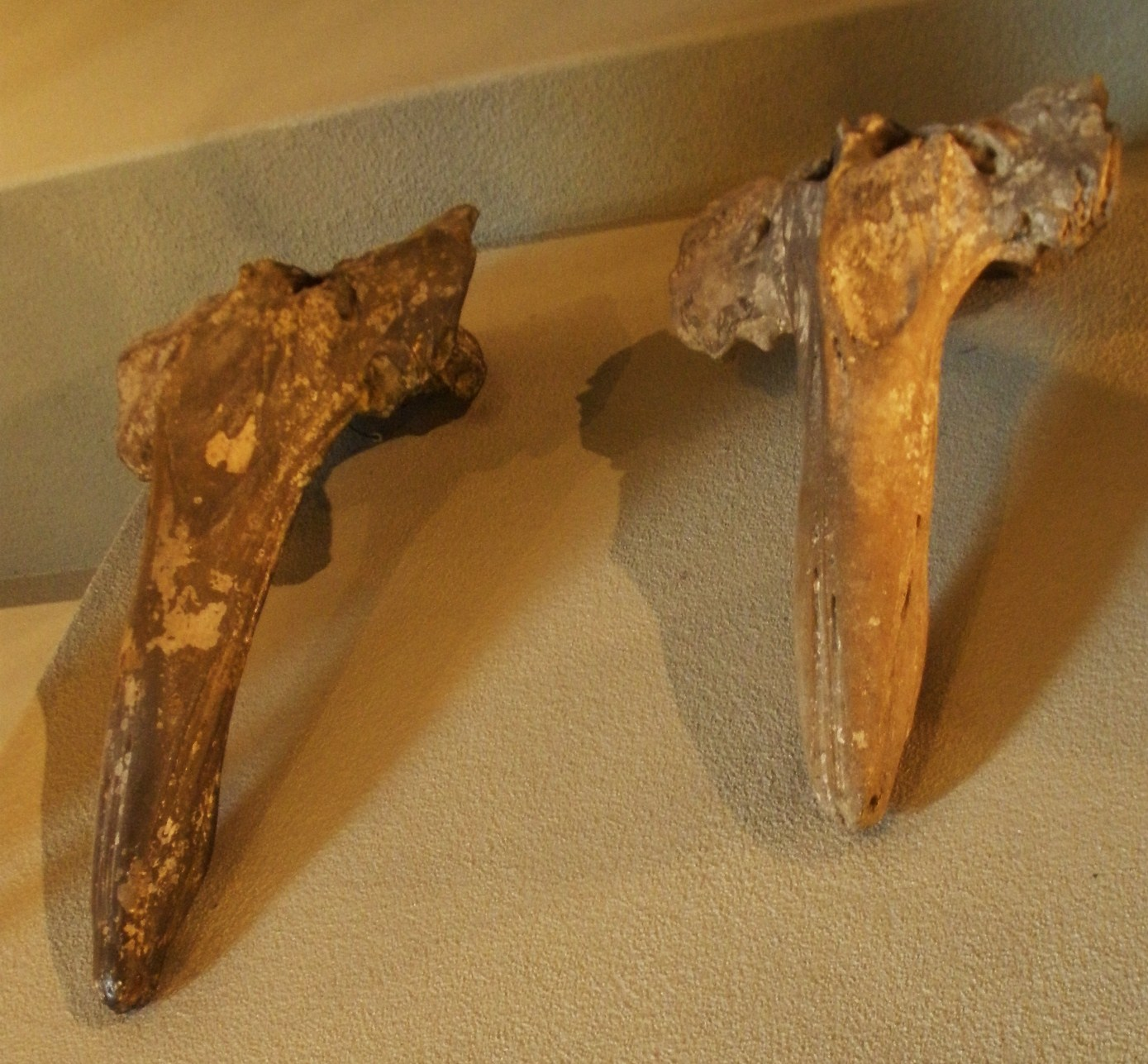
- Choneziphius planirostris fossils

Scientific classification
- Domain: Eukaryota
- Kingdom: Animalia
- Phylum: Chordata
- Class: Mammalia
- Order: Artiodactyla
- Infraorder: Cetacea
- Family: Ziphiidae
- Genus: †Choneziphius; Duvernoy, 1851

Species
- †C. planirostris (Cuvier, 1824) [originally Ziphius] (type); †C. leidyi Bianucci, Miján, Lambert, Post, and Mateus, 2013

Synonyms
- Proroziphius Leidy, 1876

= Choneziphius =

Choneziphius Temporal range: Miocene

Extinct genus of mammals

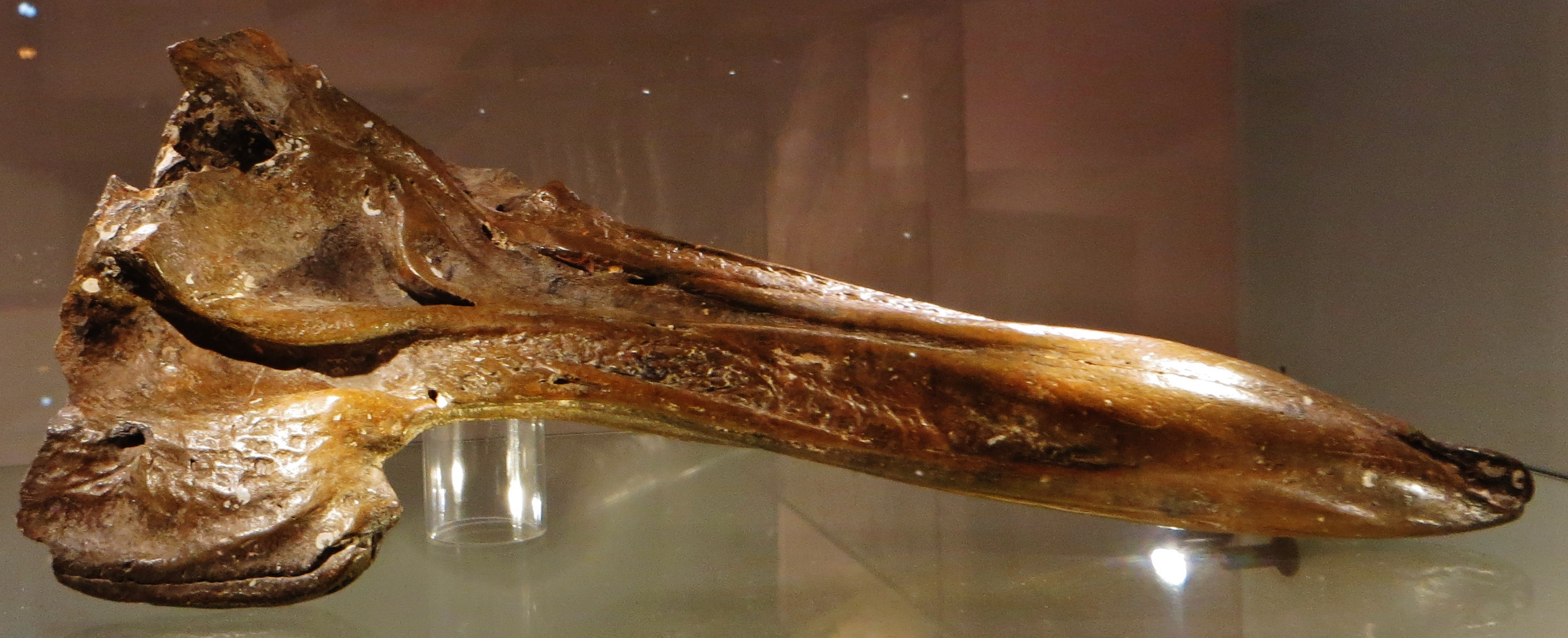
Skull

Choneziphius is an extinct genus of ziphiidae cetaceans, with two species known from the Miocene: C. planirostris and C. leidyi. Known from the shore of Belgium, Portugal and Spain.
