= Paracricetops =

Paracricetops Temporal range: Early Oligocene

Scientific classification
- Kingdom: Animalia
- Phylum: Chordata
- Class: Mammalia
- Infraclass: Placentalia
- Order: Rodentia
- Family: Cricetidae
- Genus: †Paracricetops; Maridet & Ni, 2013
- Species: †P. virgatoincisus

Binomial name
- †Paracricetops virgatoincisus Maridet & Ni, 2013

Extinct genus of rodents

Paracricetops is an extinct genus of rodents that lived during the Rupelian stage of the Oligocene epoch.

== Distribution ==
Paracricetops virgatoincisus fossils are known from the Caijiachong locality in Yunnan.
