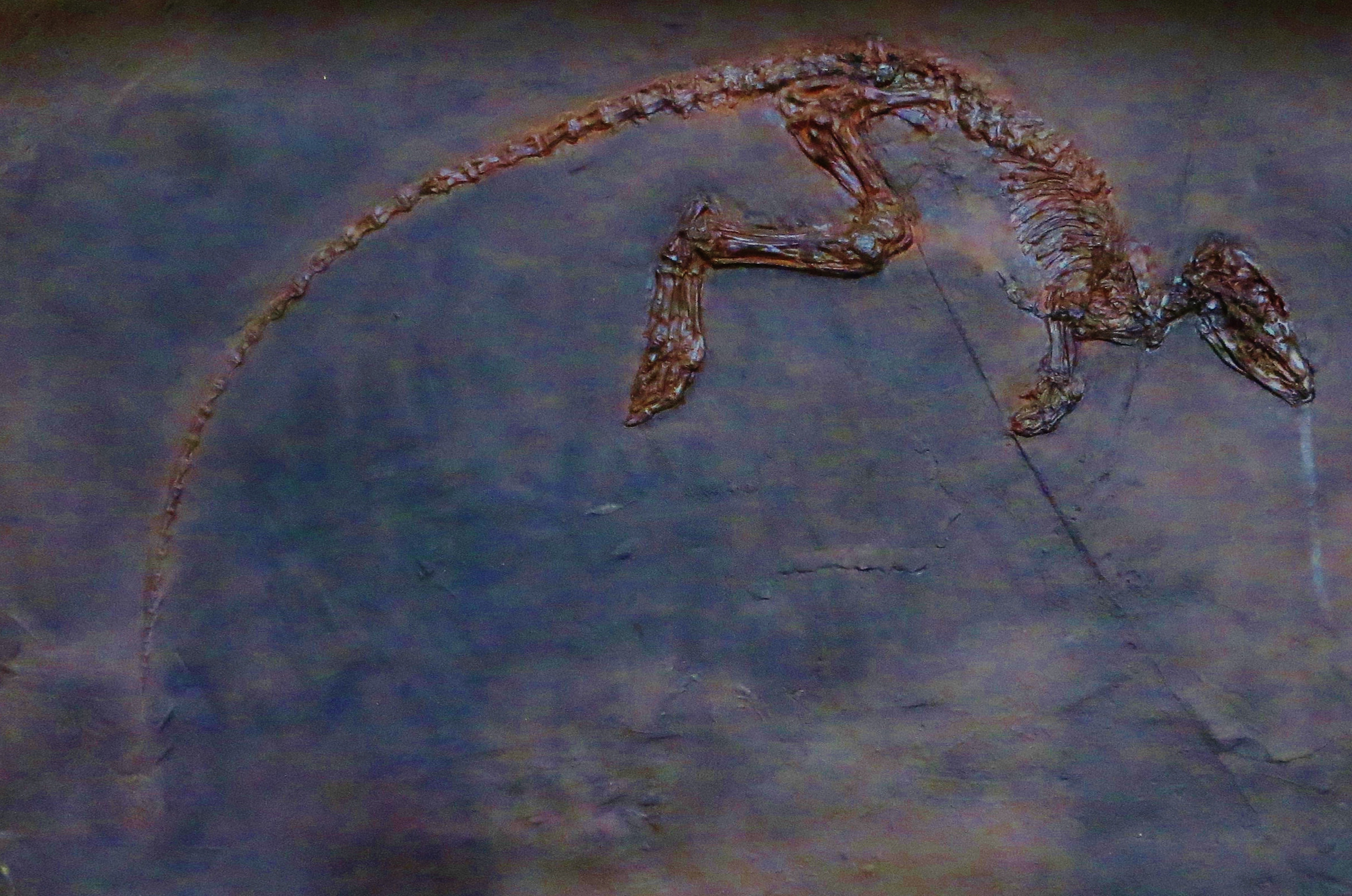
- Fossil L. auderiense skeleton, Muséum national d'histoire naturelle

Scientific classification
- Kingdom: Animalia
- Phylum: Chordata
- Class: Mammalia
- Order: †Leptictida
- Family: †Pseudorhyncocyonidae
- Genus: †Leptictidium; Tobien, 1962

Type species
- †Leptictidium auderiense Tobien, 1962

Species
- L. auderiense Tobien, 1962; L. nasutum Lister & Storch, 1985; L. tobieni Koenigswald & Storch, 1987; L. ginsburgi Mathis, 1989; L. sigei Mathis, 1989; L. listeri Hooker, 2013; L. prouti Hooker, 2013; L. storchi Hooker, 2013

= Leptictidium =

Leptictidium Temporal range: Early to Late Eocene, 50–35 Ma

Extinct genus of mammals

Leptictidium is an extinct genus of small mammals that were likely bipedal. Comprising eight species, they resembled today's bilbies, bandicoots, and sengis, and occupied a similar niche. They are especially interesting for their combination of characteristics typical of primitive eutherians with highly specialized adaptations, such as powerful hind legs and a long tail which aided in locomotion. They were omnivorous, their diet a combination of insects, lizards, frogs, and small mammals. Leptictidium and other leptictids are not placentals, but are non-placental eutherians, although they are closely related to placental eutherians. They appeared in the Lower Eocene, a time of warm temperatures and high humidity, roughly fifty million years ago. Although they were widespread throughout Europe, they became extinct around thirty-five million years ago with no descendants, as they were adapted to live in forest ecosystems and were unable to adapt to the open plains of the Oligocene.

== Description ==
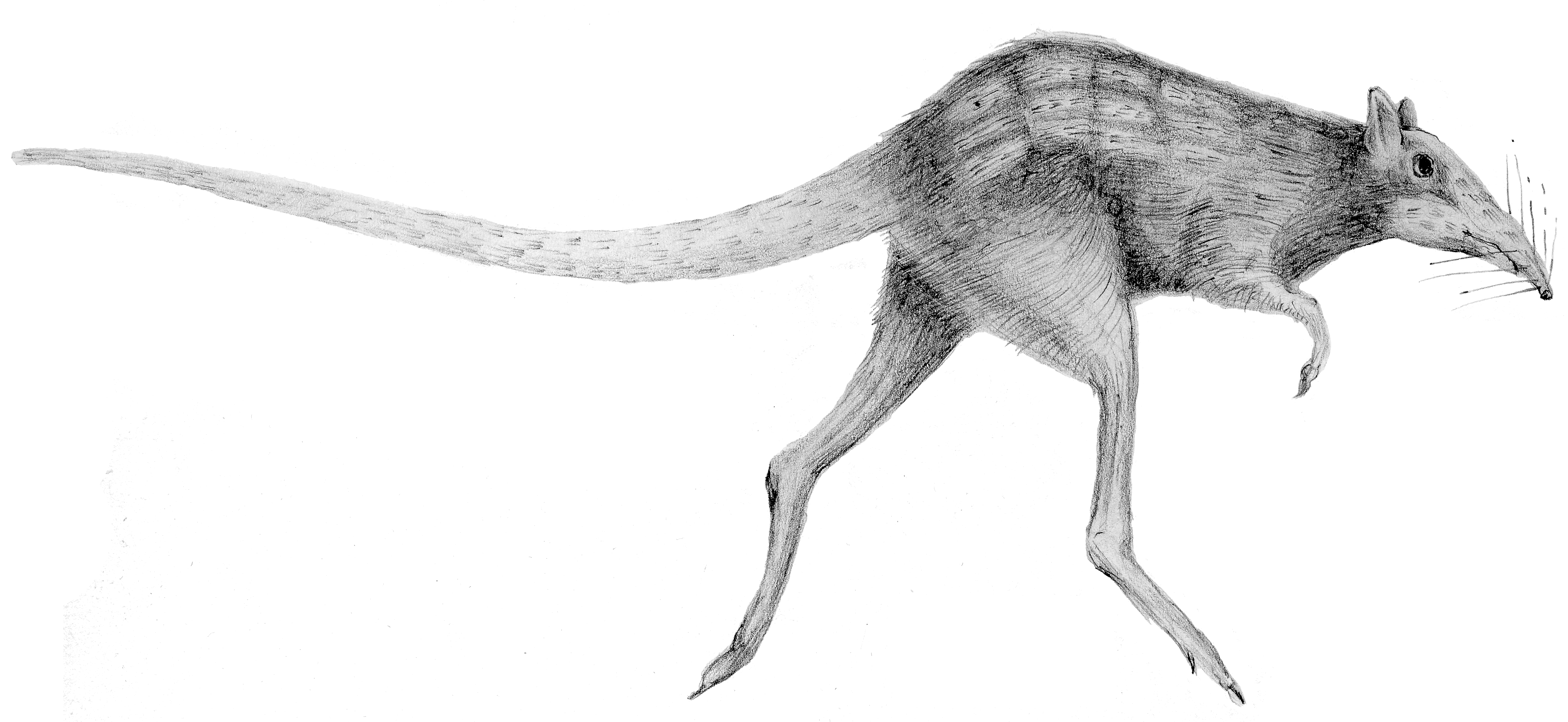
Illustration

Leptictidium is a special animal because of the way its anatomy combines quite primitive elements with elements which prove a high degree of specialization. It had small fore legs and large hind legs, especially at the distal side (that further from the body). The lateral phalanges of its forelegs (fingers I and V) were very short and weak, finger III was longer and fingers II and IV were roughly equal in size, and slightly shorter than finger III. The tips of the phalanges were elongated and tapered.

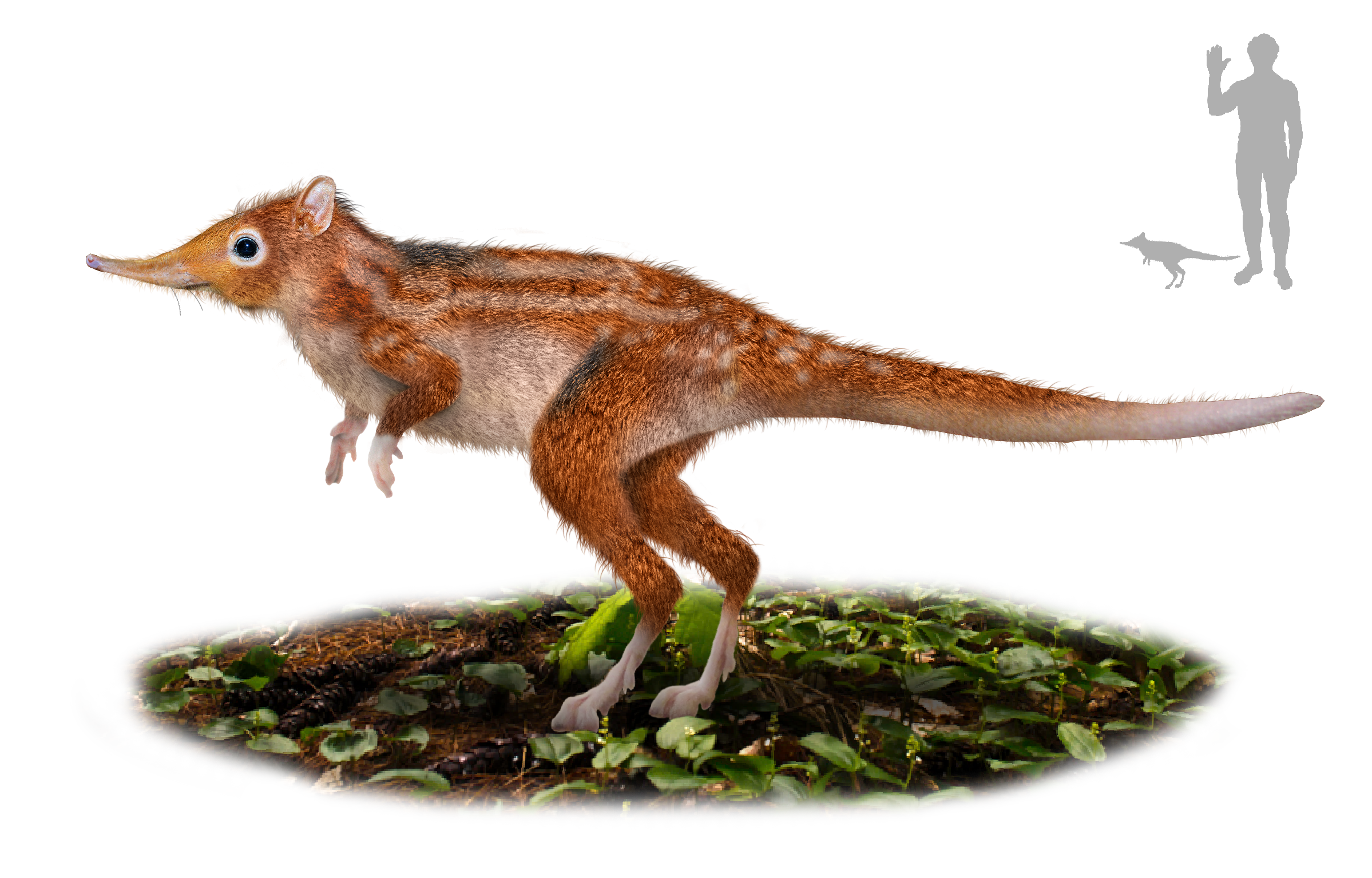
Artist's impression of a Leptictidium

The ankles and the sacroiliac joint were quite loosely fixed, while the pelvis had a flexible joint with only one coccygeal vertebra. The anteorbital muscle fenestrae in their crania suggest they probably had a long and mobile snout (or Proboscis), similar to that of sengis.

Leptictidium had wide diastemata in the antemolar row, its upper molar teeth were more transverse than those of the North American leptictids and its fourth premolars were molariform. Its C1 canines were incisiviform. Its dentition was quite small in comparison to the size of the mandible and the animal as a whole.

It varied between 60 and 90 cm (24 and 35 in) in length (more than half of which belonged to the tail), and 20 cm (7.9 in) in height. It weighed a couple of kilograms. These sizes could vary from one specimen to another. Leptictidium tobieni from Messel (Germany) is the largest known leptictid with skull 101 mm (4.0 in) long, head with trunk 375 mm (14.8 in) long, and tail 500 mm (20 in) long.

=== Locomotion ===
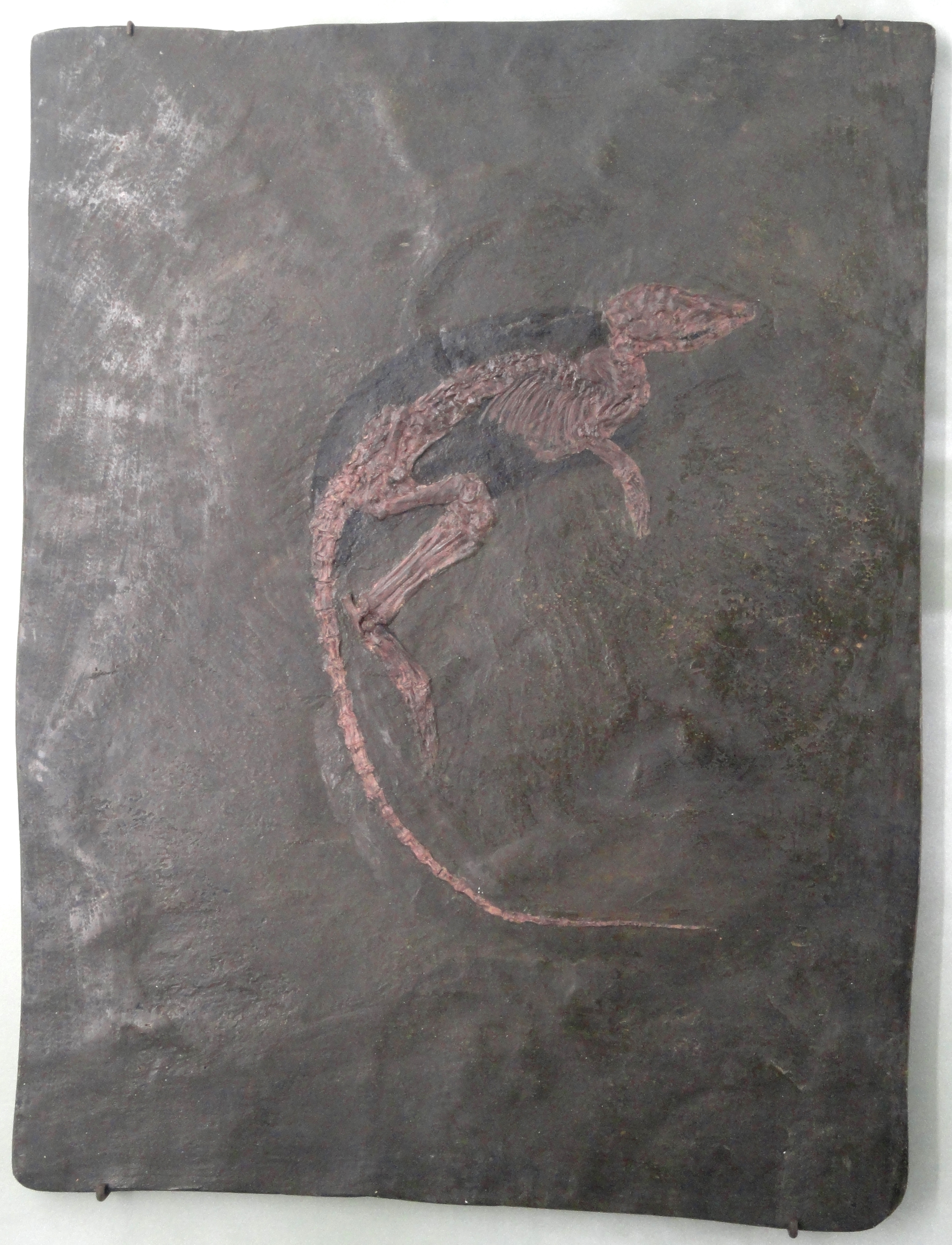
L. nasutum fossil

One of the mysteries about Leptictidium is whether it moved by running or by jumping. Because there are very few completely bipedal mammals, it is difficult to find an appropriate living model to compare it with. If the kangaroo is used, it is probable that Leptictidium hopped along with its body tilted forward, using its tail as a counterweight. On the other hand, sengis combine both types of locomotion; they usually move on four legs, but they can run on two legs to flee from a predator. Studies of the bone structure of Leptictidium have yielded contradicting information: its leg articulations appear too weak to have supported the shock of repeated jumps, but its long feet were obviously adapted for jumping rather than running.

Kenneth D. Rose compared the species L. nasutum with the leptictid Leptictis dakotensis. L. dakotensis had a series of traits which show it was a running animal which sometimes moved by jumping. Despite the marked similarities between Leptictis and Leptictidium, there are certain differences in their skeletons which prevent the example of Leptictis from being used to determine with certainty the way Leptictidium moved: the most important being that, unlike Leptictis, the tibia and the fibula of Leptictidium were not fused together.

== Behaviour ==
Perfectly preserved fossils of three different species of Leptictidium have been found in the Messel pit in Germany. The marks on their fur have been preserved, as well as their stomach contents, which reveal Leptictidium were omnivores which fed on insects, lizards and small mammals. The holotype of L. tobieni also had pieces of leaves and notable amounts of sand in its abdomen, but it cannot be determined with certainty if the animal swallowed it.

== Habitat ==
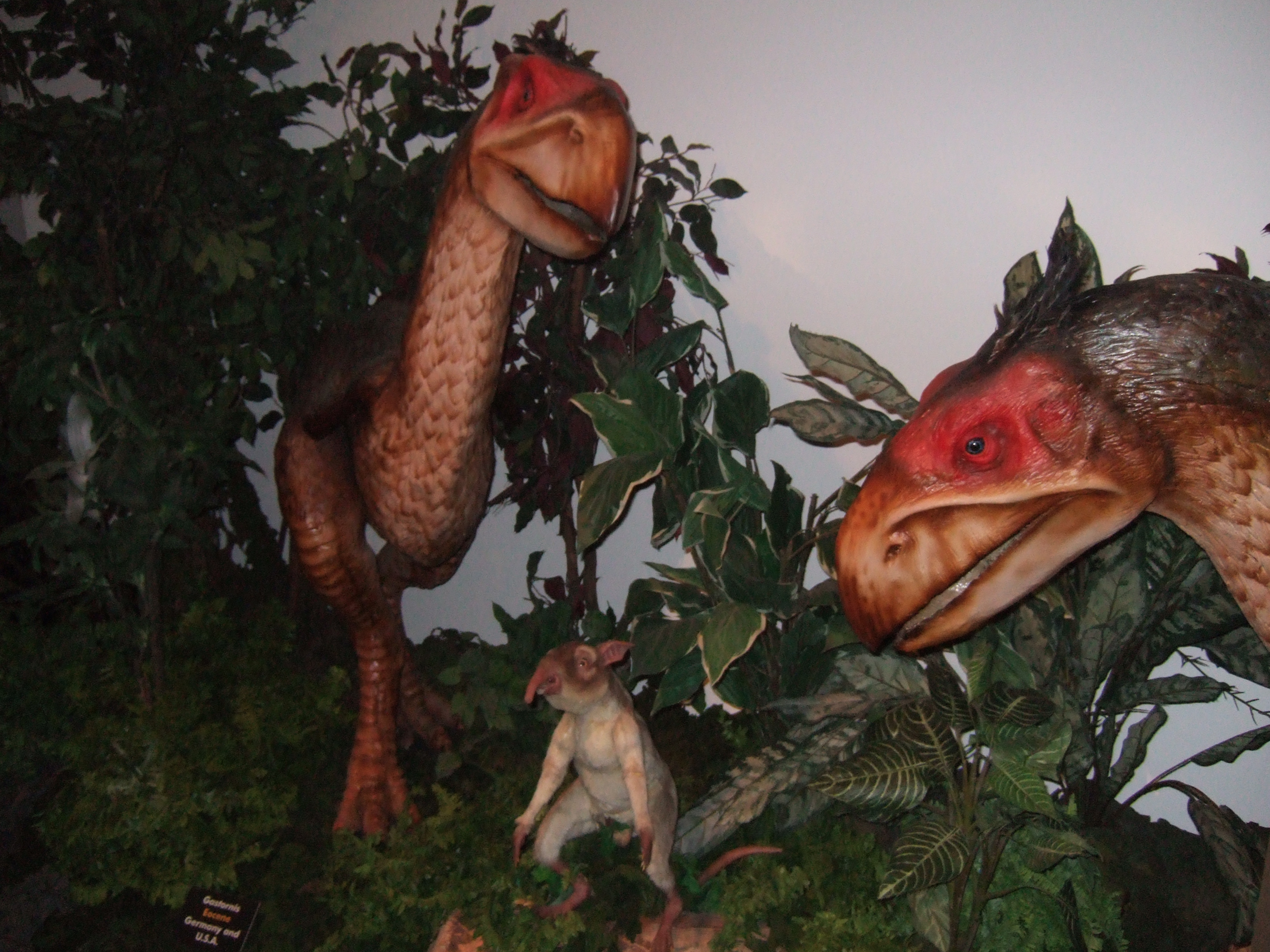
Leptictidium and Gastornis as shown in Walking With Beasts on exhibition in Horniman Museum, London

Leptictidium lived in the European subtropical forests of the Eocene. From the beginning of this period, the temperature of the planet rose in one of the quickest (in geological terms) and most extreme episodes of global warming in the geological record, termed Paleocene–Eocene Thermal Maximum. It was an episode of quick and intense (of up to 7 °C in high latitudes) warming which lasted less than 100,000 years. The thermal maximum caused a great extinction which is used to distinguish the Eocene fauna from that of the Paleocene.

The global climate of the Eocene was probably the most homogeneous of the Cenozoic; the temperature gradient from the equator to the poles was half that of today's, and the deep ocean currents were exceptionally warm. The polar regions were much warmer than today, possibly as warm as the present-day Pacific Northwest of North America. Temperate forests reached the poles themselves, while rainy tropical climates reached 45° N. The greatest difference was in temperate latitudes; nevertheless, the climate at the tropics was probably similar to today's.

In the Eocene, most of what is now Europe, the Mediterranean and south-west Asia was submerged under the Tethys Sea. These two continents were separated by the Turgai Strait (an epeiric sea). Due to high humidity and temperatures, most of the European continent was covered in vegetation.

The region which today is Germany was in a volcanically active zone during the Eocene. It is thought that the Messel pit could have been the old location of a volcanic lake saturated with CO_{2}. The lake would periodically release the gas it contained, creating a lethal cloud which would asphyxiate any animal in its path. This would explain the great number of non-aquatic species which have been found in the old lake-bed of the Messel pit.

In the lush forests of this region, Leptictidium shared its habitat with animals such as Godinotia, Pholidocercus, Palaeotis, or Propalaeotherium. There were also predators, the crocodilian Asiatosuchus, the hyaenodont Lesmesodon, and the Messel giant ant.

== Species ==
The genus Leptictidium includes eight species. These include:

=== Leptictidium auderiense ===
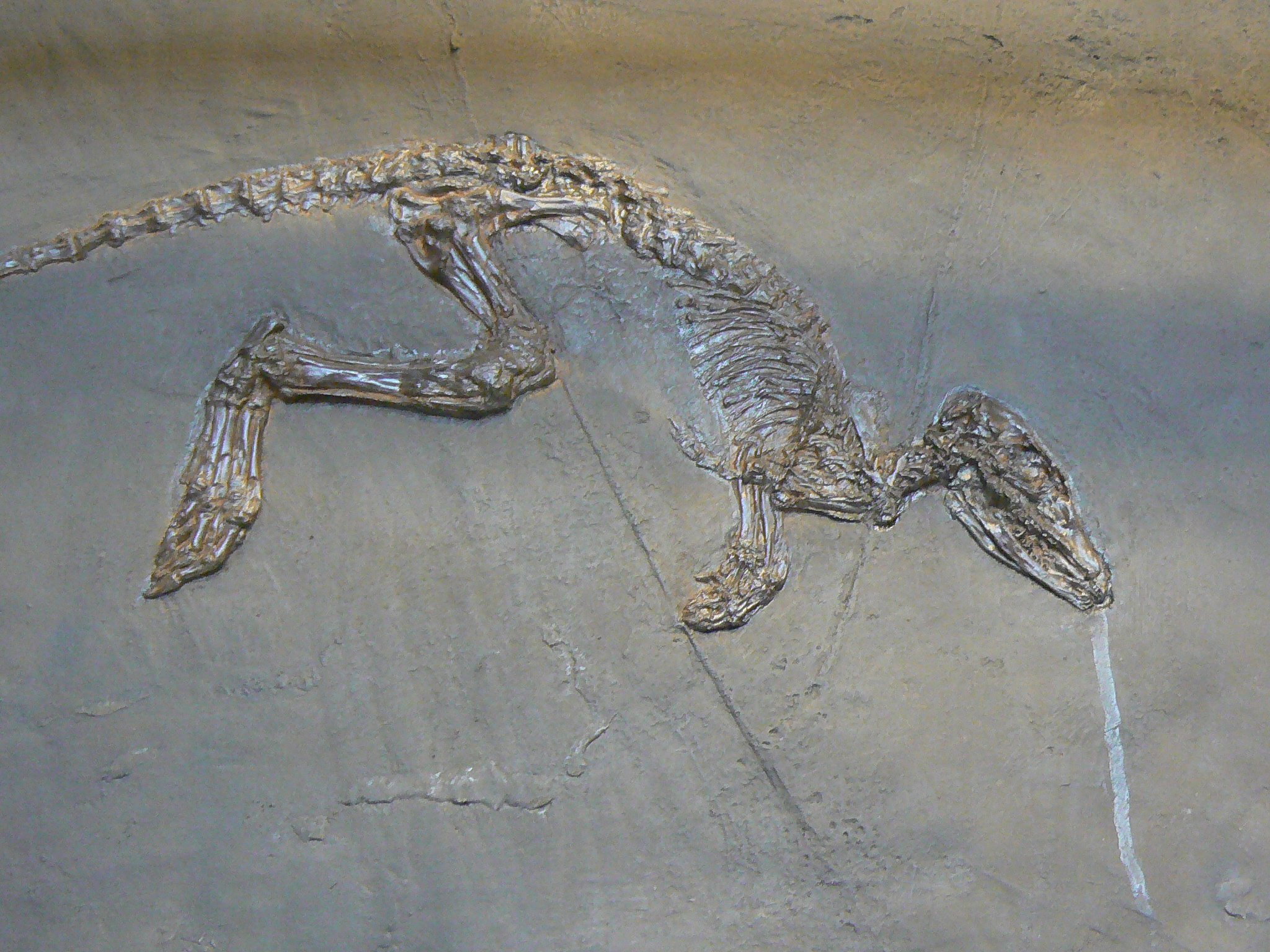
L. auderiense

Described by Heinz Tobien in 1962 based on a series of lower jaws from the Lutetian faunal stage. Tobien also uncovered a small skeleton he defined as a paratype of the species, but Storch and Lister proved in 1985 that, in fact, the skeleton did not even belong to the genus Leptictidium. It was the smallest species of all and was only sixty centimetres long. Several skeletons have been found at the Messel pit. Mathis remarks the exceptional development of the paraconid (or mesiobucal cusp) of the lower P4 premolar. Its premolars and molars were quite small in comparison to the dentition as a whole. The name of the species refers to the Roman settlement of Auderia.

=== Leptictidium ginsburgi ===
Described by Christian Mathis in 1989. Fossils have been found in the Quercy Phosphorites lagerstätte at the Robiac, Le Bretou, Lavergne, La Bouffie, Les Clapiès, Malpérié and Perrière localities(France), within Upper Ludian aged strata. The mesostyle typical of the genus Leptictidium is not developed in this species. The species is dedicated to Léonard Ginsburg, French paleontologist and deputy director of the Muséum national d'histoire naturelle in París.

=== Leptictidium nasutum ===
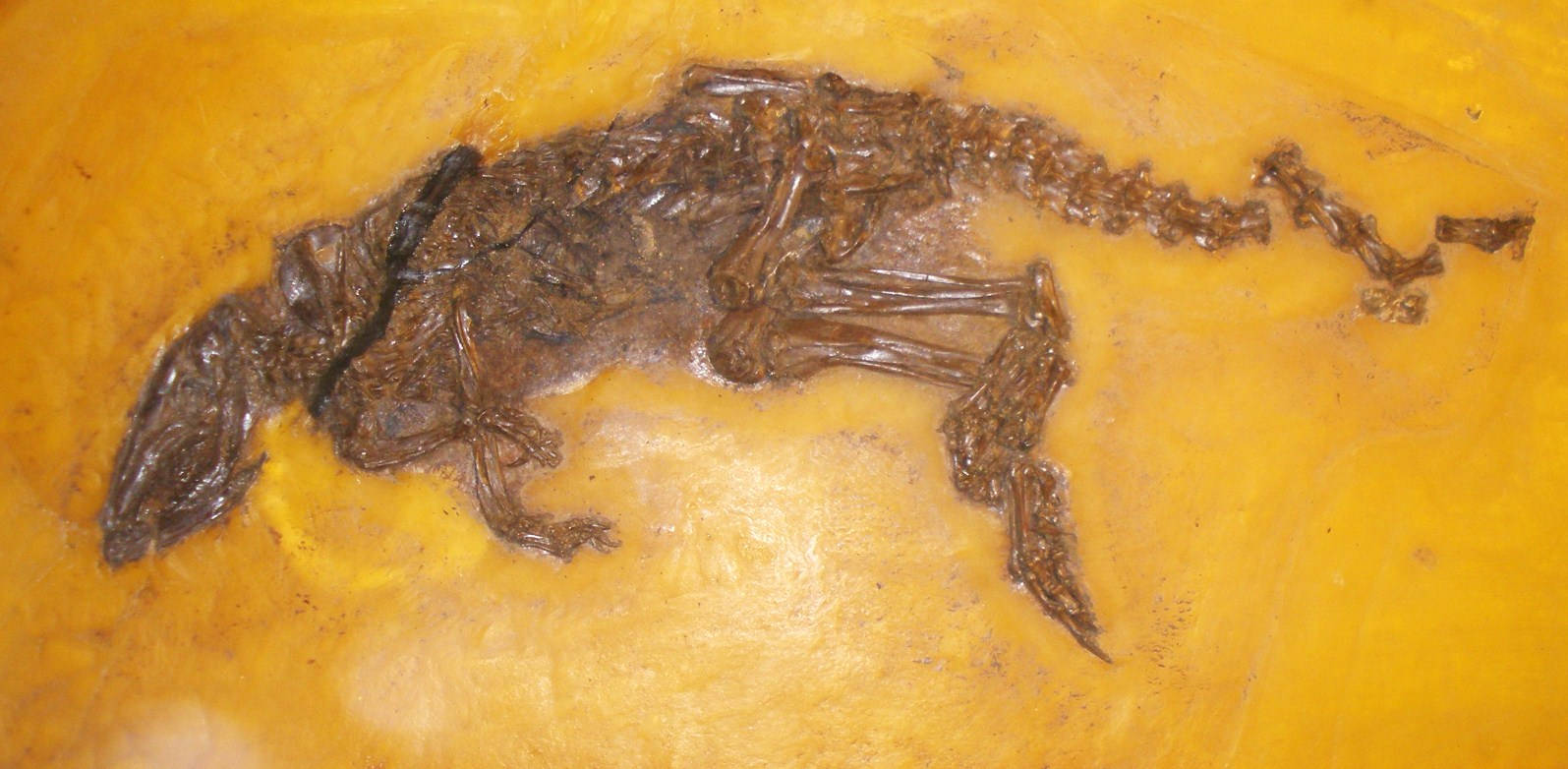
L. nasutum

Described by Adrian Lister and Gerhard Storch in 1985. It was a middle-sized species which was seventy-five centimeters long. Several skeletons have been found in the Messel pit, in Lower Lutetian strata. The tail of this species had 42-43 vertebrae, a number surpassed among mammals solely by the long-tailed pangolin. Its premolar and molar teeth were quite small in comparison to the dentition as a whole. The name of the species refers to the nose of the animal. The holotype is the complete skeleton of an adult specimen kept in the Forschungsinstitut Senckenberg in Frankfurt am Main.

=== Leptictidium sigei ===
Described by Christian Mathis in 1989. Fossils have been found in the lagerstätte at Sainte-Néboule, Baby, Sindou and Pécarel (France), and it has a more primitive appearance than L. nasutum. It is known mainly from isolated teeth. It has a P4 with a much reduced paraconid, as well as very distinct entoconids and hypoconulids on M1 and M2. The species is dedicated to Bernard Sigé, French paleontologist.

=== Leptictidium tobieni ===
Fossil of L. tobieni at the Hessisches Landesmuseum Darmstadt.

Described by Wighart von Koenigswald and Gerhard Storch in 1987. It was the largest species of all at ninety centimetres long. It is one of the species found in the Messel pit, in Lutetian strata. The species is dedicated to Heinz Tobien, descriptor of the genus Leptictidium and promoter of research in the Messel pit during the 1960s. The holotype is a complete and perfectly preserved skeleton of an adult specimen which was uncovered in September 1984 and which can be found at the Hessisches Landesmuseum Darmstadt. There is also a paratype; a non-complete and badly preserved specimen which can be found at the Institut Royal des Sciences Naturelles de Belgique.

It has a relatively robust mandible with a relatively large mesostyle. The molariform premolar teeth are a characteristic of the genus Leptictidium as a whole which is very marked in the P4 premolars of L. tobieni. The well-developed mesostyle and the transversal configuration of the upper molars are other typical traits of this species.

=== Comparison of the Messel species ===
By observing the clear morphological differences in the dentition of the three species found in Messel, the possibility can be discarded that either the discovered fossils are specimens of the same species but of different age, or that two of these forms belonged to the same species with a marked sexual dimorphism.

The Messel species developed very quickly a series of characteristic evolutionary traits, common to all of them, which separate them from the lagerstätte of Quercy.

This table compares the size of different specimens of each species found in the Messel pit (sizes in millimetres).

Messel species comparison
species	L. auderiense		L. nasutum			L. tobieni	
specimens	LNK Me 418a	SMF 78/1	SMF ME 1143	LNK Me 576	HLMD Me 8059	HLMD Me 8011a	I. R. Sc. N. B. M1475
Cranium	67.4	67.2	88.2	89.8	88.6	101.1	-
Head+torso	220	215	300	295	328	375	-
Tail	(340)	375	450	445	454	500	-
Humerus	31.8	32.3	41.9	41.9	43.1	45.7	46.6
Ulna	29.4	31.8	45.6	44.2	45.3	51.2	-
Radius	21.5	23.9	31.7	31.1	33.2	37.0	36.2
Pelvis	54.5	56.5	77.8	77.1	-	85.7	(82)
Femur	54.2	57.5	75.3	71.5	75.1	84.8	(82)
Tibia	64.4	66.3	79.7	79.0	80.1	91.6	90.5
Fibula	57.4	58.7	75.2	72.3	-	86.6	-
Calcaneus	22.3	22.6	25.3	25.2	-	26.7	25.4
Neurocranium †	33.0	31.6	38.7	39.3	37.5	42.2	42.5
Height of the lower jaw below M2	5.7	5.6	6.9	6.6	6.4	9.0	9.5
Height of the mandibular ramus ††	14.3	-	20.8	23.3	23.0	29.2	28.5

† From the front edge of the orbit.
†† Above the incisura praeangularis.

== Evolutionary tendencies ==
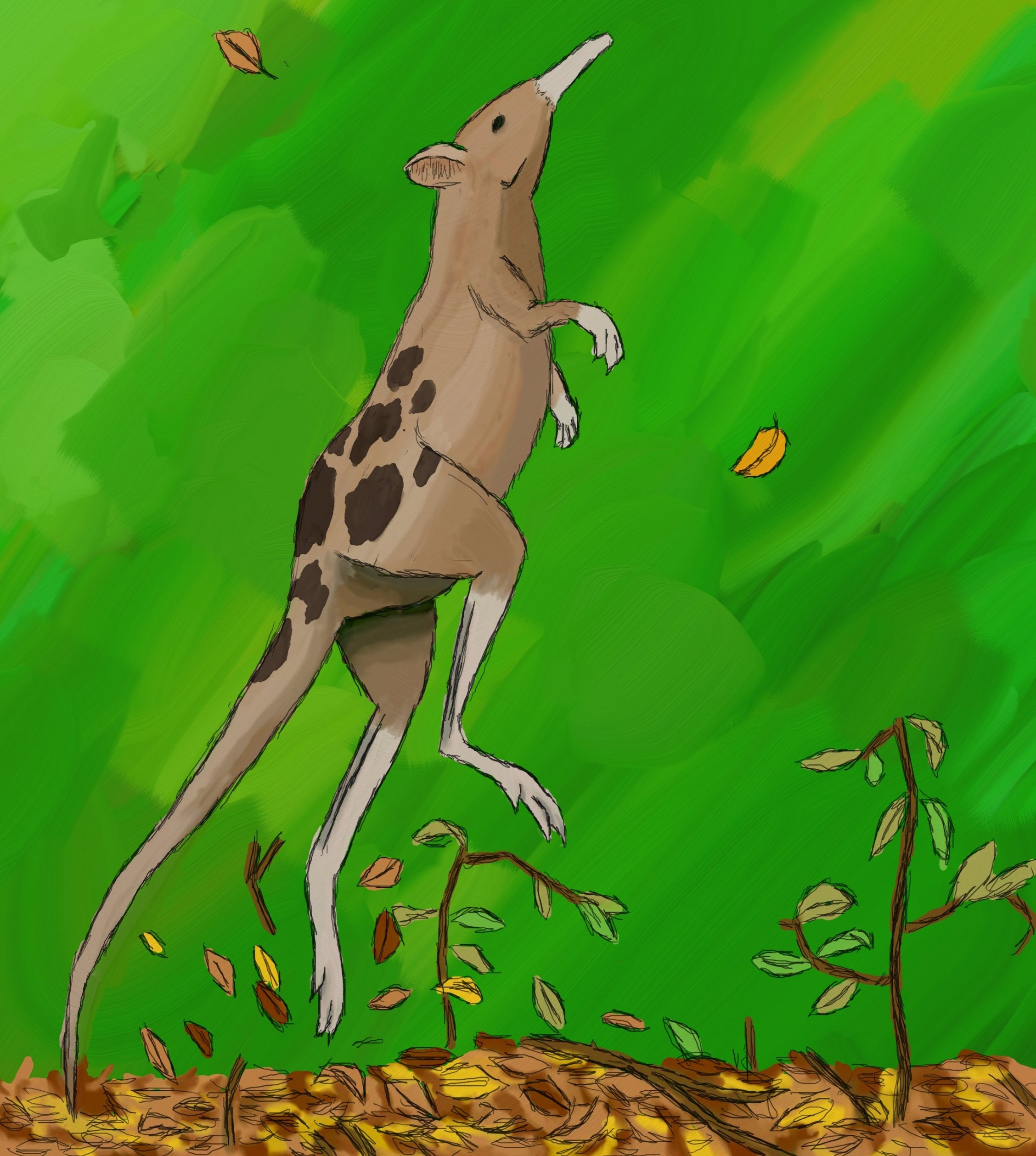
Restoration

In his work Quelques insectivores primitifs nouveaux de l'Eocène supérieur du sud de la France (1989), French paleontologist Christian Mathis studied the evolutionary tendencies of the genus Leptictidium, based on comparison of the most primitive and the most recent species. From his observations, Mathis remarks:

- an increase in size;
- a precocious merging of the hypoconulid and the entoconid on M3;
- a slight reduction of the width of the talonid on M3 in comparison to the anterior molars;
- the formation and development of a mesostile on the molariform jugal teeth P4-M3;
- the reduction of the parametastylar and metastylar regions of these same teeth (with some exceptions), in particular with a reduction of the parastylar lobe which rises less in the anterior part of M3 and possibly P4;
- a transverse shortening of the upper molarised teeth, which become more square;
- the development of accessory conuli on the preprotocrista and postprotocrista;
- the development of the postcingulum.

== Bibliography ==
=== In English ===
- Benton, M. (2000). Vertebrate Palaeontology. Oxford: Blackwell Publishers. ISBN 0-632-05614-2.
- Frey, E.; Herkner, B.; Schrenk, F.; Seiffert, C (1993). Reconstructing organismic constructions and the problem of Leptictidium's locomotion. Darmstadt: Kaupia Darmstädter Beiträge zur Naturgeschichte.
- Rose, K. (2006). The Beginning of the Age of Mammals. The Johns Hopkins University Press. ISBN 0-8018-8472-1.

=== In French ===
- Mathis, C. (1989). Quelques insectivores primitifs nouveaux de l'Eocène supérieur du sud de la France. Paris: Bulletin du Muséum national d'histoire naturelle.

=== In German ===
- Christian, A. (1999). Zur Biomechanik der Fortbewegung von Leptictidium (Mammalia, Proteutheria). Frankfurt am Main: Courier Forschungsinstitut Senckenberg.
- Maier, W.; Richter, G.; Storch, G. (1986). Leptictidium nasutum - ein archaisches Säugetier aus Messel mit außergewöhnlichen biologischen Anpassungen. Frankfurt am Main: Natur und Museum.
- Storch, G. (1987). Leptictidium - ein archaischer Säuger. Naturwissenschaftliche Rundschau.
- Storch, G.; Lister, A. (1985). Leptictidium nasutum - ein Pseudorhyncocyonide aus dem Eozän der Grube Messel bei Darmstadt (Mammalia, Proteutheria). Frankfurt del Main: Senckenbergiana lethaea.
- Tobien, H. (1962). Insectivoren (Mammalia) aus dem Mitteleozän (Lutetium) von Messel bei Darmstadt. Wiesbaden: Notizbl. hess. Landesamt. Bodenforsch.
- von Koenigswald; W.; Storch, G. (1987). Leptictidium tobieni n sp., ein dritter Pseudorhyncocyonide (Proteutheria, Mammalia) aus dem Eozän von Messel. Frankfurt del Main: Courier Forschungsinstitut Senckenberg.
- von Koenigswald, W.; Wuttke, M. (1987). Zur Taphonomie eines unvollständigen Skelettes von Leptictidium nasutum aus dem Ölschiefer von Messel. Wiesbaden: Geol. Jb. Hessen.
