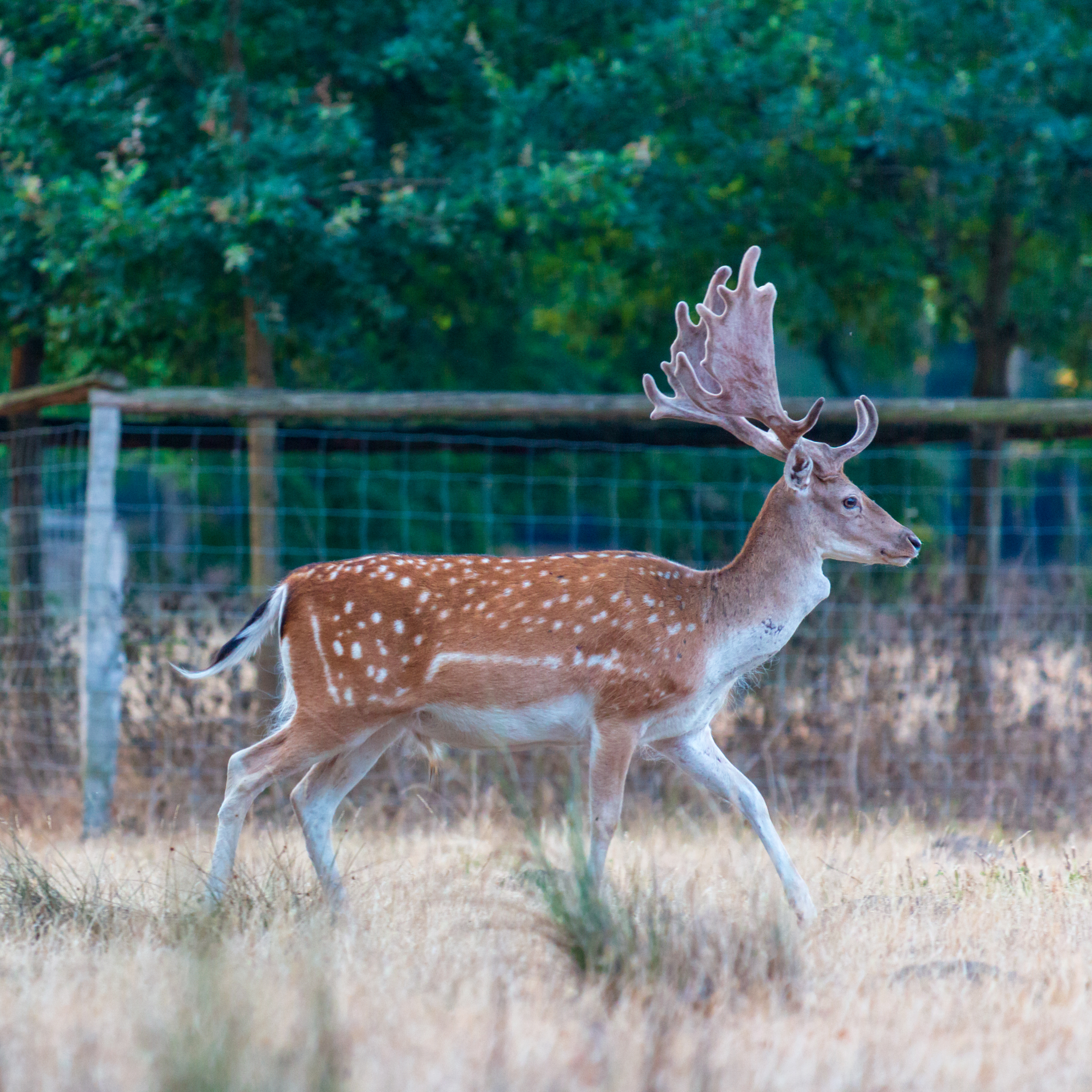
- European fallow deer (D. dama)

Scientific classification
- Kingdom: Animalia
- Phylum: Chordata
- Class: Mammalia
- Order: Artiodactyla
- Family: Cervidae
- Tribe: Cervini
- Genus: Dama; Frisch, 1775

Type species
- Cervus dama Linnaeus, 1758

Species
- Dama dama; Dama mesopotamica; †Dama clactoniana; For other extinct species, see text

Synonyms
- Dactyloceros Wagner, 1855; Machlis Kaup; Palmatus Lydekker, 1898; Platyceros Wagner, 1844; Platyceros Zimmermann, 1780

= Fallow deer =

Fallow deer Temporal range: Pleistocene–Recent

Genus of deer

Fallow deer is the common name for species of deer in the genus Dama of subfamily Cervinae. The two living species are the European fallow deer (Dama dama), native to Europe and Anatolia, and the Persian fallow deer (Dama mesopotamica), native to the Middle East. The European species has been widely introduced elsewhere.

== Name ==
The name fallow is derived from the deer's pale brown colour. The Latin word dāma or damma, used for roe deer, gazelles, and antelopes, lies at the root of the modern scientific name, as well as the German Damhirsch, French daim, Dutch damhert, and Italian daino. In Serbo-Croatian, the name for the fallow deer is jelen lopatar ("shovel deer"), due to the form of its antlers. The Modern Hebrew name of the fallow deer is yachmur (יחמור).

== Description ==
The Persian fallow deer is the larger of the two living species, with an average body mass around 70–140 kg (150–310 lb), and a shoulder height around 80–110 cm (31–43 in) with the European fallow deer having an average body mass around 35–80 kg (77–176 lb). The living fallow deer species have antlers that have flattened (palmate) ends, with the palmate section being somewhat narrower in the antlers of Persian fallow deer. The only other cervid to possess palmate antlers are moose; all others exhibit dendritic antlers.

During the summer, European fallow deer have a reddish pelt with white spots along the back and the sides (flank), while during the winter, they have a grey pelt that lacks or has less visible spots.

== Ecology ==
The diet of the European fallow deer has been described as highly flexible, able to adapt to local conditions. In Britain, it has been observed to primarily feed on grass in summer and acorns and other mast during the autumn and early winter, as well as on shrubs and trees.

=== Palaeoecology ===
Early Pleistocene fossils of Dama-like deer from Pirro Nord indicate that they were feeding on water stressed C_{3} plants based on their bioapatite δ^{13}C ratios.

== Taxonomy and evolution ==
The genus includes two extant species:

=== Extant species ===
Genus Dama – Frisch, 1775 – two species
Common name	Scientific name and subspecies	Range	Size and ecology	IUCN status and estimated population
European fallow deer	Dama dama (Linnaeus, 1758)	Confirmed native only to Turkey, but possibly native to the Italian Peninsula, the Balkans, and the island of Rhodes in Greece; introduced from Roman times onwards to the rest of Europe, and around the world in more recent times	Size: Habitat: Diet:	LC
Persian fallow deer	Dama mesopotamica (Brooke, 1875)	Iran and Israel; once ranged throughout the Middle East and eastern Turkey	Size: Habitat: Diet:	EN

Some taxonomists classify the Persian fallow deer as a subspecies (D. d. mesopotamica), while others, such as the IUCN, treat it as a separate species (D. mesopotamica). Based on genetic evidence, Dama is considered to be closest living relative of the extinct genus Megaloceros. The circumscription of the genus is uncertain, with some authors choosing to include taxa that are otherwise placed in the genus Pseudodama, which may be ancestral to Dama.

The earliest species of Dama appeared around the Pliocene-Pleistocene boundary about 2.6 million years ago, or around the beginning of the Middle Pleistocene approximately 0.8 million years ago, depending on the species included in the genus. The relationships of most Dama species to each other and to other fossil deer are controversial, with no overall consensus on their relationships, aside the close relationship of D. clactoniana with the living Dama species. The earliest Dama species lack palmate (broad and flattened) antlers, with this trait only developing in D. pelleponesica, D. clactoniana, and the two living species.

Extinct species, based on van der Made et al. 2023:

- Dama nestii known from the Early Pleistocene of Europe, also assigned to the genus Pseudodama.
- Dama vallonnetensis known from the Early Pleistocene of Europe, also assigned to Pseudodama.
- Dama farnetensis known from the Early Pleistocene of Europe, also assigned to Pseudodama.
- Dama pelleponesica known from the early Middle Pleistocene of Greece, with similar remains referred to as Dama aff. pelleponesica known from the late Middle Pleistocene of Azokh Cave in Azerbaijan. Species not universally recognised as valid.
- Dama roberti known from the early Middle Pleistocene of Europe.
- Dama celiae known from the Middle Pleistocene of Spain.
- Dama clactoniana known from the late Middle Pleistocene of Europe, thought to be the ancestor of the two living species.
- Dama pontica known from the Early Pleistocene of Crimea.

Relationships of Dama to other deer species based on mitochondrial DNA.

- Cervidae
  - - - Hydropotes (water deer)
      - Capreolus (roe deer)
    - - Alces (moose)
      - - Rangifer (reindeer/caribou)
        - - Odocoileini (brocket deer, mule deer, white tailed deer, etc)
  - - - Elaphodus (tufted deer)
      - Muntiacus (muntjacs)
    - Cervini
      - - Rucervus (Schomburgk's deer and barasingha)
        - Axis (chital, etc)
      - - - Dama (Fallow deer)
          - †Megaloceros giganteus (Irish elk)
        - - - Elaphurus (Père David's deer)
            - Panolia (Eld's deer)
          - - - Rusa alfredi (Visayan spotted deer)
              - Rusa marianna (Philippine deer)
            - - - Rusa timorensis (Javan rusa)
                - Rusa unicolor (Sambar deer)
              - Cervus (red deer, elk, sika deer)
