= Sorex bifidus =

Sorex bifidus Temporal range: Early Pleistocene

Scientific classification
- Domain: Eukaryota
- Kingdom: Animalia
- Phylum: Chordata
- Class: Mammalia
- Order: Eulipotyphla
- Family: Soricidae
- Genus: Sorex
- Species: †S. bifidus

Binomial name
- †Sorex bifidus Rzebik-Kowalska, 2013

Species of mammal (fossil)

Sorex bifidus is an extinct species of Sorex that lived during the Early Pleistocene.

== Distribution ==
Sorex bifidus is known from Żabia Cave in Poland.
