= Hydrictis gudho =

Hydrictis gudho Temporal range: Pleistocene

Scientific classification
- Domain: Eukaryota
- Kingdom: Animalia
- Phylum: Chordata
- Class: Mammalia
- Order: Carnivora
- Family: Mustelidae
- Genus: Hydrictis
- Species: †H. gudho

Binomial name
- †Hydrictis gudho Werdelin & Lewis, 2013

Extinct species of mammal

Hydrictis gudho is an extinct species of Hydrictis that lived in Kenya during the Pleistocene epoch.
