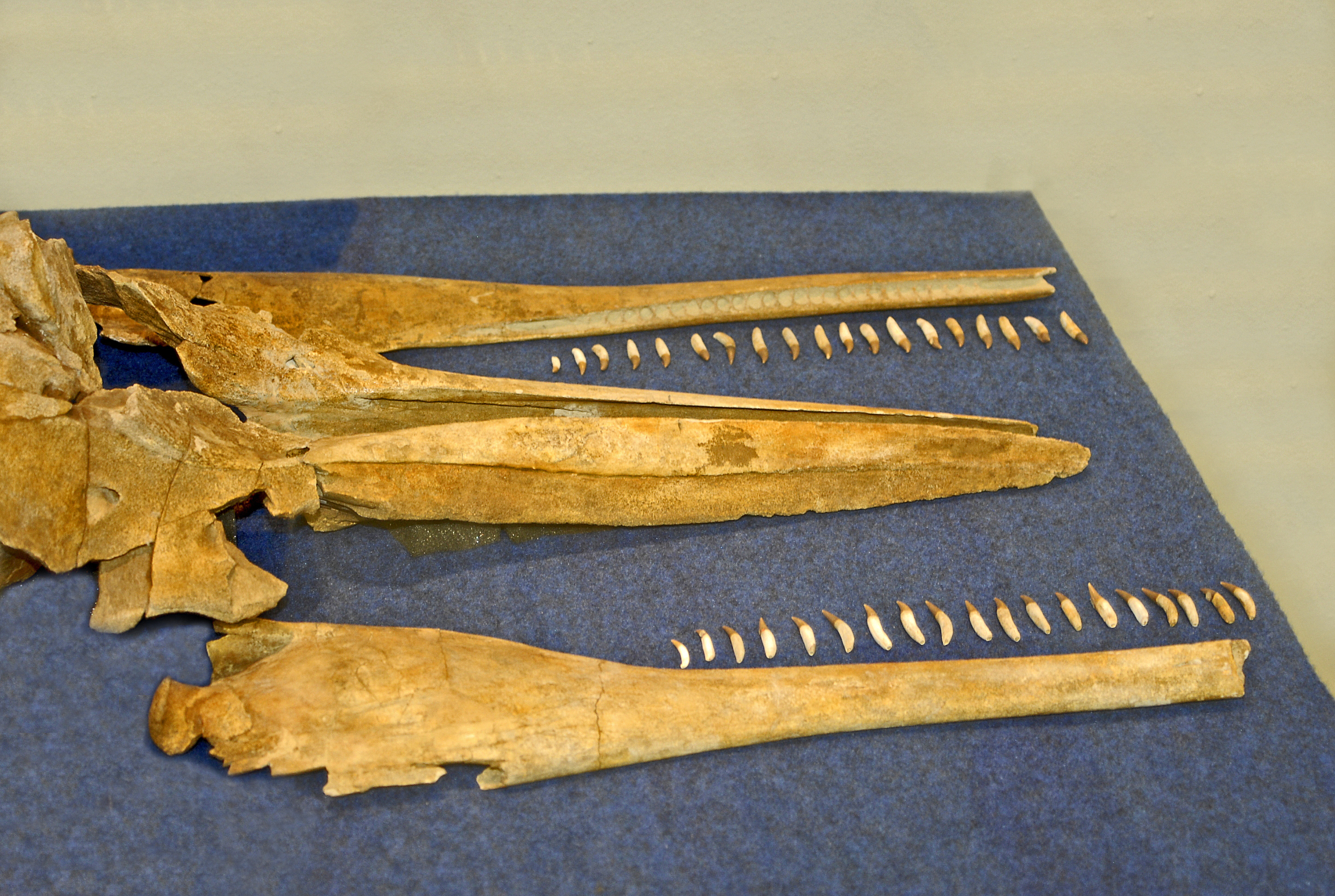
- Fossil skull of Septidelphis morii

Scientific classification
- Kingdom: Animalia
- Phylum: Chordata
- Class: Mammalia
- Order: Artiodactyla
- Infraorder: Cetacea
- Family: Delphinidae
- Genus: †Septidelphis; Bianucci, 2013
- Species: †S. morii

Binomial name
- †Septidelphis morii Bianucci, 2013

= Septidelphis =

Septidelphis Temporal range: Pliocene

Extinct genus of mammals

Septidelphis is an extinct genus of oceanic dolphins belonging to the family (Delphinidae). The type species is Septidelphis morii.

== Fossil records ==
This genus is known in the fossil records from the late Zanclean–early Piacenzian (Pliocene) (age range: from 3.81 to 3.19 million years ago). Fossils are found in the marine strata of Piedmont (northern Italy).

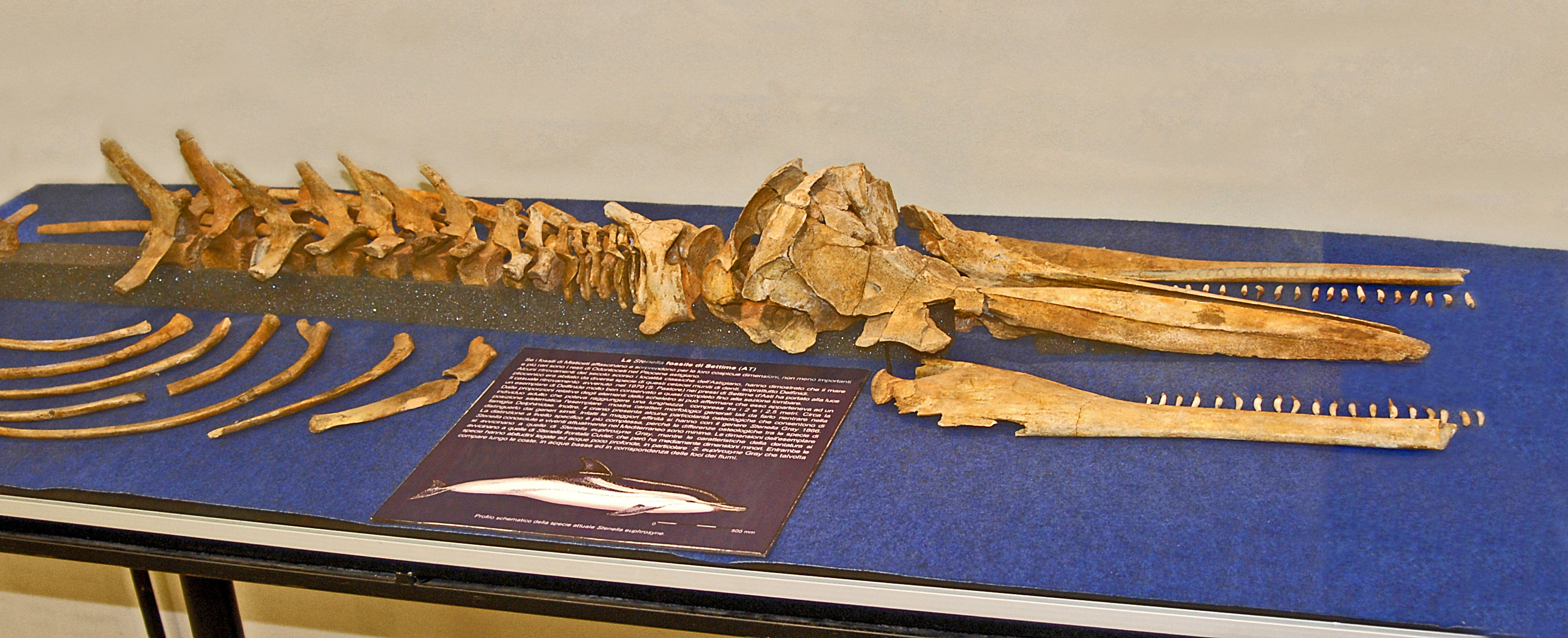
Fossil skeleton of Septidelphis morii

The holotype is currently housed and displayed in Asti's Paleontological Museum.

== Description ==
This genus is characterized by a condylobasal length reaching about 550 millimetres (22 in), by a long and narrow rostrum and by a wide premaxilla at the middle of rostrum. It shows an extreme posterior widening of the dorsal opening of the mesorostral canal.
