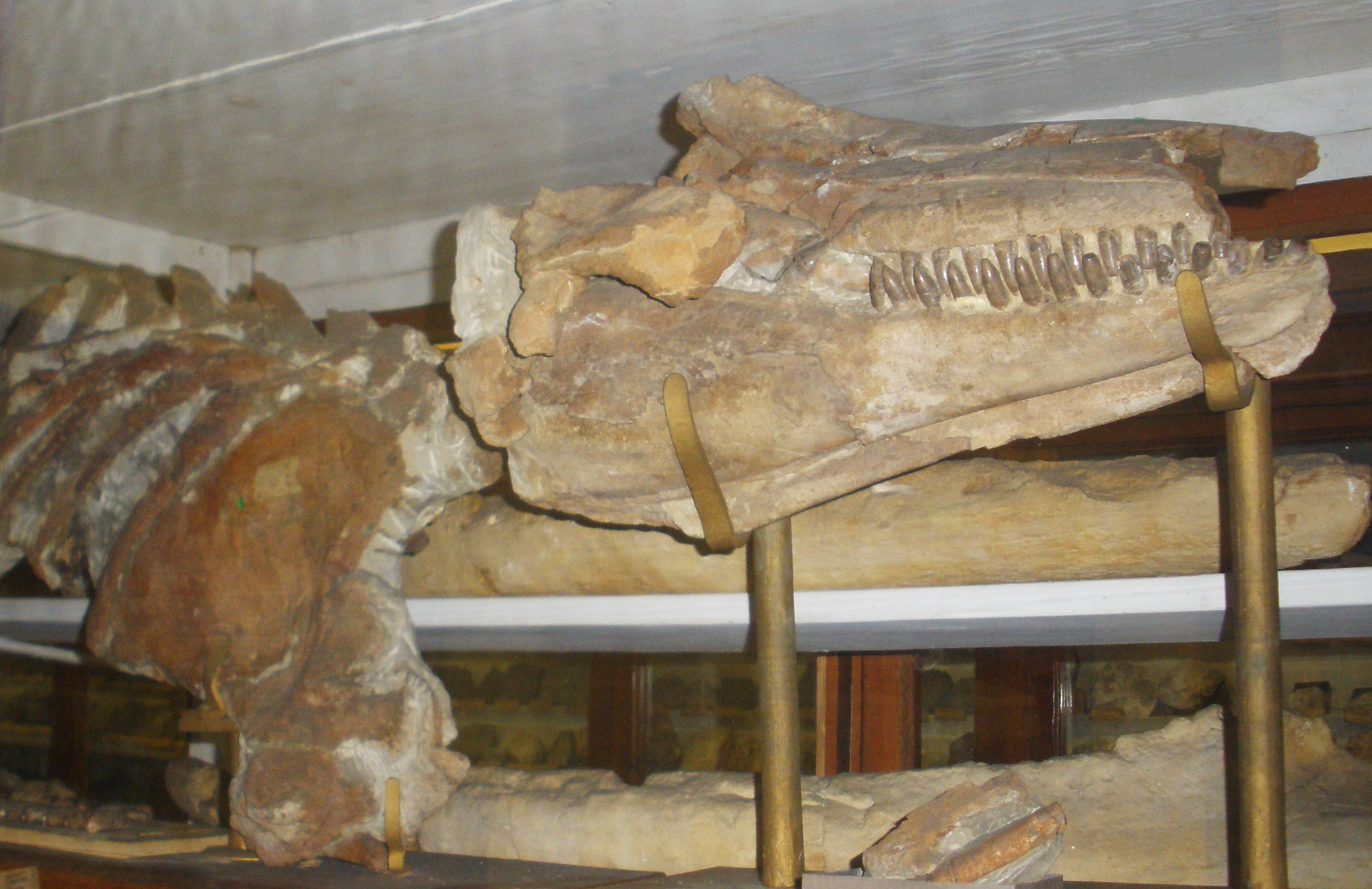
- Skeleton at the Museo Capellini di Bologna

Scientific classification
- Kingdom: Animalia
- Phylum: Chordata
- Class: Mammalia
- Order: Artiodactyla
- Infraorder: Cetacea
- Family: Delphinidae
- Genus: Orcinus
- Species: †O. citoniensis

Binomial name
- †Orcinus citoniensis Capellini, 1883

Synonyms
- Orca citoniensis Capellini, 1883; Orca citoniensies Capellini, 1883; Orca cylindrica Matsumoto, 1937

= Orcinus citoniensis =

Orcinus citoniensis Temporal range: Late Pliocene-Early Pleistocene 3.5–2.5 Ma

Extinct species of killer whale

Orcinus citoniensis is an extinct species of cetacean, related to the orca, identified in the Late Pliocene of Italy and the Early Pleistocene of England. It was smaller than the modern killer whale (O. orca), 4 m (13 ft) versus 7 to 10 m (23 to 33 ft), and had around 8 more teeth in its jaw. It may have resembled the modern killer whale in appearance, and could represent a transitional species between the modern killer whale and other dolphins. O. citoniensis could have hunted fish and squid in pods, and coexisted with other large predators of the time such as the orcinine Hemisyntrachelus and the extinct shark Otodus megalodon.

== Taxonomy ==
The holotype specimen, MB-1COC-11.17.18, an incomplete skeleton, was first described by paleontologist Giovanni Capellini as Orca citoniensis in 1883 which came from the Late Pliocene sediments of the Poltriciano farm outside the town of Cetona in Tuscany, Italy–to which the species name "citoniensis" refers to. Capellini also referred to the whale as "O. citoniensies". A specimen consisting of a tooth and a right inner ear periotic bone from the English Red Crag Formation of the Crag Group, dating to the Early Pleistocene, was referred by English geologist Richard Lydekker in 1887, who noted that these bones were similar to but considerably smaller than those of the modern killer whale (O. orca). In 1904, French zoologist Édouard Louis Trouessart replaced Orca with Orcinus and described the whale as Orcinus citoniensis. In 1937, Japanese paleontologist Hikoshichiro Matsumoto referred to Lydekker's finds as "Orca cylindrica". In 1988, Italian paleontologist Georg Pilleri assigned isolated Middle Miocene teeth, specimen MGPT-PU13981, from Savoy, France to the species, but this was later revised in 1996 by Italian paleontologist Giovanni Bianucci because the back of the tooth root was too large; also, the specimen actually dates to the Pliocene. Bianucci further identified a beak fragment showing tooth sockets, also from the Late Pliocene of Tuscany, which may belong to the species.

O. citoniensis may represent a transitional species between early dolphins and the modern killer whale. Matsumoto, while describing the Middle Pleistocene Japanese O. paleorca in 1937, noted that the teeth of O. paleorca are much larger and have more similar dimensions to the modern killer whale than those of O. citoniensis.

== Description ==
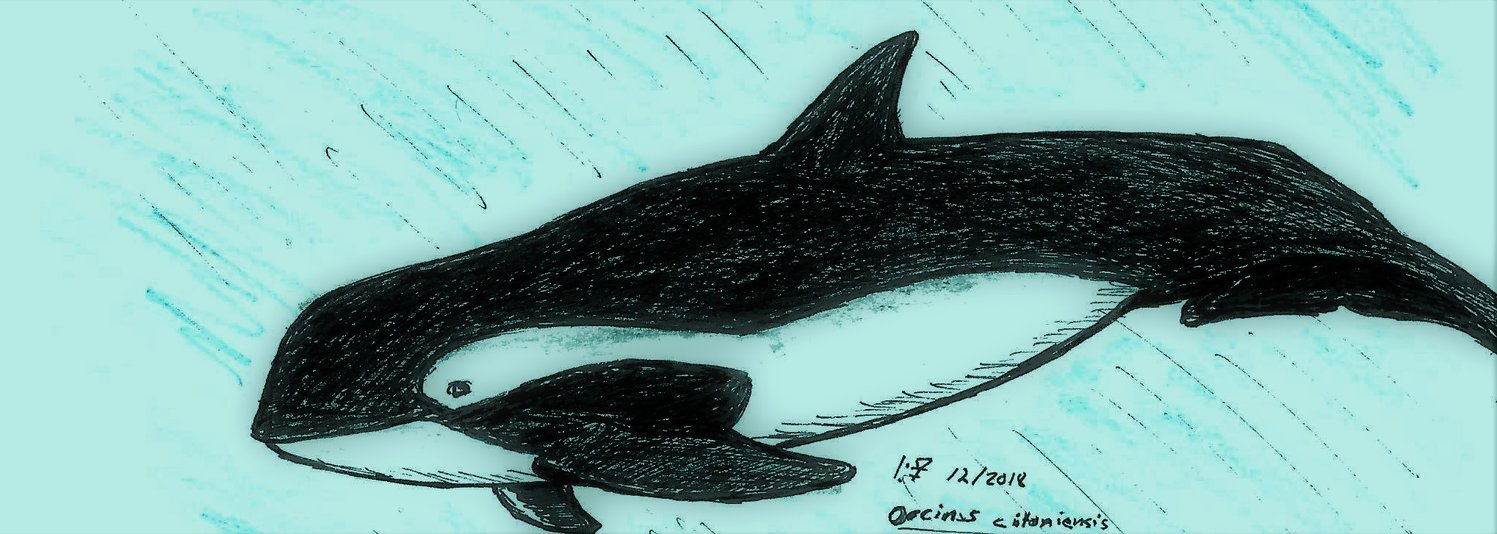
A restoration of Orcinus citoniensis

The holotype comprises the right ramus of the jawbone, teeth in the right jaw, detached teeth, a vertebral column lacking the first three neck vertebrae and last tail vertebrae, some ribs, the breastbone, the right shoulder blade, and humerus and metacarpal fragments from the fin. The skull measures around 60 cm (24 in), in contrast to the 65 to 110 cm (26 to 43 in) skull of the modern killer whale. Like the modern killer whale, the snout is broad and relatively short, and the eye socket is relatively small. It had 28 conical teeth in either jaw, unlike the modern killer whale which has, on average, 24.

The holotype could have been 4 m (13 ft) long, in contrast to the 7 to 10 m (23 to 33 ft) modern killer whale. The vertebrae are large, with 11 thoracic vertebrae, and 51 vertebrae in total, comparable to the numbers in the modern killer whale. The acromion on the shoulder blade, which forms part of the shoulder joint, is short and broad as it is in the ancient bottlenose dolphin Tursiops capellinii. It may have had the appearance of a small killer whale.

== Paleobiology ==
The modern killer whale (Orcinus orca)

Like the modern killer whale as well as many other living dolphins, O. citoniensis could have hunted in cooperative pods. Concerning diet, it may have been more similar to the modern false killer whale (Pseudorca crassidens) and pygmy killer whale (Feresa attenuata), mesopredators of squid and large fish, but given the comparative gracility of the teeth, it may have only been capable of catching small- to medium-sized fish (though it was still probably capable of biting and tearing into larger prey).

== Paleoecology ==
The Pliocene of Tuscany is representative of a nutrient-rich upwelling in coastal waters and the upper midnight zone along a continental slope. The Pliocene of Italy featured a wide array of marine mammals, for example dolphins such as Etruridelphis, the small sperm whale Kogia pusilla, beaked whales such as Tusciziphius, baleen whales such as Eschrichtioides, the dugong Metaxytherium subapenninum, and the monk seal Pliophoca. It also featured several sharks. The top predators were the orcinine Hemisyntrachelus and the extinct shark Megalodon. The area has one of the most diverse Pliocene decapod crustacean assemblages, which indicates a sandy-muddy and at places hard-rock seafloor with calm, well-oxygenated, nearshore water, settings which are conducive to decapod life. Seagrasses may have been common, similar to the modern day meadows of neptune grass (Posidonia oceanica) that occur in the region.

The Red Crag Formation is representative of a temperate, shallow nearshore environment, perhaps at the mouth of a large river indicated by conifer pollen and small terrestrial vertebrate remains. Lydekker, along with O. citoniensis, identified several other whales from the formation, for example the dubious baleen whale Balaenoptera sibbaldina, the sperm whale Hoplocetus, the shark toothed dolphin Squalodon antverpiensis, as well as some species that exist in modern day such as the northern bottlenose whale (Hyperoodon ampullatus), the strap-toothed whale (Mesoplodon layardii), and the long-finned pilot whale (Globicephala melas). Shark teeth and skate coprolite were also found here.

== See also ==
- Orcinus paleorca
- Orcinus meyeri
- Livyatan
