= Orcininae =

Scientific classification
- Kingdom: Animalia
- Phylum: Chordata
- Class: Mammalia
- Order: Artiodactyla
- Infraorder: Cetacea
- Family: Delphinidae
- Subfamily: Orcininae

Subfamily of mammals

Orcininae is a contested subfamily of oceanic dolphins composed of 1 living and 3 extinct genera. It may be superseded by Delphinidae. Its only extant member is the orca (Orcinus orca); all other extant genera formerly classified in it have been moved out.

The Atlantic white-sided dolphin (Leucopleurus acutus) is sister to all other members of the Delphinidae; within that clade, the Orcininae are sister to all remaining lineages.

== Classification ==
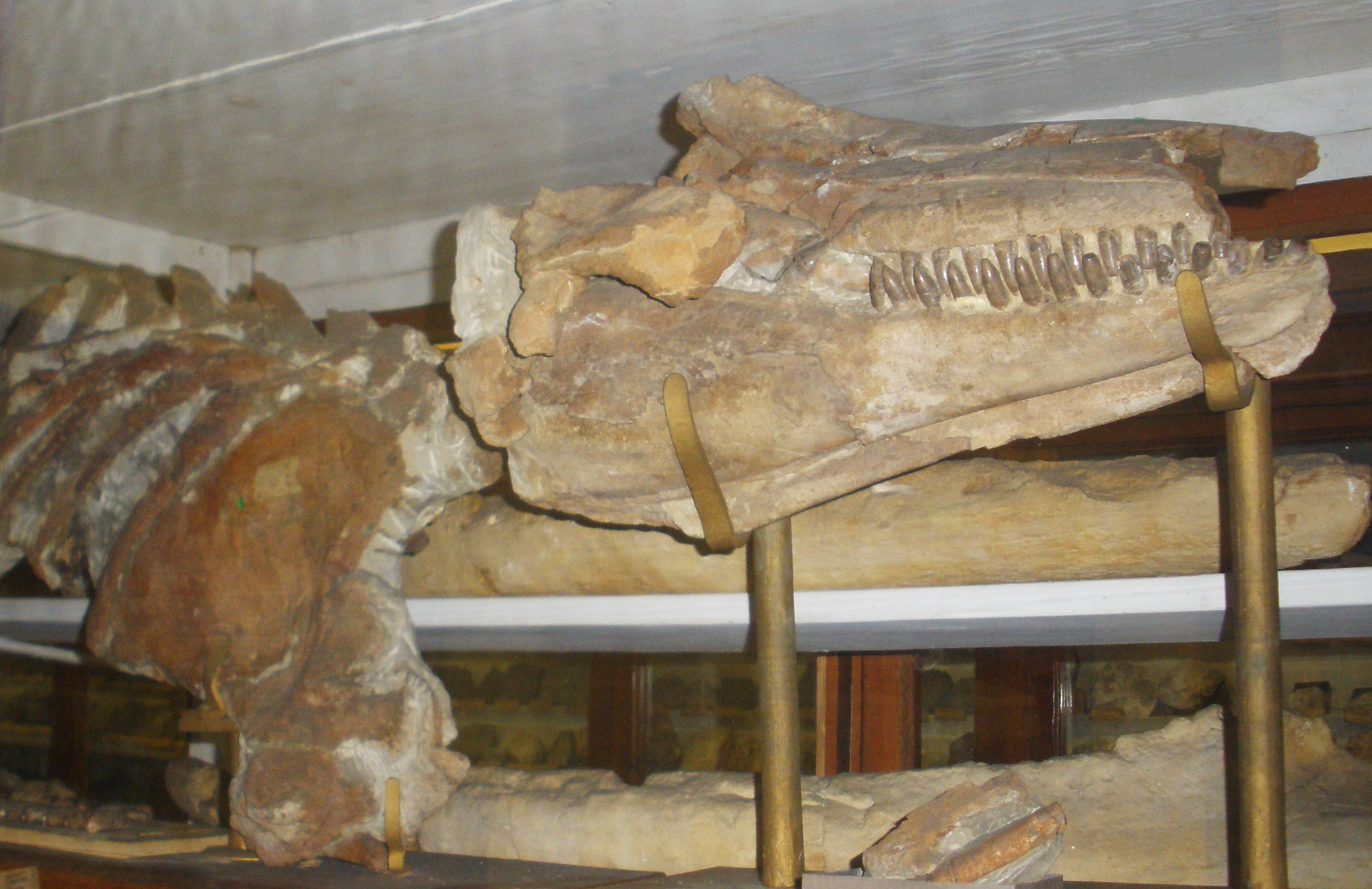
Orcinus citoniensis

- Arimidelphis †
  - Arimidelphis sorbinii †
- Hemisyntrachelus †
  - Hemisyntrachelus cortesii
  - Hemisyntrachelus pisanus
- Orcinus
  - Orcinus citoniensis †
  - Orcinus meyeri †
  - Orcinus orca
  - Orcinus paleorca †
- Platalearostrum †
  - Platalearostrum hoekmani †
