= Pseudorca yuanliensis =

Scientific classification
- Kingdom: Animalia
- Phylum: Chordata
- Class: Mammalia
- Infraclass: Placentalia
- Order: Artiodactyla
- Infraorder: Cetacea
- Family: Delphinidae
- Genus: Pseudorca
- Species: P. yuanliensis

Binomial name
- Pseudorca yuanliensis Chang & Cheng, 1998

Fossil cetacean species

Pseudorca yuanliensis is an extinct species in the genus Pseudorca, in the family Delphinidae. Like the other extinct species Pseudorca yokoyamai, Pseudorca yuanliensis is of Asian origin. Pseudorca yuanliensis was first found in Pilocene strata in Yunali, Taiwan.The Taiwanese team discovered fossil remains of the extinct animal, including a nearly intact skull, thoracic vertebrae, and ribs. The species was first described by Chang and Cheng in 1998.

== Fossils ==
There are a surprisingly good amount of fossils of Pseudorca yuanliensis. Four vertebrae in good shape have been found in Mianoli county, Taiwan. The fossil is estimated to be from the Quaternary Pleistocene. It was found in the Toukeshan Formation of West Taiwan. Furthermore, rib and skull fossils were found in the Yunali county in Taiwan.

== Similarities to Globicephala macrorhynchus ==
The researchers noted that Pseudorca yuanliensis bears no major difference to Globicephala macrorhynchus, and that any minor differences were obtained post-mortem. Based on a paper by Hikoshichiro Matsumoto, named "On the Fossil Cetaceans of Japan", it is thought that Pseudorca yuanliensis's sister species Pseudorca yokoyamai represents an intermediary phase between the pilot whale (the Globicephala genus of which Globicephala macrorhynchus is a part) and modern false killer whales. It is possible that Pseudorca yuanliensis, which was more similar to Globicephala than even Pseudorca yokoyamai, represents an even earlier intermediary phase between Globicepha and Pseudorca.

== Name ==
Cheng-Hsiu Tsai1, R. Ewan Fordyce, Chun-Hsiang Chang, and Liang-Kong Lin have suggested the name "Pseudorca yuanliensis" is a nomen nudum.
