= Orcinus =

Orcinus Temporal range: Early Miocene–Present

Scientific classification
- Kingdom: Animalia
- Phylum: Chordata
- Class: Mammalia
- Order: Artiodactyla
- Infraorder: Cetacea
- Family: Delphinidae
- Subfamily: Orcininae
- Genus: Orcinus; Fitzinger, 1860

Type species
- Delphinus orca Linnaeus, 1758

Species
- †Orcinus paleorca; †Orcinus citoniensis; †Orcinus meyeri; Orcinus orca

Synonyms
- Gladiator Gray, 1870; Ophesia Gray, 1868; Ophysia Gray, 1868; Orca Gray, 1846; Phocaena Gray, 1846; Grampus Iredale & Troughton (not Gray), 1933

Genus of oceanic mammals

Orcinus (/ɔːrˈsaɪnəs/) is a genus of Delphinidae (dolphins), in the infraorder Cetacea. It includes the largest delphinoid species, Orcinus orca, known as the orca or killer whale. Two extinct species are recognized, Orcinus paleorca and O. citoniensis, known from fossils. The other extinct species O. meyeri is disputed.

== Taxonomy ==
The genus Orcinus was published by Leopold Fitzinger in 1860, its type species is the orca named by Linnaeus in 1758 as Delphinus orca. Taxonomic arrangements of delphinids published by workers before and after Fitzinger, such as John Edward Gray as Orca in 1846 and Orca (Gladiator) in 1870, are recognized as synonyms of Orcinus. The descriptions of species as Orcinus glacialis Berzin and Vladimirov, 1983 and Orcinus nanus Mikhalev and Ivashin, 1981 are considered synonyms of Orcinus orca, the existing species of orca.

International Code of Zoological Nomenclature mentions that the name "orca" originates from Latin word orca, which means a large-bellied pot, and Orcinus is a derived word formed by adding a masculine suffix to it. This comes from Latin orca used by Ancient Romans for these animals, possibly borrowing Ancient Greek ὄρυξ (óryx) which referred (among other things) to a whale species, perhaps a narwhal. As part of the family Delphinidae, the species is more closely related to other oceanic dolphins than to other whales.

The published names for the genus and their relationship to other delphinids combined epithets such as orca, grampus, gladiator and orcinus throughout the nineteenth century. The instability of this uncertain synonymy was complicated by the repetition of mistakes, a lack of specimens and contradictory descriptions, especially by J. E. Gray. The beaching of whales in Eastern Australia (a female and male Grampus griseus) prompted a taxonomic revision in 1933, the authors Tom Iredale and Ellis Troughton proposed that the extensive use of "Grampus" be conserved as the generic name of orca (Orcinus orca) and that a new genus named Grampidelphis be established for Rissos dolphin (Grampus); the general stability of current species names emerged after the publication of the Philip Hershkovitz's Catalog of Living Whales (US National Museum, 1966).

The type of the genus is Delphinus orca, published by Linnaeus in the 10th edition of Systema Naturae. The type locality was named as "Oceano Europaeo".

== Description ==
A genus of carnivorous marine mammals, cetaceans of the delphinid family, with teeth in the upper and lower jaws. They possess a large brain which is informed by sophisticated auditory and echolocation techniques. The existing population, known as orca or killer whale, are a well known apex predator readily distinguished by their great size, 7 to 10 metres long, and mostly black and white coloring. These are highly intelligent and gregarious animals, able to communicate, educate, and cooperate in hunting the largest marine animals. The ecotypes within this species complex may coexist in a region, with resident and transient pods being sympatric, but these are known to be genetically isolated. Distinctions within the living Orcinus population are often observed in unique social behaviours, their cultures, which provided a significant evolutionary advantage in moving from a diet of cephlapods and fish to other mammals.

The fossil remains of Orcinus species are frequently teeth, deposited during the Pliocene, especially in Italy. Orcinus citoniensis is known by a well preserved skull and jaw. This specimen was an animal smaller than the orca, around 4 metres in length, and possessed a greater number of proportionally smaller teeth, specialized to hunt small prey such as small fishes and cephalopods.

The diet of modern orca is wide-ranging at the species level, although many ecotypes are specialists at the population level, some relying entirely on small prey such as fishes (in some cases on a single species) and others specialized for hunting marine mammals. Most delphinids feed on small fishes and cephalopods and earlier Orcinus species were much more specialized to take advantage of these resources, with macrophagous behavior only coming about in the Pleistocene at the same time as larger body sizes.

== Distribution ==
Fossil evidence of Orcinus species occur in a temporal range of 3.6 million years ago until the present day. The most ancient species Orcinus meyeri refers to fossils of a partial jaw and teeth located at the early Miocene horizon of a site near Stockach in Germany.

== Classification ==
The classification of Orcinus within subfamilies of delphinids may be summarised as:

- Delphinidae
  - Delphininae
  - Lissodelphininae
  - Globicephalinae
  - Orcininae
    - Orcinus
      - Orcinus citoniensis Capellini, 1883.
      - Orcinus meyeri J. F. Brandt, 1873.
      - Orcinus orca = Delphinus orca Linnaeus, 1758. The existing population, a complex predicted to include cryptic species and subspecies
      - Orcinus paleorca H. Matsumoto, 1937.
  - Subfamily incertae sedis (Lagenorhynchus albirostris, Lagenorhynchus acutus)

The extant population is considered as a single species, although previously recognised diversity of orca populations suggests a number of cryptic species and subspecies may be recognised.

Other members of Orcininae were moved to Globicephalinae, and the relation of Orcinus with other dolphins is unknown.

Delphinidae

- Delphinidae
  - - - Globicephalinae
        - Grampus griseus – Risso's dolphin
        - - - - Globicephala – pilot whale species
              - - Feresa attenuata – pygmy killer whale
                - Peponocephala electra – melon-headed whale
            - Pseudorca crassidens – false killer whale
      - Orcaella – snubfin dolphin species
    - Orcinus
  - other dolphins

Orcinus and Globicephalinae
