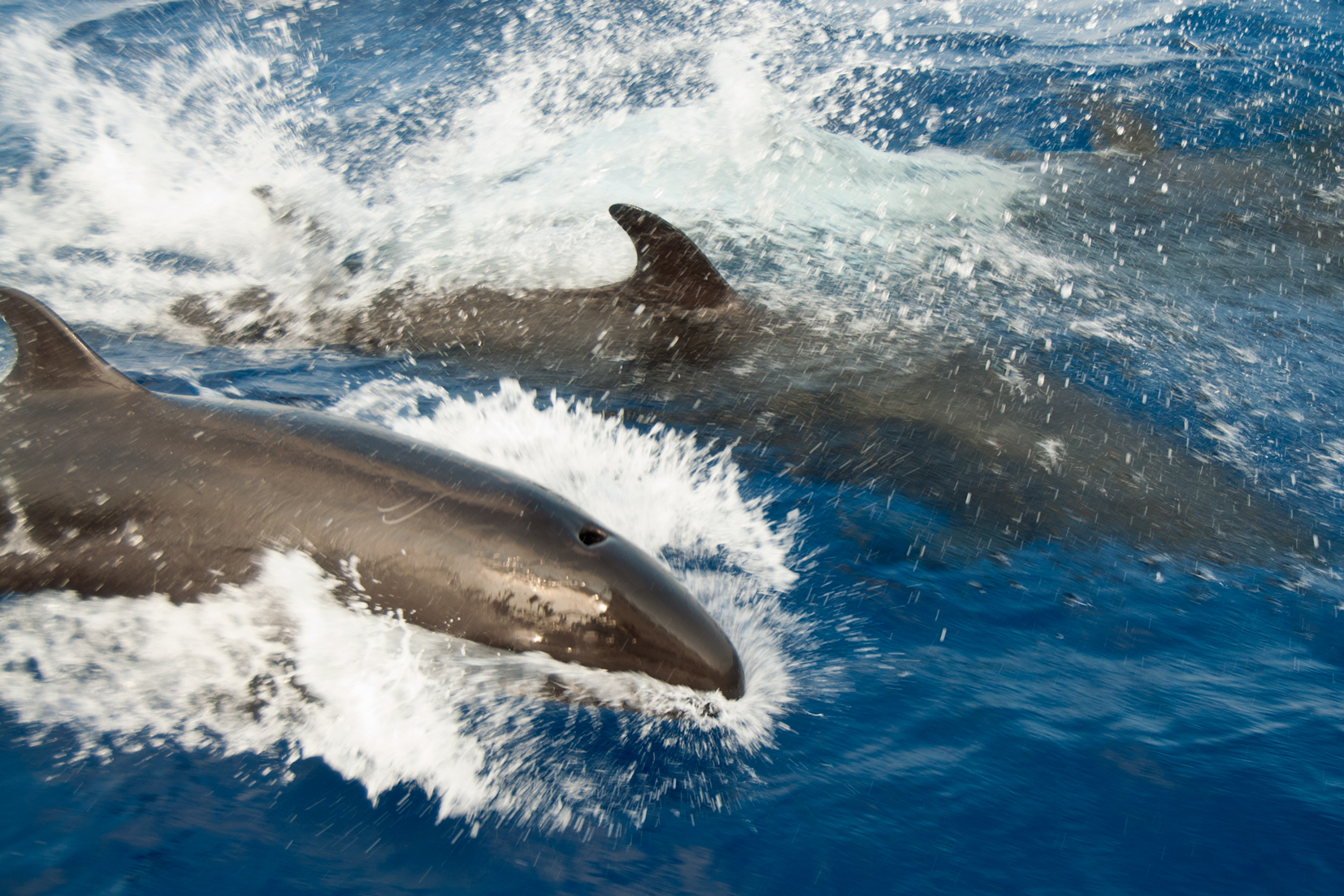
- Pseudorca crassidens, or the false killer whale, the only extant member.

Scientific classification
- Domain: Eukaryota
- Kingdom: Animalia
- Phylum: Chordata
- Class: Mammalia
- Order: Artiodactyla
- Infraorder: Cetacea
- Family: Delphinidae
- Subfamily: Globicephalinae
- Genus: Pseudorca; Reinhardt, 1862

Species
- Pseudorca crassidens; †Pseudorca yokoyamai; †Pseudorca yuanliensis

= Pseudorca =

Pseudorca Temporal range: Pliocene-recent

Genus of marine mammals

Pseudorca is a genus of cetaceans with three members which include Pseudorca yokoyamai, Pseudorca yuanliensis and Pseudorca crassidens, of which P. crassidens (commonly known as the false killer whale) is the only extant member.

Pseudorca yuanliensis is found in Pliocene layers in Yuanli, Taiwan, while Pseudorca yokoyamai is found in both Pliocene and Pleistocene rocks in Japan.
