= Eodelphinus =

Eodelphinus Temporal range: Miocene

Scientific classification
- Kingdom: Animalia
- Phylum: Chordata
- Class: Mammalia
- Order: Artiodactyla
- Infraorder: Cetacea
- Family: Delphinidae
- Genus: †Eodelphinus; Murakami, Shimada, Hikida, and Soeda, 2014

Extinct genus of dolphins

Eodelphinus is an extinct genus of oceanic dolphins belonging to the family Delphinidae.

== Description ==
Eodelphinus differs from all other delphinids by having a medially positioned premaxillary foramen, a partially transversely directed suture line between the palatine and pterygoid on the palate, and prominently long and ventrolaterally extended posterior process of the periotic with the attenuating posterior bullar facet. It possesses a wide ascending process of the left premaxilla relative to the right premaxilla at level of the middle of the external nares as in the killer whale and Hemisyntrachelus.

== Taxonomy ==
Eodelphinus was originally described in 1977 as a new species of Stenella, S. kabatensis, from a partial skull found in marine deposits in Hokkaido, Japan. Later, Ichisima (2005) questioned the attribution of S. kabatensis to Stenella, stressing the need for re-assessment of the taxon. Subsequent study by Mizuki Murakami and colleagues published in 2014 showed that S. kabatensis is the most basal member of Delphinidae, necessitating erection of the new genus Eodelphis. However, the genus name was changed to Eodelphinus because Eodelphis was already used for a fossil opossum.
