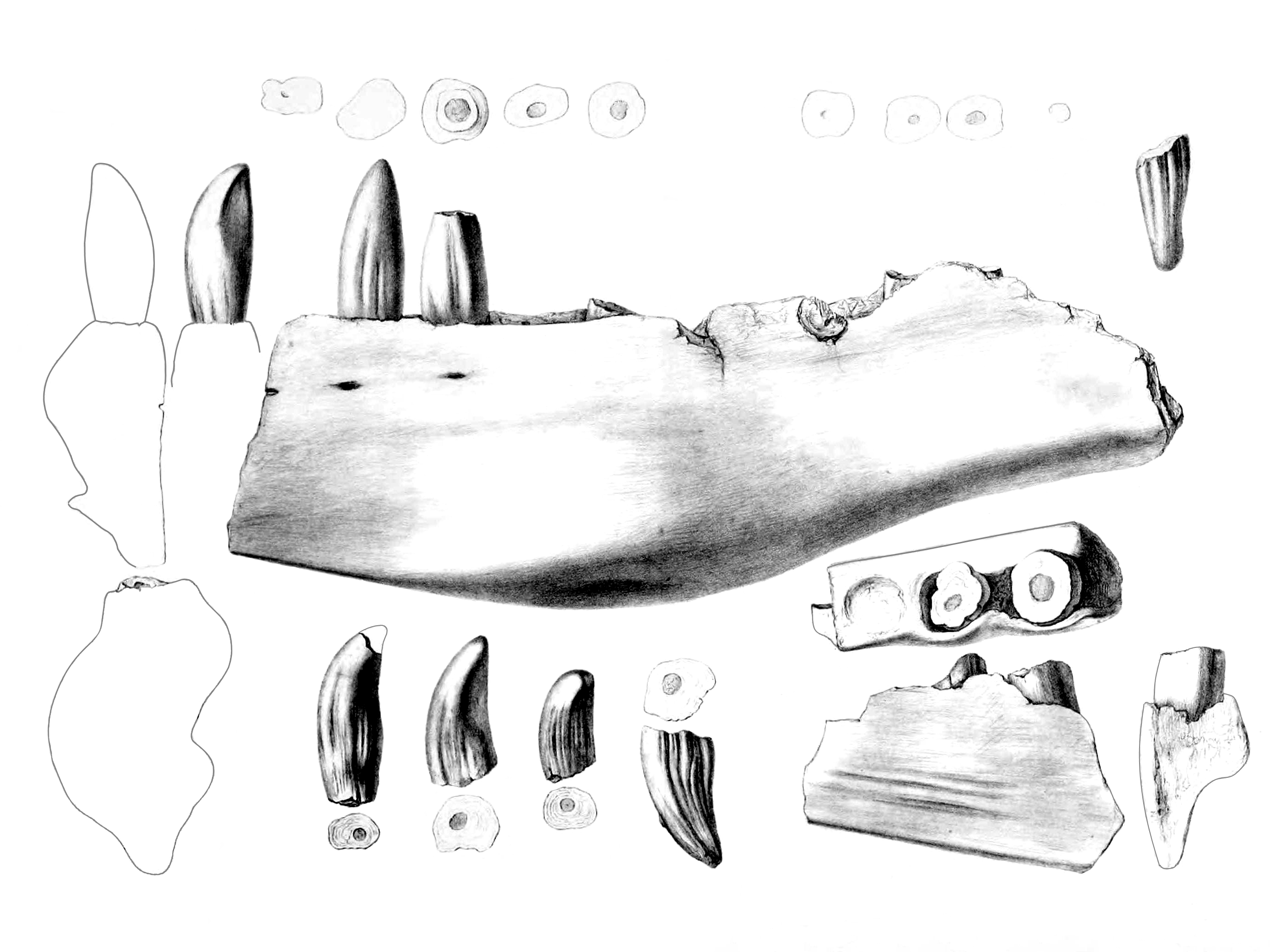
- The holotype and only specimen

Scientific classification
- Kingdom: Animalia
- Phylum: Chordata
- Class: Mammalia
- Order: Artiodactyla
- Infraorder: Cetacea
- Family: Delphinidae
- Genus: Orcinus
- Species: †O. meyeri

Binomial name
- †Orcinus meyeri (Brandt, 1873)

Synonyms
- Delphinus acutidens (von Meyer, 1859); Delphinus (Beluga) acutidens (von Meyer, 1859); Delphinus (Orcopsis) acutidens (von Meyer, 1859); Orca meyeri Brandt, 1873; ?Physeterula dubusi (van Beneden, 1877)

= Orcinus meyeri =

Orcinus meyeri Temporal range: Early Miocene

Extinct species of whale

Orcinus meyeri is an extinct species of Orcinus (killer whales) found in Early Miocene deposits of southern Germany, known from two jaw fragments and 18 isolated teeth. It was originally described as Delphinus acutidens in 1859, but it was reclassified in 1873. Its validity is disputed, and it may be synonymous with the ancient sperm whale Physeterula dubusi. It was found in the Alpine town of Stockach in the Molasse basin, which was a coastal area with strong tidal currents.

== Taxonomy ==
The remains of Orcinus meyeri was first described in 1859 by German paleontologist Christian Erich Hermann von Meyer as an ancient common dolphin, Delphinus acutidens, based on two jaw fragments and some isolated teeth found near the south German town of Stockach. He also suggested the names Delphinus (Beluga) acutidens and D. (Orcopsis) acutidens. The species name acutidens derives from Latin acutus "sharp" and dens "teeth". In 1873, German naturalist Johann Friedrich von Brandt gave it the species name meyeri, citing "acutidens" as being inaccurate given the apparent bluntness of the teeth, and placed it into the same genus as the killer whale (Orcinus orca), which at the time was Orca, given the similarity of the teeth, reclassifying the whale as Orca meyeri. The remains were then kept in the Stuttgart Museum of Natural History. In 1898, Swiss marine biologist Théophile Rudolphe Studer said O. meyeri was a subjective synonym of Delphinus acutidens, and there is room for debate on the question of the former's validity. In 1904, French zoologist Édouard Louis Trouessart replaced Orca with Orcinus and described the whale as Orcinus meyeri. In 1905, Austrian paleobiologist Othenio Abel considered D. acutidens to be synonymous with the sperm whale Physeterula dubusi. However, he was unsure if O. meyeri was also a synonym.

== Description ==
The largest of the jaw fragments measured 26.2 cm (10.3 in) in length and 8 cm (3.1 in) in height. 18 isolated teeth were found, ranging in size from 5–6 cm (2.0–2.4 in) in height and 1.8–2 cm (0.71–0.79 in) in width at the base. In comparison, the modern killer whale has teeth about 10–13 centimetres (4–5 in) in height and 2.5 cm (1 in) in diameter. The animal in life would probably have had 48 conical teeth in total, in comparison to the modern killer whale (O. orca) which has 40 to 56. The teeth of O. meyeri are distinct from the modern killer whale by having two vertical grooves originating at the tip.

== Paleoecology ==
The Orcinus lineage, like many other predatory marine lineages, may have fished up the food chain and progressively evolved to eat bigger and bigger food items, with Pliocene killer whales able to hunt large fish, and the modern killer whale able to hunt large whales.

Stockach is situated in the Molasse basin, which dates to the Early Miocene, and was submerged in the Western Paratethys Sea. The basin represents coastal waters and strong tidal currents, with an average depth of less than 50 m (160 ft). Central Europe, at this time, probably represented an upwelling area along a continental shelf, which attracted a variety of sea life, including swarming fish. Land was probably dominated by nearshore swamps which emptied into the sea, and the area featured ancient beavers, hedgehogs, several river turtle species, and various other semi-aquatic creatures. The sea progressively moved southwards, and the connection to the ocean closed about 17 million years ago (mya), turning the area into a system of brackish and freshwater lakes.

== See also ==
- Orcinus citoniensis
- Orcinus paleorca
