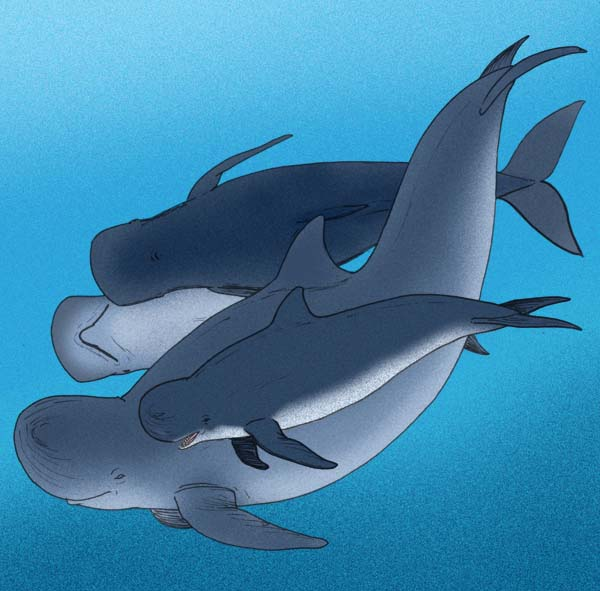
- Artist's reconstruction

Scientific classification
- Kingdom: Animalia
- Phylum: Chordata
- Class: Mammalia
- Order: Artiodactyla
- Infraorder: Cetacea
- Family: Delphinidae
- Subfamily: Orcininae
- Genus: †Platalearostrum; Post & Kompanje, 2010
- Species: †P. hoekmani

Binomial name
- †Platalearostrum hoekmani Post & Kompanje, 2010

= Blunt-snouted dolphin =

Blunt-snouted dolphin Temporal range: Middle Pliocene to Early Pleistocene

Extinct species of whale

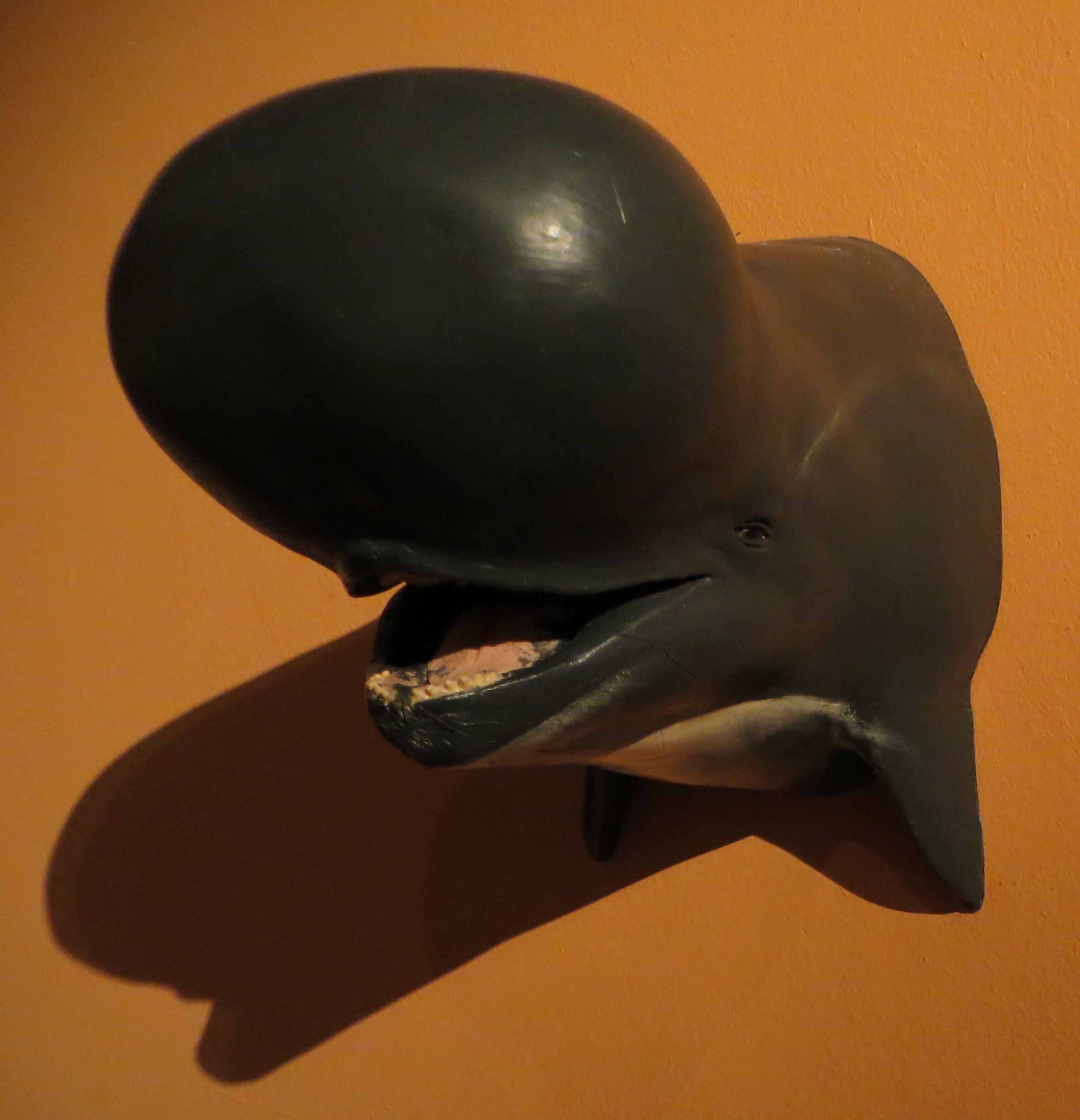
Model head

The blunt-snouted dolphin (Platalearostrum hoekmani, "Albert Hoekman's spoon-rostrum") is a prehistoric pilot whale known from a single specimen (NMR-9991-00005362), consisting of a partial rostrum, partial maxilla, partial premaxilla, and partial vomer. The fossil was discovered by Albert Hoekman on board a fishing trawler in the North Sea in 2008 and described in 2010 by Klaas Post and Erwin J.O. Kompanje. The blunt-snouted dolphin is believed to have had a balloonlike structure atop its rostrum and is estimated to have lived during the middle Pliocene to early Pleistocene.
