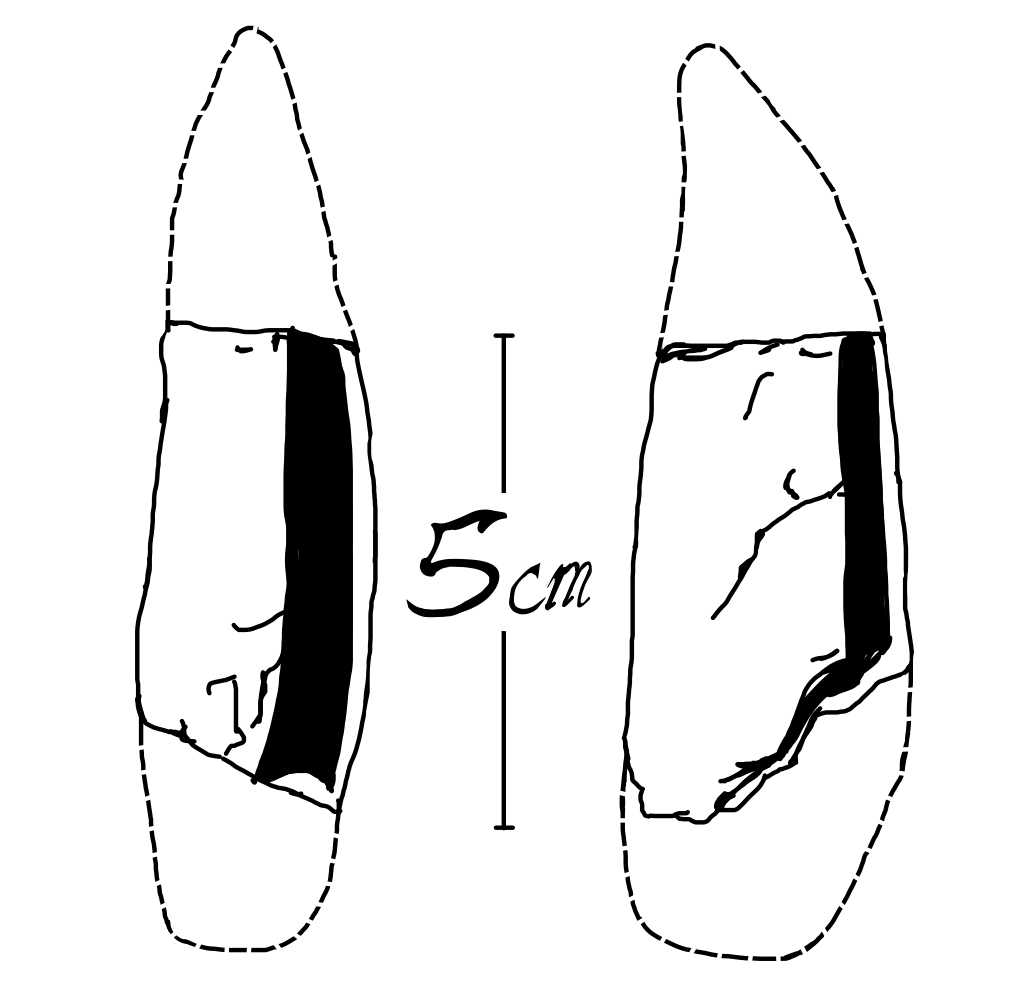
- O. paleorca holotype, front view (left) and side view (right). Dotted lines indicate inferred dimensions.

Scientific classification
- Kingdom: Animalia
- Phylum: Chordata
- Class: Mammalia
- Order: Artiodactyla
- Infraorder: Cetacea
- Family: Delphinidae
- Genus: Orcinus
- Species: †O. paleorca

Binomial name
- †Orcinus paleorca Matsumoto, 1937

= Orcinus paleorca =

Orcinus paleorca Temporal range: Early Pleistocene (Calabrian), 1.8–0.78 Ma

Extinct species of whale

Orcinus paleorca is an extinct species of Orcinus, the genus of killer whales (orca), dated to the Early Pleistocene (Calabrian age).

== Taxonomy ==
The holotype specimen, a tooth fragment, was found by G. Natsume in the Sanuki Formation in the Kazusa Province of Honshu, Japan, dated to the Calabrian age. It was described in 1937 by Japanese paleontologist Hikoshichiro Matsumoto. Orcinus paleorca could represent the ancestor of the modern killer whale (Orcinus orca). Matsumoto noted that the teeth of O. paleorca are much larger and have more similar dimensions to the modern killer whale than those of the Pliocene O. citoniensis.

== Description ==
The tooth is conical and belonged to the upper right or lower left jaw of an adult individual. The tooth fragment is 5 cm (2.0 in) in height–though the actual height may have been double that–2.25 cm (0.89 in) longitudinally–from the side facing the tongue to the side facing the lip–and 2.95 cm (1.16 in) transversely–from the left side of the tooth to the right. In comparison, the modern killer whale has teeth around 8 cm (3.1 in) in height and 2.5 cm (0.98 in) in diameter. Like the modern killer whale, the tooth lacks a coat of cementum. However, unlike the modern killer whale, O. paleorca had a circular tooth root as opposed to an oval, and the pulp extended more towards the back than the front.

== Paleobiology ==
Orcinus species, like many other predatory marine lineages, may have fished up the food chain, with the apparently more primitive O. citoniensis able to hunt large fish, and the modern killer whale's ability to hunt large whales.

The Middle Pleistocene deposits indicate a warm temperate climate, and temperate forests of land. The marine mammal diversity comprises O. paleorca, an undetermined species of Orcinus, the baleen whale Mizuhoptera, an unidentified oceanic dolphin, the fossil false killer whale Pseudorca yokoyamai, the fossil walrus Odobenus mandanoensis, an undetermined species of Eumetopias sea lion, and the recently extinct Steller's sea cow (Hydrodamalis gigas). Sharks present were the great white shark (Carcharodon carcharias) and the extinct broad-toothed mako (Cosmopolitodus hastalis).
