= Arimidelphis =

Arimidelphis Temporal range: 3.60–1.81 Ma

Scientific classification
- Kingdom: Animalia
- Phylum: Chordata
- Class: Mammalia
- Order: Artiodactyla
- Infraorder: Cetacea
- Family: Delphinidae
- Genus: †Arimidelphis
- Species: †A. sorbinii

Binomial name
- †Arimidelphis sorbinii Bianucci, 2005

Extinct genus of toothed whale

Arimidelphis is an extinct genus of toothed whale from the Piacenzian and Gelasian ages of the late Pliocene and early Pleistocene, containing only the species A. sorbinii. It was described by Giovanni Bianucci in 2005.

== Etymology ==
This genus was named after Ariminus, the Latin name of the Marecchia river.

== Taxonomy ==
When Arimidelphis was first described in 2005, it was placed in the subfamily Orcininae. Later, in 2014, it was moved to the family Delphinidae.

== Distribution ==
Fossils of this species were found in northern Italy.
