= Giovanni Capellini =

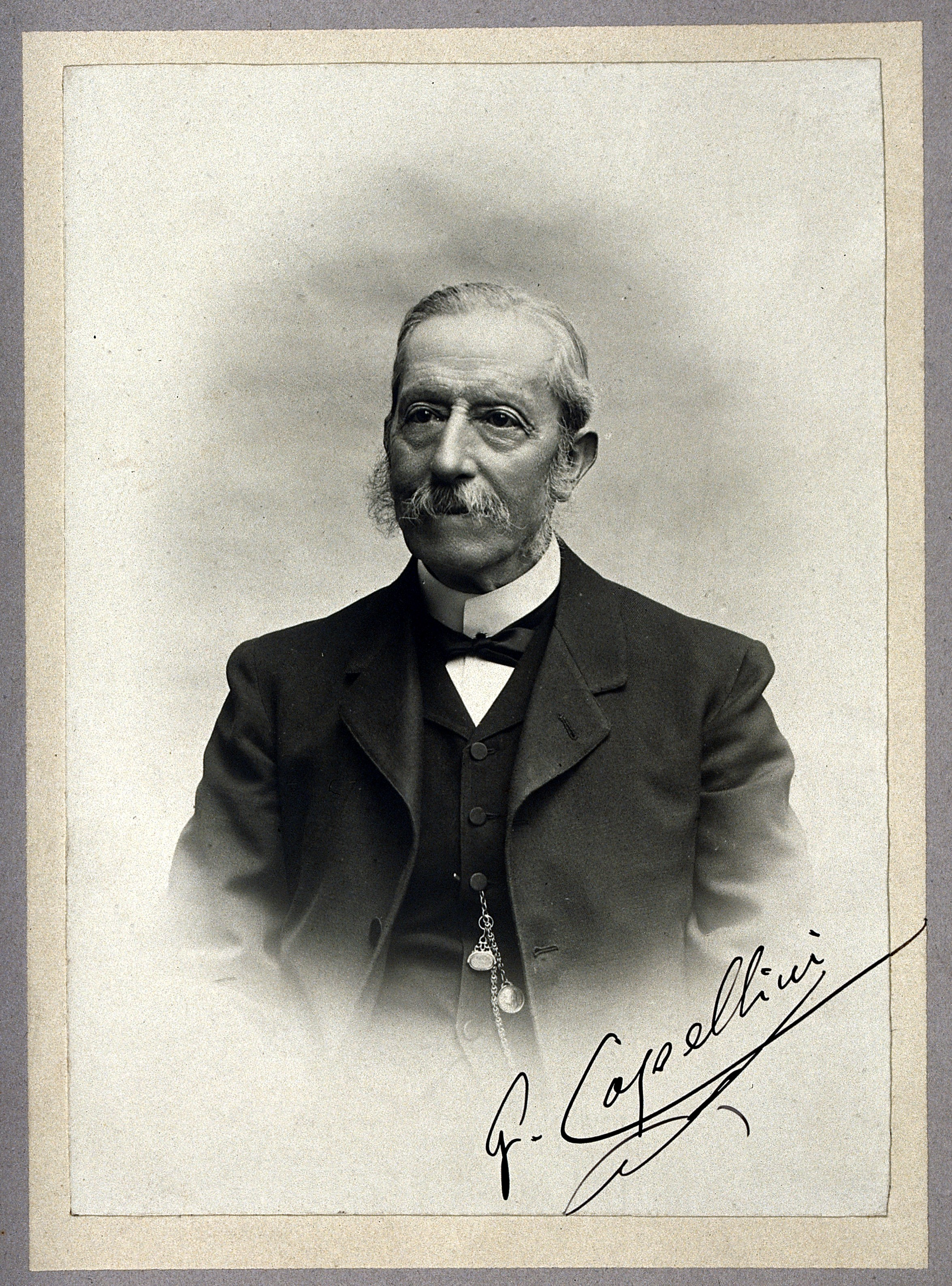
- Born: 23 August 1833; La Spezia, Liguria
- Died: 28 May 1922 (aged 88); Bologna
- Occupations: Geologist, paleontologist
- Awards: Hayden Memorial Geological Award (1896)

Giovanni Capellini (23 August 1833 – 28 May 1922) was an Italian geologist and paleontologist. He was a Senator of the Kingdom of Italy in the seventeenth legislature.

== Birth and education ==
Giovanni Capellini was born on 23 August 1833 in La Spezia, Liguria, son Pietro Francesco Capellini and Margherita Ferrarini. His family originated in Porto Venere. His parents intended that he should make a career as a musician, and then in the church. As a boy he collected interesting natural objects. In 1853 the future King Umberto I of Italy visited La Spezia, and Capellini was presented to him when he came to view the collection. Later Umberto called Capellini his oldest friend.

Capellini remained in the monks' school until his father died in 1854. To make a living he worked as a bookbinder, a teacher in a college of La Spezia and a manufacturer of electrical equipment. He was finally able to devote himself to geology thanks to the Rector of the Seminary of Pontremoli, who offered him the post of prefect at the seminary, and he continued his studies thanks to the Municipality of La Spezia, which paid for his costs at the University of Pisa. After graduating he embraced the profession of a geologist, and began his exploratory research on the Apuan Alps.

== Career ==
Umberto I of Italy, a lifetime friend and supporter of Capellini

Capellini's work was quickly appreciated in the academic world. He went to France to further his studies. On his return to Italy in 1860 he was appointed professor of natural history in the National College of Genoa, a position he held for a short time before being appointed Professor of Geology at the University of Bologna the next year. He was to hold this position for over sixty years. On this fiftieth anniversary as a teacher at Bologna he donated his huge collection of specimens from Europe and North America to the Museum of Geology of the Academy of Sciences of Bologna Institute.

From 1858, Capellini spent most of his holidays in research and meetings in other European countries, including France, Switzerland, Romania, Turkey, Great Britain, Belgium, Germany, Denmark, Sweden, Greece, and Hungary. Capellini's easy access to the Savoy royal family bought him access to the royalty of other European countries, which was to greatly help him in his work. In 1863 Capellini went to the United States and Canada, travelling in Nova Scotia, Quebec and Ontario and in the United States as far west as Nebraska, where he made his first true geological excavations. He was particularly impressed by the Smithsonian Museum in Washington, D.C.. He made many contacts and friends on this visit, as he had in Europe, which he was to use in his mission establishing international cooperation between geologists, including the exchange of comparative samples. Capellini was a supporter of Darwinism.

Starting with the 2nd Congress of Naturalists, held in La Spezia in 1865, Capellini led a series of international scientific congresses. In 1876 he was a member of the founding committee of the International Geological Congress. In 1873, he was elected as a member to the American Philosophical Society. Capellini was several times rector of the University of Bologna, and initiated the Geological Map of Italy project. From 1883 he was often President of the Italian Geological Society. He was also a member of the Accademia dei Lincei and many other societies. He died on 28 May 1922 in Bologna.

== Honors ==
Capellini received many honors:

- Grand'Ufficiale dell'Ordine della Corona d'Italia
- Commendatore dell'Ordine dei Santi Maurizio e Lazzaro
- Commendatore dell'Ordine del Salvatore (Regno di Grecia)
- Commendatore dell'Ordine di San Giacomo della Spada (Portogallo)
- Commendatore dell'Ordine del Dannebrog (Danimarca)
- Commendatore dell'Ordine della Stella Polare (Svezia)
- Cavaliere di IV classe dell'Ordine di Medjidié (Impero ottomano)
- Cavaliere dell'Ordine della Legion d'Onore (Francia)
- Cavaliere dell'Ordine della Rosa (Brasile)
- Cavaliere dell'Ordine dell'Immacolata Concezione di Vila Viçosa (Portogallo)

== Notes and references ==
Citations

Sources

- "CAPELLINI Giovanni". Senate of Italy. Archived from the original on 2014-08-08.
- Vai, Gian Battista (December 2002). "Giovanni Capellini and the origin of the International Geological Congress" (PDF). Episodes. 25 (4): 248–254. doi:10.18814/epiiugs/2002/v25i4/005. Archived from the original (PDF) on 2013-10-17.

External links

- Simonelli, Vittorio (9 January 1923). Commemorazione di Giovanni Capellini. University of Bologna.
