= Pseudorca yokoyamai =

Pseudorca yokoyamai Temporal range: Pleistocene

Scientific classification
- Kingdom: Animalia
- Phylum: Chordata
- Class: Mammalia
- Infraclass: Placentalia
- Order: Artiodactyla
- Infraorder: Cetacea
- Family: Delphinidae
- Genus: Pseudorca
- Species: †P. yokoyamai

Binomial name
- †Pseudorca yokoyamai Matsumoto, 1926

Extinct species of dolphin

Pseudorca yokoyamai is an extinct species of oceanic dolphin from the Calabrian stage of the Pleistocene of Japan, an extinct relative of the modern day false killer whale (P. crassidens).

== Discovery and taxonomy ==
Pseudorca yokoyamai was described in 1926 by Matsumoto Hikoshichiro of the Tohoku Imperial University. The holotype specimen is represented by two teeth–probably the very last two in the back of the mouth–and a paratype specimen consists of the right ramus of the mandible with seven teeth, though four teeth are incomplete. The holotype was found in Hommoku, Yokohama–the species name honoring the place of its discovery–and the paratype in the Kazusa Province on the opposite side of Tokyo Bay. It may represent an intermediary phase between the modern false killer whale and pilot whales (Globicephala spp.).

== Description ==
The teeth of P. yokoyamai are largely conical, though bend backward, with a smooth enamel coating. On the holotype, the second-to-last and last teeth measured respectively 47 and 50 mm (1.9 and 2.0 in) in height. P. yokowamai had smaller, though a greater number of, teeth than the modern false killer whale.

The paratype represents the last seven teeth in the jaw, and there were perhaps three or four more teeth in front of it. The diameter of the tooth crown at the gumline is 14–15 mm (0.55–0.59 in), and the series of seven teeth is 177 mm (7.0 in) long.
