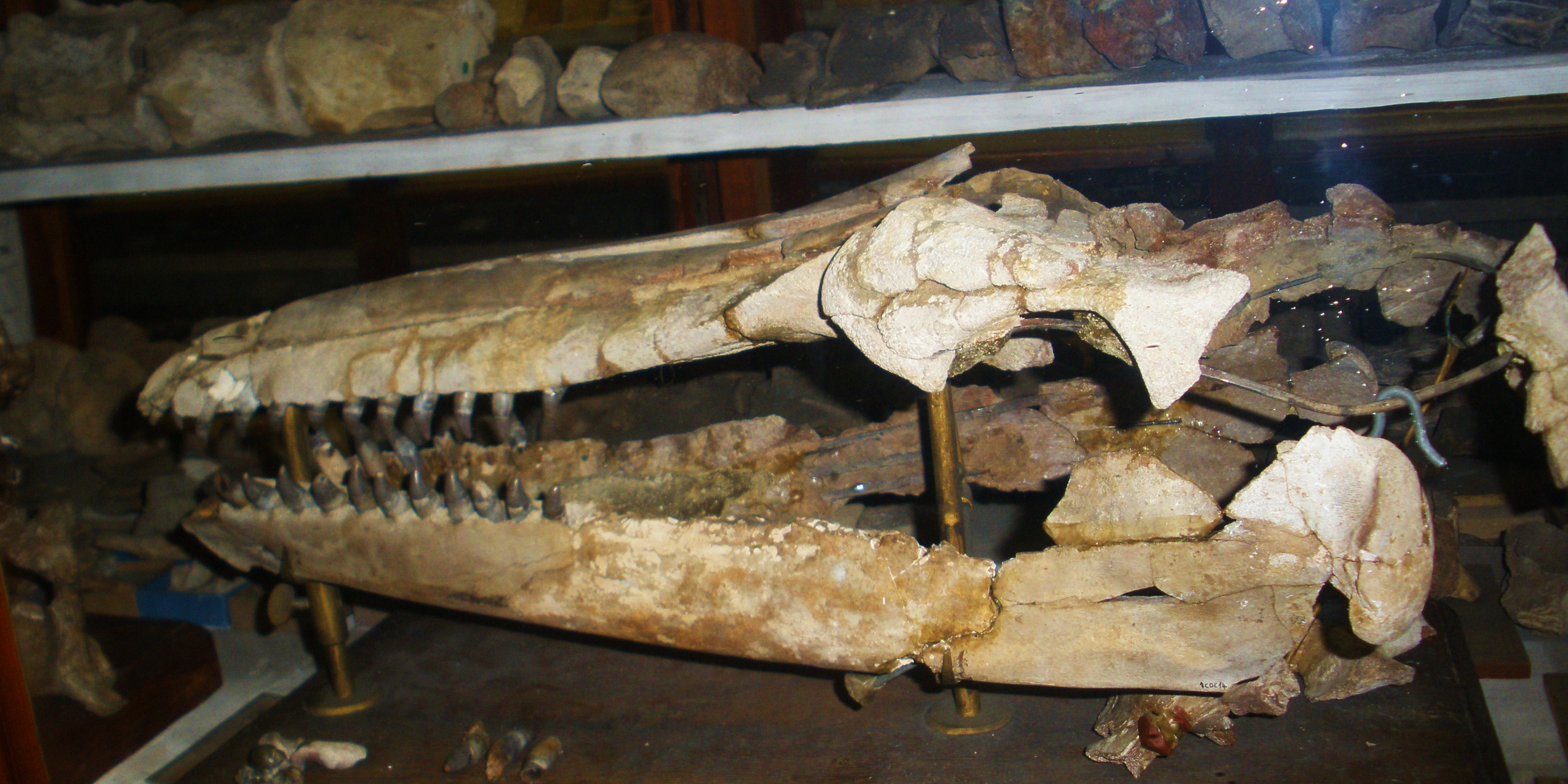
- Hemisyntrachelus cortesii skull

Scientific classification
- Kingdom: Animalia
- Phylum: Chordata
- Class: Mammalia
- Infraclass: Placentalia
- Order: Artiodactyla
- Infraorder: Cetacea
- Family: Delphinidae
- Subfamily: Orcininae
- Genus: †Hemisyntrachelus; Brandt 1873

Species
- H. cortesii Fischer 1829; H. oligodon Pilleri and Siber 1989; H. pisanus Biannuci 1996

Synonyms
- Delphinus cortesii

= Hemisyntrachelus =

Hemisyntrachelus Temporal range: Late Miocene-Quaternary ~5.333–1.806 Ma

Extinct genus of cetaceans

Hemisyntrachelus is an extinct genus of cetacean. This genus is known in the fossil record from the latest Miocene to the Quaternary (age range: from 5.332 to 1.806 million years ago). Fossils are found in the marine strata of Italy, the Netherlands, the Bahía Inglesa Formation of the Caldera Basin, Chile and in the fossiliferous Pisco Formation of Peru. It is estimated to have a body length of 3.5–4.3 m (11–14 ft).

== Paleobiology ==
The modern killer whale (Orcinus orca)

Hemisyntrachelus occupied an ecological niche similar to that of modern false killer whale and bottlenose dolphin. Hemisyntrachelus likely consumed a diverse diet ranging from medium to large bony fish and squid to small marine mammals. It is thought to have had a diet similar to that of modern false killer whales and to have engaged in opportunistic hunting. Fossil evidence suggests that Hemisyntrachelus was preyed upon by sharks such as the great white shark (Carcharodon carcharias) and the related Carcharodon plicatilis. It is possible that they formed groups similar to modern dolphins to defend against these predators.
