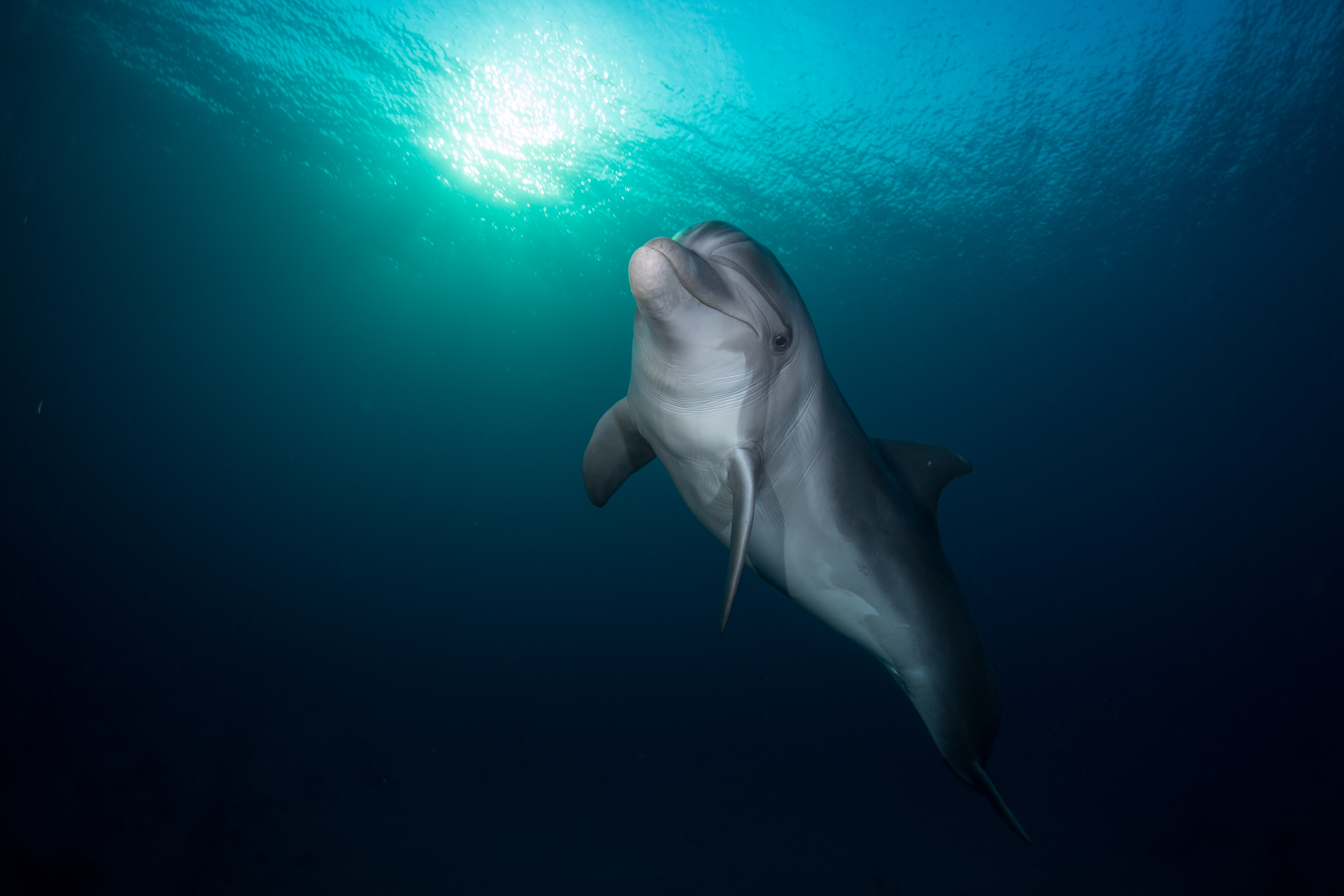
- Indo-Pacific bottlenose dolphin

Scientific classification
- Kingdom: Animalia
- Phylum: Chordata
- Class: Mammalia
- Order: Artiodactyla
- Infraorder: Cetacea
- Superfamily: Delphinoidea
- Family: Delphinidae; Gray, 1821

Type genus
- Delphinus Linnaeus, 1758

Genera
- See text.
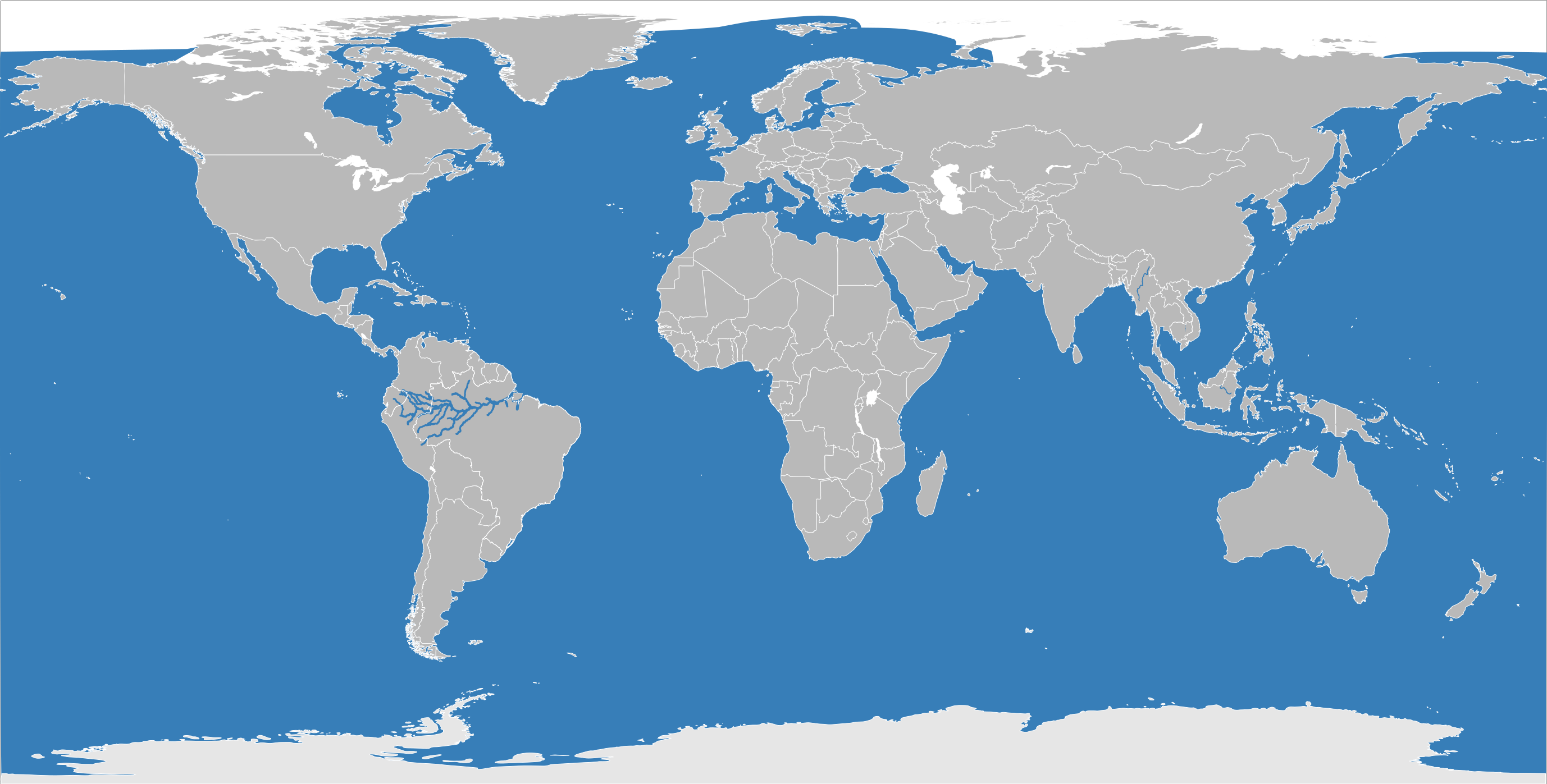
- Delphinidae distribution

= Oceanic dolphin =

Oceanic dolphin Temporal range: Late Oligocene – Recent

Family of marine mammals

Oceanic dolphins or Delphinidae are a widely distributed family of dolphins that live in the sea. Close to forty extant species are recognised. They include several large species whose common names contain "whale" rather than "dolphin", such as the Globicephalinae (round-headed whales, which include the false killer whale and pilot whale). Delphinidae is a family within the superfamily Delphinoidea, which also includes the porpoises (Phocoenidae) and the Monodontidae (beluga whale and narwhal). River dolphins are a grouping of at least three cetacean superfamilies which form a sister group to Delphinoidea.

Oceanic dolphins range in size from the 1.7-metre-long (5 ft 7 in) and 50-kilogram (110-pound) Maui's dolphin to the 9.4-metre (31 ft) and 10-metric-ton (11-short-ton) orca, the largest known dolphin. Several species exhibit sexual dimorphism; the males are larger than females. They have streamlined muscular bodies and two limbs that are modified into flippers. Though not quite as flexible as seals, some dolphins can travel at speeds 29 km/h (18 mph) for short distances. Most delphinids primarily eat fish, along with a smaller number of squid and small crustaceans, but some species specialise in eating squid, or, in the case of the orca, also eat marine mammals and birds. All, however, are purely carnivorous. They typically have between 100 and 200 teeth, although a few species have considerably fewer. Delphinids travel in large pods, which may number a thousand individuals in some species. Each pod forages over a range of tens to hundreds of square kilometres. Some pods have a loose social structure, with individuals frequently joining or leaving, but others seem to be more permanent, perhaps dominated by a male and a harem of females. Individuals communicate by sound, producing low-frequency whistles, and also produce high-frequency broadband clicks of 80–220 kHz, which are primarily used for echolocation. Gestation lasts from 10 to 18 months, and results in the birth of a single calf. Some species are well adapted for diving to great depths. They have a layer of fat, or blubber, under the skin to keep warm in the cold water.

Although oceanic dolphins are widespread, most species prefer the warmer waters of the tropic zones, but some, like the right whale dolphin, prefer colder climates. Some have a global distribution, like the orca. Oceanic dolphins feed largely on fish and squid, but a few, like the orca, feed on large mammals, like seals. Male dolphins typically mate with multiple females every year, but females only mate every two to three years. Calves are typically born in the spring and summer, and females bear all the responsibility for raising them. Mothers of some species fast and nurse their young for relatively long times. Dolphins produce a variety of vocalizations, usually in the form of clicks and whistles.

Oceanic dolphins are sometimes hunted in places such as Japan and the Faroe Islands in an activity known as dolphin drive hunting. Besides drive hunting, they also face threats from bycatch, habitat loss, and marine pollution. Dolphins have been depicted in various cultures worldwide. They occasionally feature in literature and film, as in the Warner Bros film Free Willy. Dolphins are sometimes kept in captivity and trained to perform in shows. The most common species of dolphin in captivity is the bottlenose dolphin, and less than 50 orca were found in oceanariums in 2012.

== Taxonomy ==
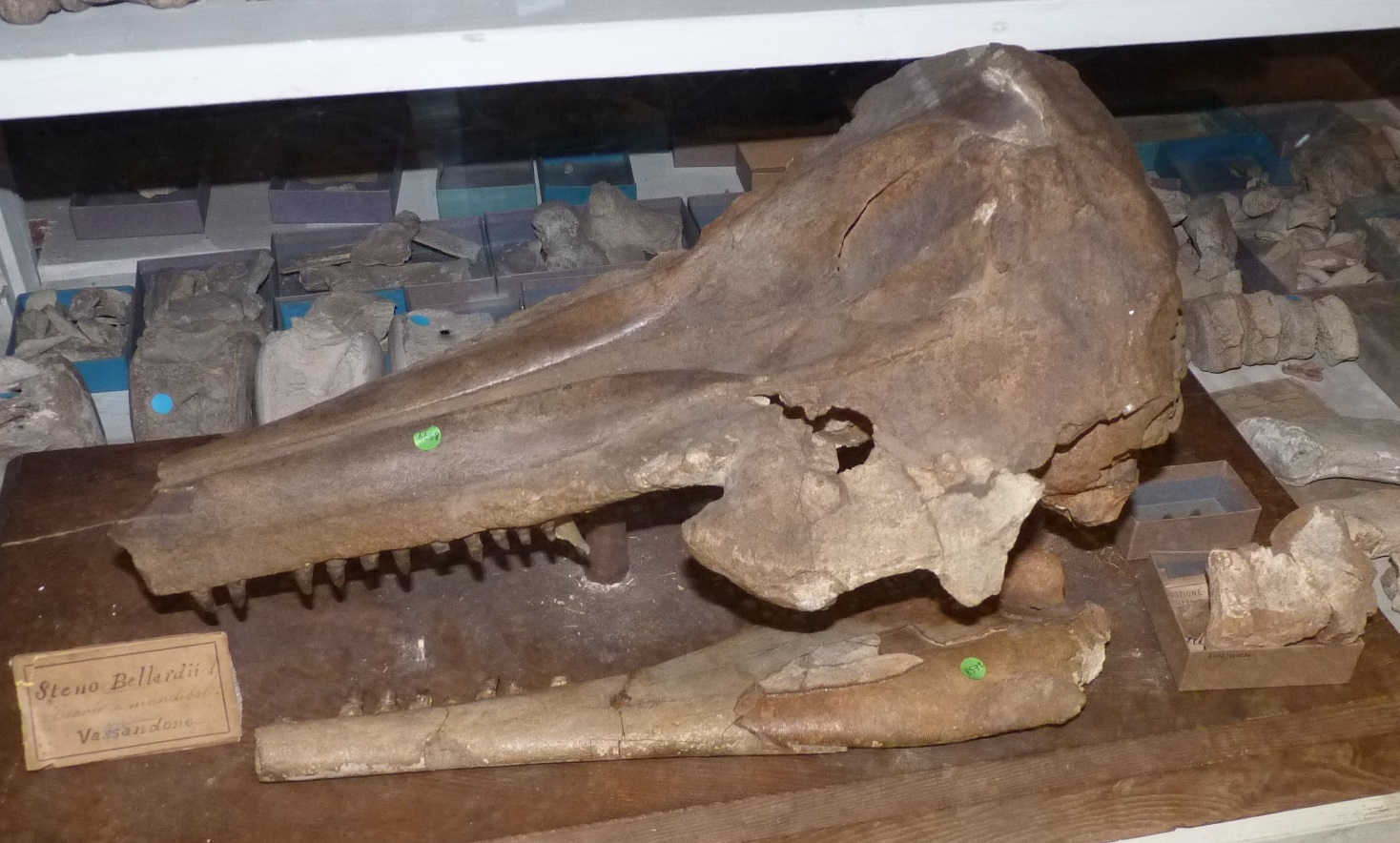
Etruridelphis giulii skull in Bologna

Delphinids, especially bottlenose dolphins, are able to hybridize with a wide variety of other delphinid species; wholphins are just one of many possible hybrids.

Six species, sometimes referred to as "blackfish", are dolphins commonly called whales: the orca, the melon-headed whale, the pygmy killer whale, the false killer whale, and the two species of pilot whales, but they are classified under the family Delphinidae.

Recent molecular analyses indicate that several delphinid genera (especially Stenella) are not monophyletic as currently recognized. Thus, significant taxonomic revisions within the family are likely. In 2025 there was significant revision of the genus Lagenorhynchus.

A classification of the family Delphinidae from Perrin (1989) reflecting a traditional view of species interrelationships.	Revised classification of the family Delphinidae based on molecular systematic analysis; adapted from LeDuc et al. (1999) and McGowen et al. (2019).	Species recognized by Society for Marine Mammalogy's taxonomic Committee (2025)
Family Delphinidae; Subfamily Stenoninae; Steno bredanensis; Sousa chinensis; Sousa teuszii; Sotalia fluviatilis; Subfamily Delphininae; Lagenorhynchus albirostris; Lagenorhynchus acutus; Lagenorhynchus obscurus; Lagenorhynchus obliquidens; Lagenorhynchus cruciger; Lagenorhynchus australis; Grampus griseus; Tursiops truncatus; Stenella frontalis; Stenella attenuata; Stenella longirostris; Stenella clymene; Stenella coeruleoalba; Delphinus delphis; Lagenodelphis hosei; Subfamily Lissodelphininae; Lissodelphis borealis; Lissodelphis peronii; Subfamily Cephalorhynchinae; Cephalorhynchus commersonii; Cephalorhynchus eutropia; Cephalorhynchus heavisidii; Cephalorhynchus hectori; Subfamily Globicephalinae; Peponocephala electra; Feresa attenuata; Pseudorca crassidens; Orcinus orca; Globicephala melas; Globicephala macrorhynchus; Subfamily Orcaellinae; Orcaella brevirostris	Family Delphinidae; Subfamily Delphininae; Sotalia fluviatilis; Sotalia guianensis; Sousa chinensis; Sousa sahulensis; Sousa plumbea; Sousa teuszii; Tursiops truncatus; Tursiops aduncus; Stenella frontalis; Stenella attenuata; Stenella coeruleoalba; Delphinus delphis; Lagenodelphis hosei; Stenella clymene; Stenella longirostris; Subfamily Lissodelphininae; Lissodelphis borealis; Lissodelphis peronii; Sagmatias obscurus; Sagmatias obliquidens; Sagmatias cruciger; Cephalorhynchus heavisidii; Cephalorhynchus hectori; Cephalorhynchus eutropia; Cephalorhynchus commersonii; Sagmatias australis; Subfamily Globicephalinae; Orcaella brevirostris; Orcaella heinsohni; Steno bredanensis; Grampus griseus; Pseudorca crassidens; Globicephala melas; Globicephala macrorhynchus; Peponocephala electra; Feresa attenuata; Subfamily Orcininae; Orcinus orca; Subfamily incertae sedis; Lagenorhynchus albirostris; Leucopleurus acutus	Family Delphinidae; Subfamily Delphininae; Delphinus delphis; Lagenodelphis hosei; Sousa teuszii; Sousa chinensis; Sousa plumbea; Sousa sahulensis; Sotalia fluviatilis; Sotalia guianensis; Stenella attenuata; Stenella clymene; Stenella coeruleoalba; Stenella frontalis; Stenella longirostris; Tursiops aduncus; Tursiops erebennus; Tursiops truncatus; Subfamily Lissodelphininae; Aethalodelphis obliquidens; Aethalodelphis obscurus; Cephalorhynchus australis; Cephalorhynchus commersonii; Cephalorhynchus cruciger; Cephalorhynchus eutropia; Cephalorhynchus heavisidii; Cephalorhynchus hectori; Lissodelphis borealis; Lissodelphis peronii; Subfamily Globicephalinae; Feresa attenuata; Globicephala macrorhynchus; Globicephala melas; Grampus griseus; Orcaella brevirostris; Orcaella heinsohni; Peponocephala electra; Pseudorca crassidens; Steno bredanensis; Subfamily Orcininae; Orcinus orca; Subfamily incerta sedis; Lagenorhynchus albirostris; Leucopleurus acutus

Extinct taxa:

- Subfamily Delphininae
  - †Astadelphis
  - †Etruridelphis
  - †Septidelphis
- Subfamily Globicephalinae
  - †Platalearostrum
  - †Protoglobicephala
  - †Rododelphis
- †Arimidelphis
- †Australodelphis
- †Eodelphinus
- †Hemisyntrachelus
- †Norisdelphis
- †Pliodelphis
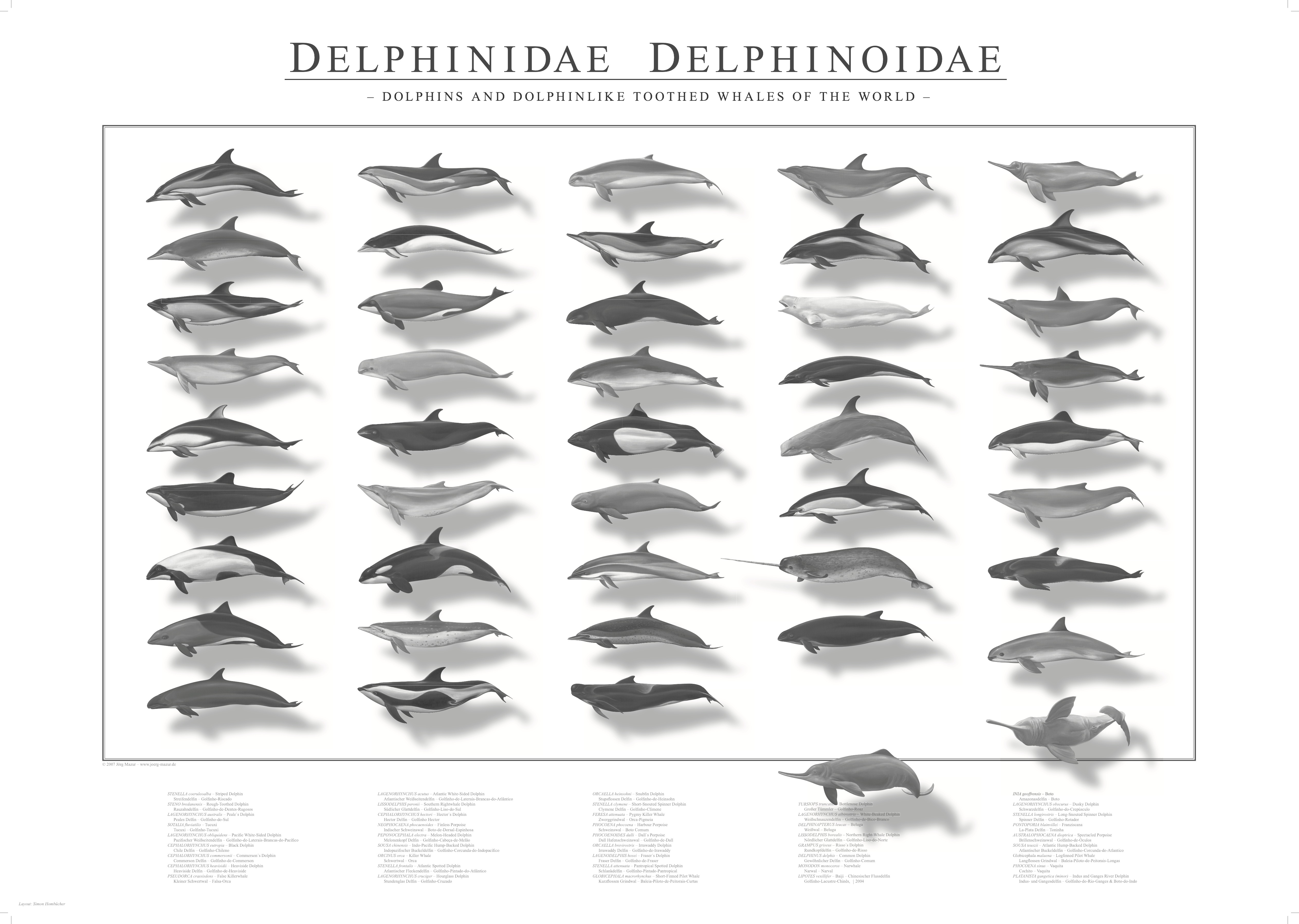
Dolphins and dolphinlike toothed whales

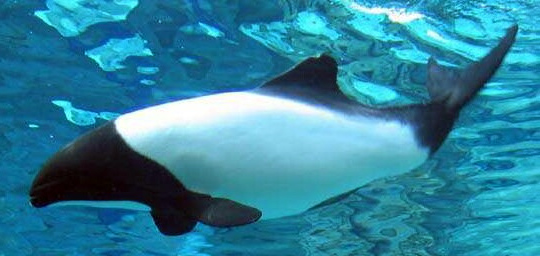
Cephalorhynchus commersonii

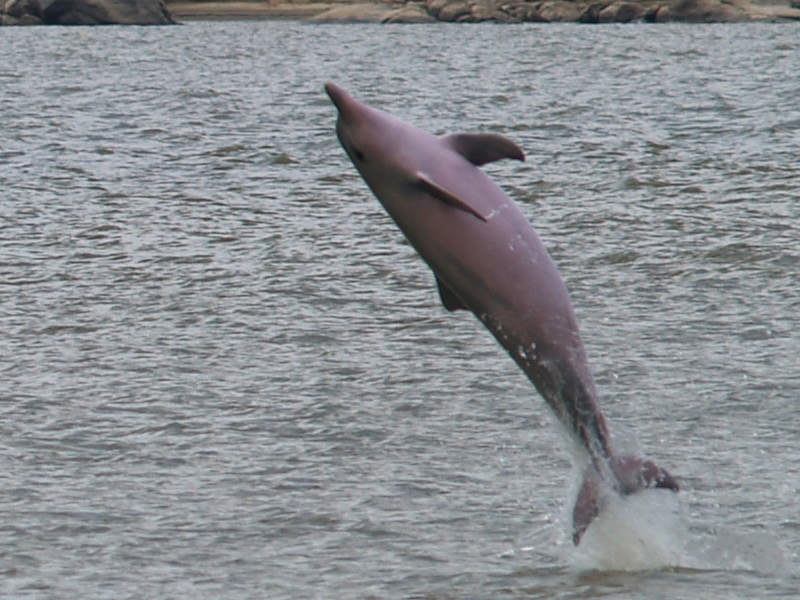
Sotalia fluviatilis

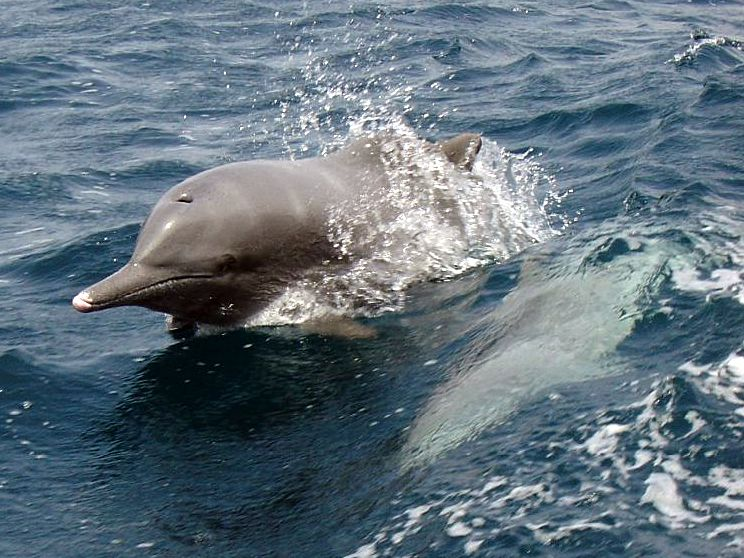
Sousa plumbea

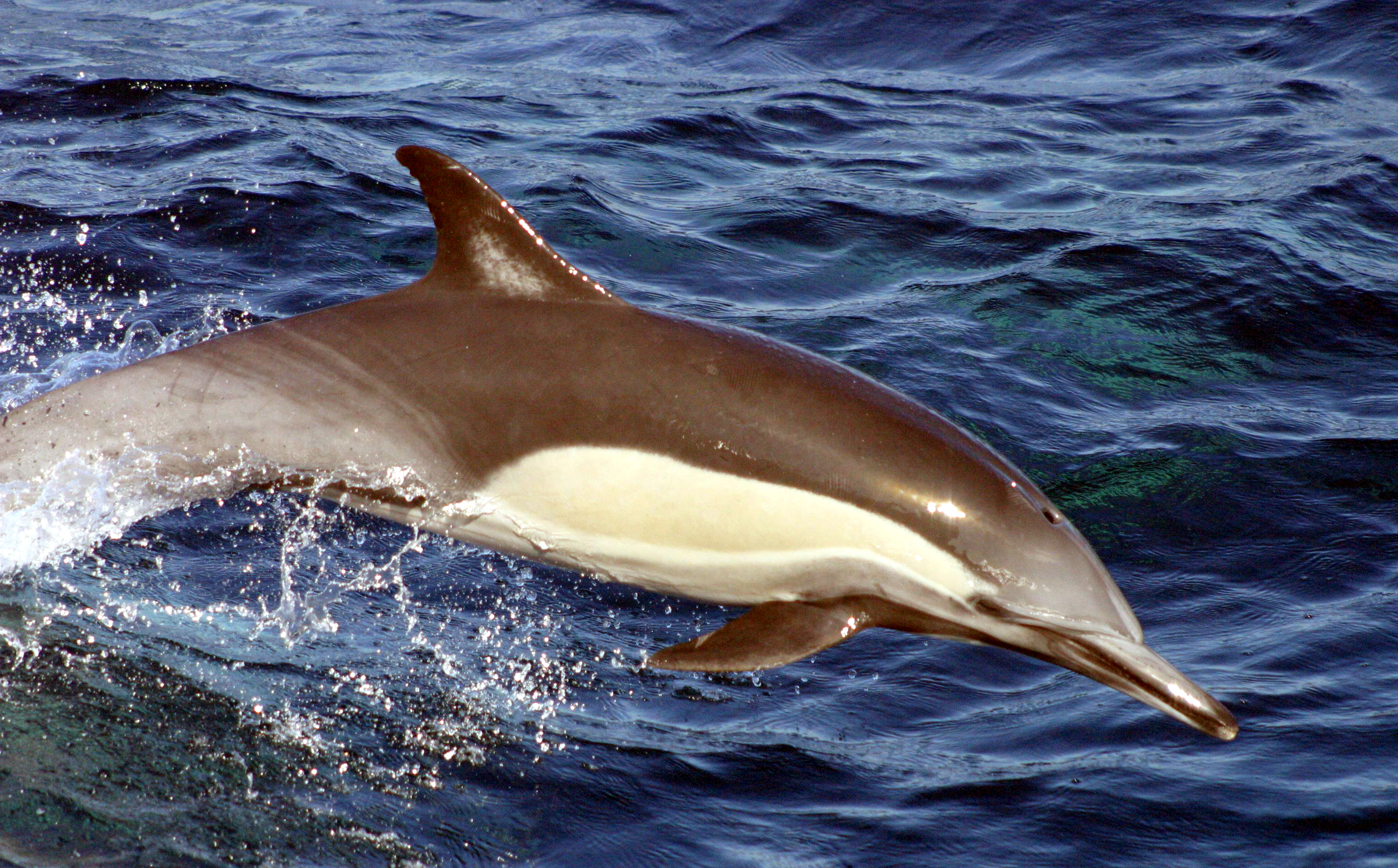
Delphinus capensis

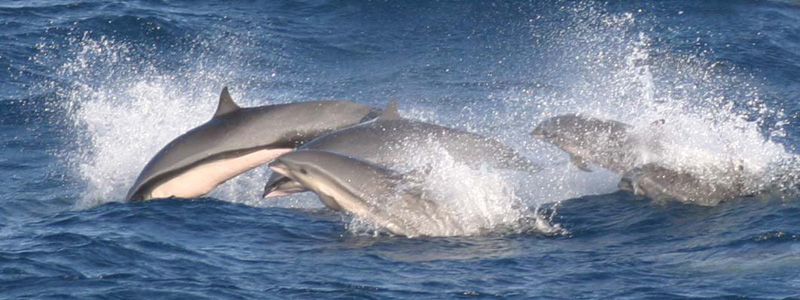
Lagenodelphis hosei

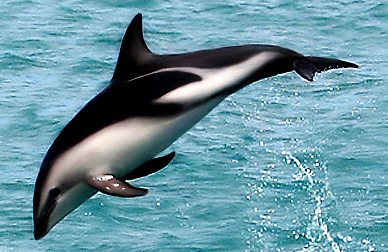
Aethalodelphis obscurus

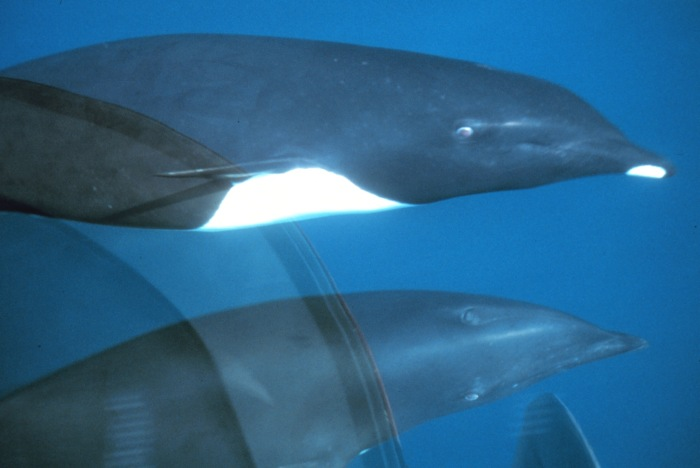
Lissodelphis borealis

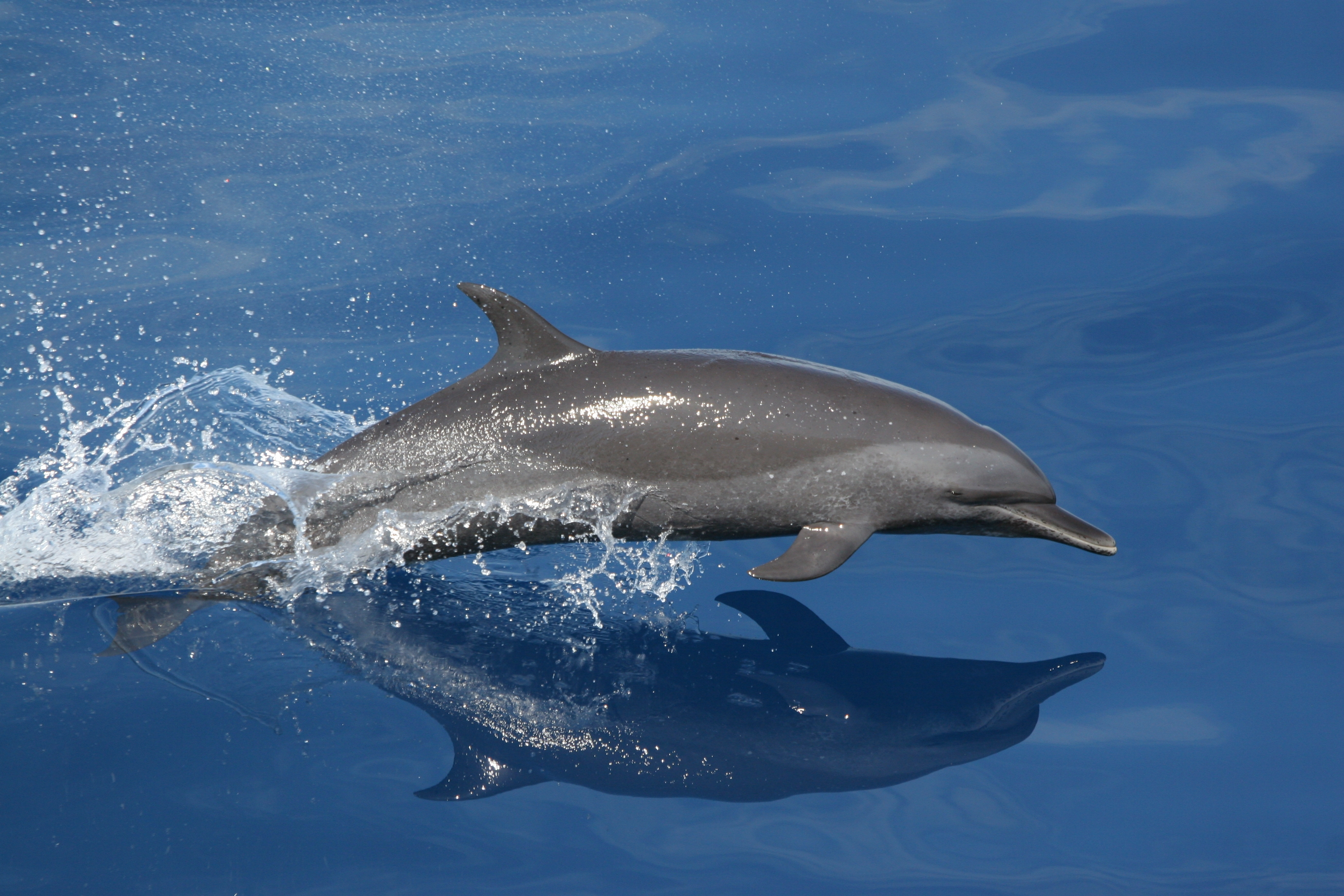
Stenella attenuata

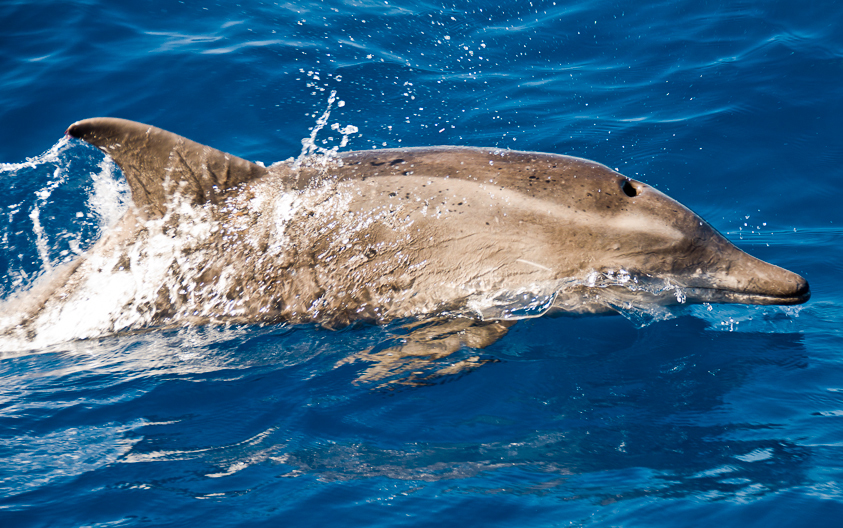
Steno bredanensis

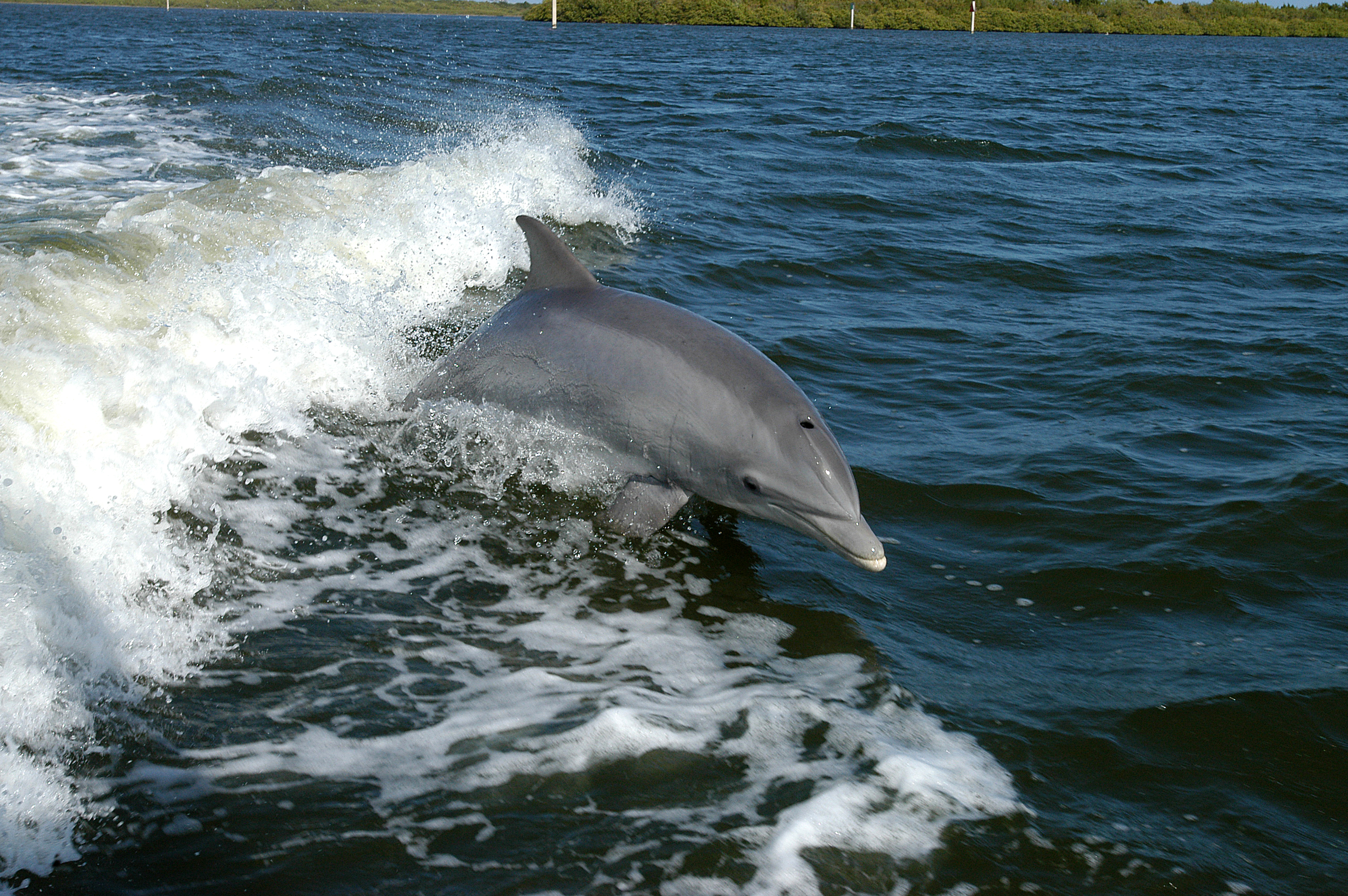
Tursiops truncatus

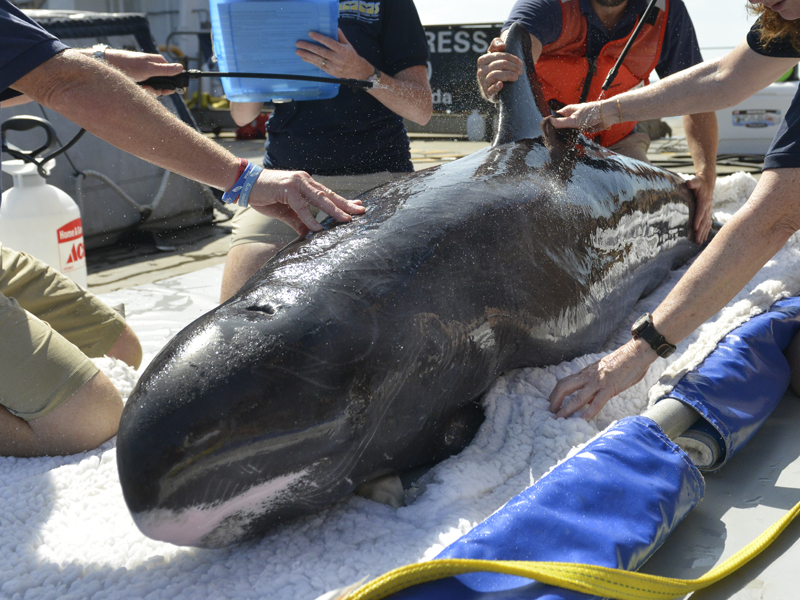
Feresa attenuata

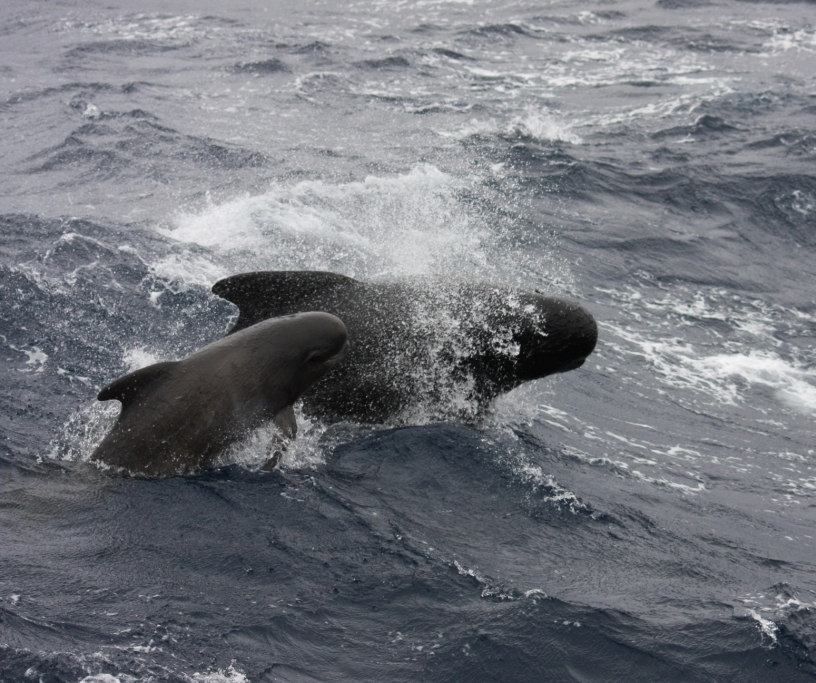
Globicephala melas

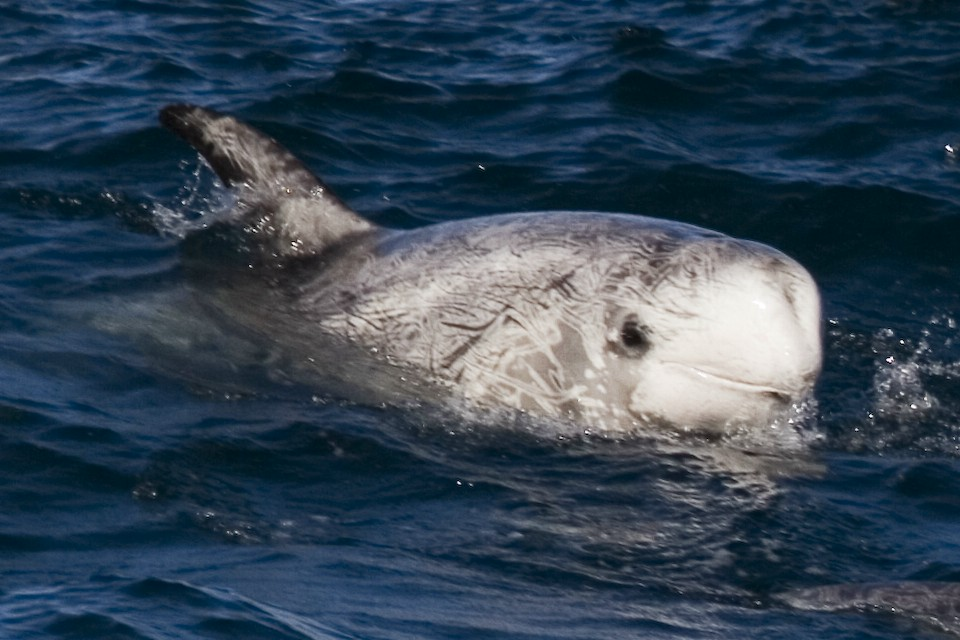
Grampus griseus

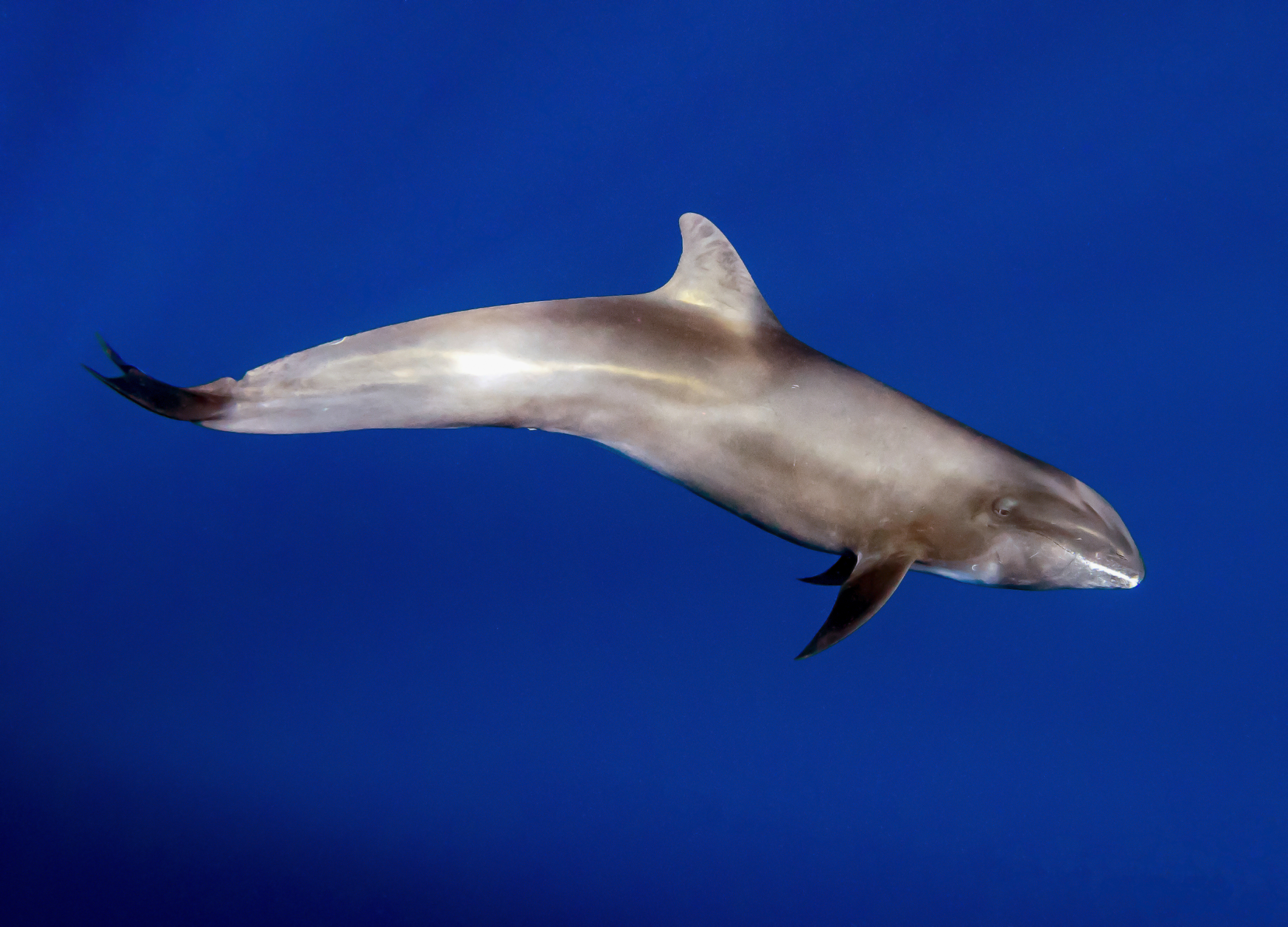
Peponocephala electra

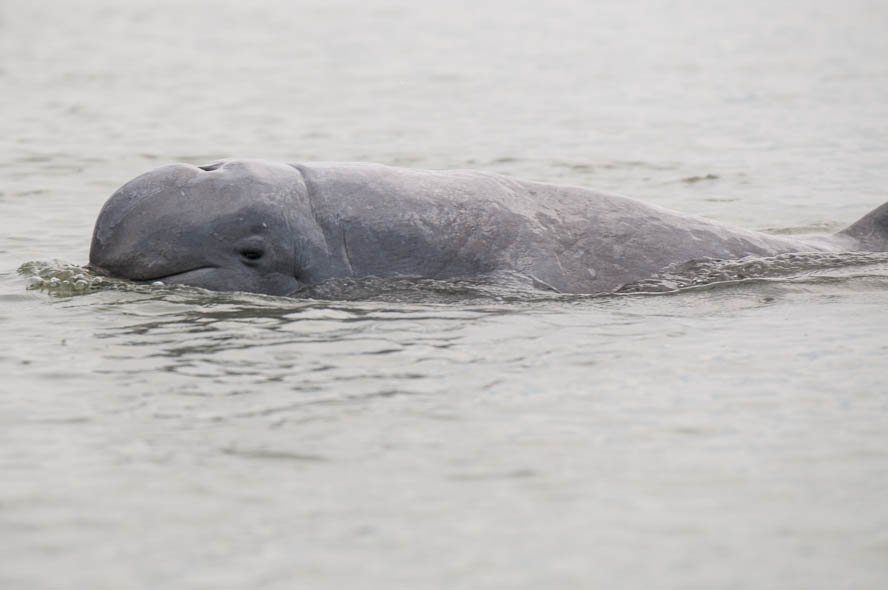
Orcaella brevirostris

Orcinus orca

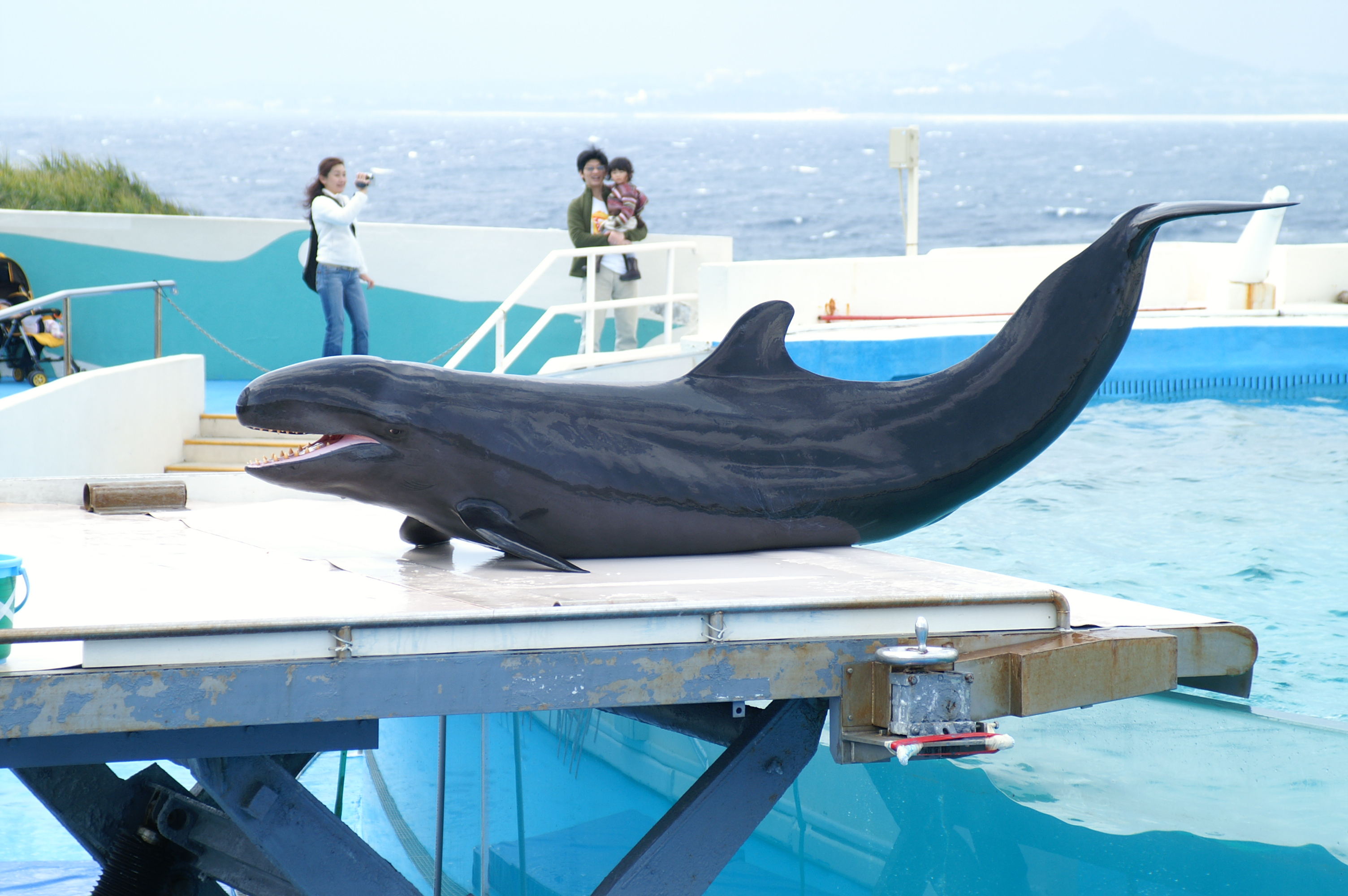
Pseudorca crassidens

== Biology ==
=== Anatomy ===
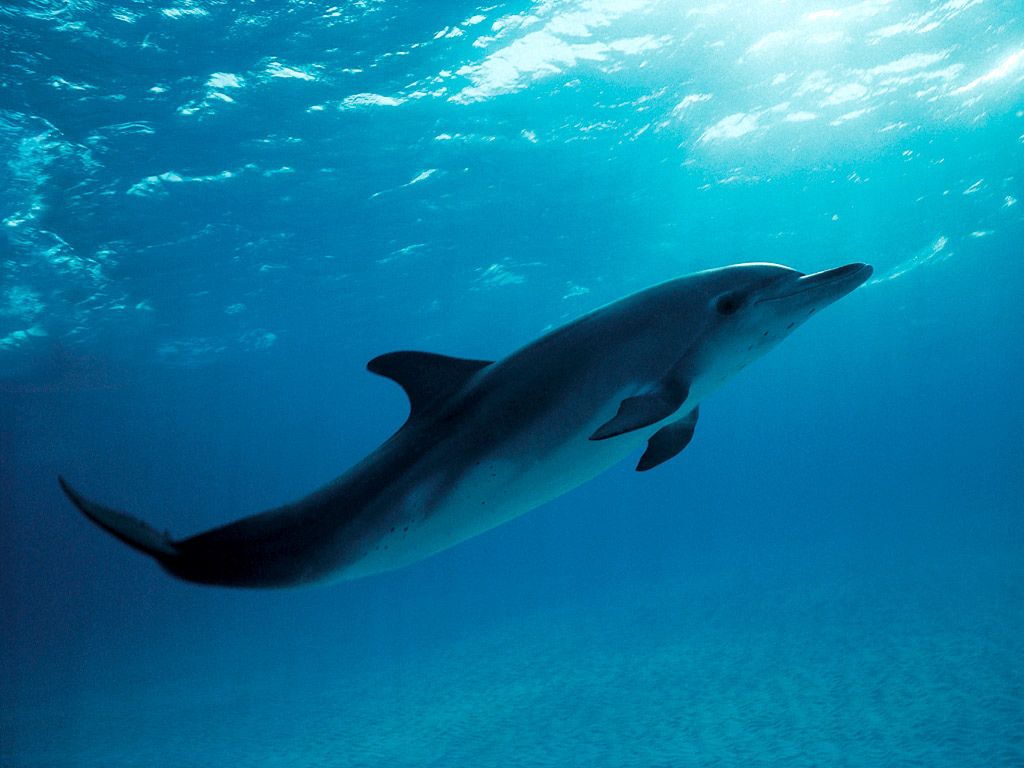
Atlantic spotted dolphin

The Delphinidae are the most diverse of the cetacean families, with numerous variations between species. They range in size from 1.2 m (3 ft 11 in) and 40 kg (88 lb) (Haviside's dolphin), to 9 m (30 ft) and 10 tonnes (orca). Most species weigh between 50 and 200 kg (110 and 440 lb). They typically have curved dorsal fins, clear 'beaks' at the front of their heads, and forehead melons, although exceptions to all of these rules are found. They have a wide range of colors and patterns.

Oceanic dolphins have a torpedo-shaped, muscular body with an inflexible neck, limbs modified into flippers, nonexistent external ear flaps, a large tail fin, and a bulbous head. A dolphin skull has small eye orbits, a long snout, but not as long as its river dolphin counterpart, and eyes placed on the sides of its head. Several species exhibit sexual dimorphism, with the males being larger than the females.

Breathing involves expelling stale air from the blowhole, forming an upward, steamy spout, followed by inhaling fresh air into the lungs; a spout only occurs when the warm air from the lungs meets the cold external air, so it may only form in colder climates.

All oceanic dolphins have a thick layer of blubber, the thickness of which depends on how far the species lives from the equator. This blubber also helps keep the animal warm providing insulation from the harsh climate or cold depths. It can also aid in protection to some extent as predators would have a hard time getting through a thick layer of fat. Calves are born with only a thin layer of blubber, but some species compensate for this with lanugos.

=== Locomotion ===
Oceanic dolphins have two flippers on the underside toward the head, a dorsal fin, and a tail fin. These flippers contain four digits. Although oceanic dolphins do not possess fully developed hind limbs, some possess discrete rudimentary appendages, which may contain feet and digits. Oceanic dolphins are fast swimmers in comparison to seals who typically cruise at 11–27 km/h (7–17 mph); the orca, in comparison, can travel at speeds of up to 55.5 km/h (34.5 mph). The fusing of the neck vertebrae, while increasing stability when swimming at high speeds, decreases flexibility, which means they are unable to turn their heads. Oceanic dolphins swim by moving their tail fin and rear body vertically, while their flippers are mainly used for steering. Some species log out of the water, which may allow them to travel faster. Their skeletal anatomy allows them to be fast swimmers. All species except the right whale dolphins have a dorsal fin to prevent themselves from involuntarily spinning in the water.

=== Senses ===
Biosonar by cetaceans

The oceanic dolphin ear is specifically adapted to the marine environment. In humans, the middle ear works as an impedance equalizer between the outside air's low impedance and the cochlear fluid's high impedance. In dolphins, and other marine mammals, there is no great difference between the outer and inner environments. Instead of sound passing through the outer ear to the middle ear, dolphins receive sound through the throat, from which it passes through a low-impedance fat-filled cavity to the inner ear. The dolphin ear is acoustically isolated from the skull by air-filled sinus pockets, which allow for greater directional hearing underwater. Dolphins send out high frequency clicks from an organ known as a melon. This melon consists of fat, and the skull of any such creature containing a melon will have a large depression. This allows dolphins to produce biosonar for orientation. Though most dolphins do not have hair, they do have hair follicles that may perform some sensory function. Beyond locating an object, echolocation also provides the animal with an idea on an object's shape and size, though how exactly this works is not yet understood.

The eye of oceanic dolphins is relatively small for its size, yet they do retain a good degree of eyesight. As well as this, the eyes of a dolphin are placed on the sides of its head, so their vision consists of two fields, rather than a binocular view like humans have. When dolphins surface, their lens and cornea correct the nearsightedness that results from the refraction of light; they contain both rod and cone cells, meaning they can see in both dim and bright light. Dolphins do, however, lack short wavelength sensitive visual pigments in their cone cells indicating a more limited capacity for color vision than most mammals. Most dolphins have slightly flattened eyeballs, enlarged pupils (which shrink as they surface to prevent damage), slightly flattened corneas and a tapetum lucidum; these adaptations allow for large amounts of light to pass through the eye and, therefore, a very clear image of the surrounding area. They also have glands on the eyelids and outer corneal layer that act as protection for the cornea.

The olfactory lobes are absent in oceanic dolphins, suggesting that they have no sense of smell.

Oceanic dolphins are not thought to have a good sense of taste, as their taste buds are atrophied or missing altogether. However, some have preferences between different kinds of fish, indicating some sort of attachment to taste.

== Behavior ==
=== Feeding ===
Most delphinids primarily eat fish, along with a smaller number of squid and small crustaceans, but some species specialize in eating squid, or, in the case of the orca, also eat marine mammals and birds. All, however, are purely carnivorous. They typically have between 100 and 200 teeth, although a few species have considerably fewer. Various methods of feeding exist among and within oceanic species, some apparently exclusive to a single population. Fish and squid are the main food, but the false killer whale and the orca also feed on other marine mammals. Orca on occasion also hunt whales larger than themselves.

One common feeding method is herding, where a pod squeezes a school of fish into a bait ball. Individual members then take turns plowing through the ball, feeding on the stunned fish. Corralling is a method where dolphins chase fish into shallow water to catch them more easily. Orca and bottlenose dolphins have also been known to drive their prey onto a beach to feed on it, a behavior known as beach or strand feeding. Some species also whack fish with their flukes, stunning them and sometimes knocking them out of the water.

=== Vocalizations ===
Oceanic dolphins are capable of making a broad range of sounds using nasal airsacs located just below the blowhole. Roughly three categories of sounds can be identified: frequency modulated whistles, burst-pulsed sounds, and clicks. Dolphins communicate with whistle-like sounds produced by vibrating connective tissue, similar to the way human vocal cords function, and through burst-pulsed sounds, though the nature and extent of that ability is not known. The clicks are directional and are for echolocation, often occurring in a short series called a click train. The click rate increases when approaching an object of interest. Dolphin echolocation clicks are amongst the loudest sounds made by marine animals.

Bottlenose dolphins have been found to have signature whistles. These whistles are used in order for dolphins to communicate with one another by identifying an individual. It can be seen as the dolphin equivalent of a name for humans. These signature whistles are developed during a dolphin's first year; it continues to maintain the same sound throughout its lifetime. In order to obtain each individual whistle sound, dolphins undergo vocal production learning. This consists of an experience with other dolphins that modifies the signal structure of an existing whistle sound. An auditory experience influences the whistle development of each dolphin. Dolphins are able to communicate to one another by addressing another dolphin through mimicking their whistle. The signature whistle of a male bottlenose dolphin tends to be similar to that of his mother, while the signature whistle of a female bottlenose dolphin tends to be more distinguishable. Bottlenose dolphins have a strong memory when it comes to these signature whistles, as they are able to relate to a signature whistle of an individual they have not encountered for over twenty years. Research done on signature whistle usage by other dolphin species is relatively limited. The research on other species done so far has yielded varied outcomes and inconclusive results.

=== Surfacing behavior and play ===
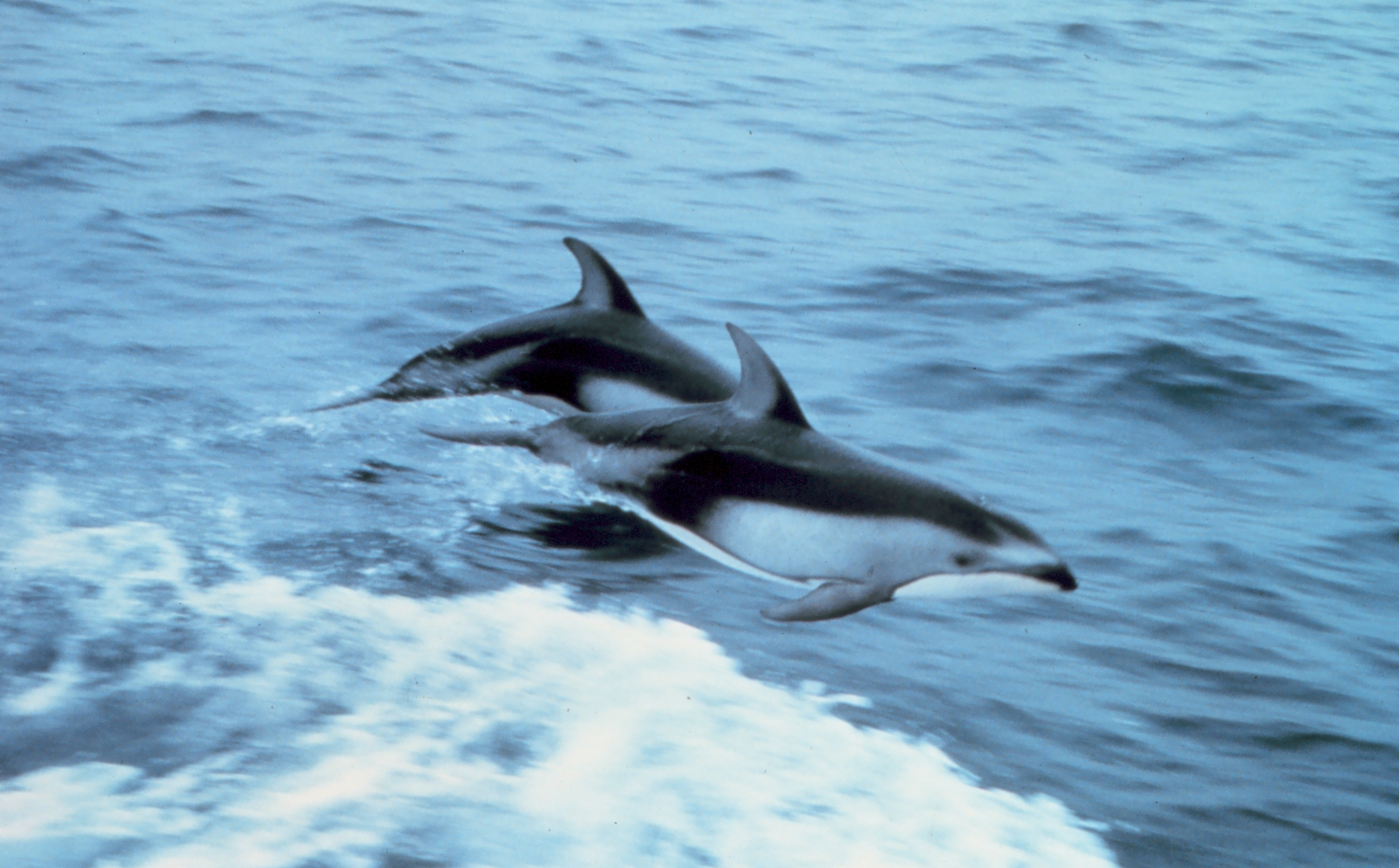
Pacific white-sided dolphins porpoising

Oceanic dolphins frequently leap above the water surface, this being done for various reasons. When travelling, jumping can save the dolphin energy as there is less friction while in the air. This type of travel is known as porpoising. Other reasons include orientation, social displays, fighting, non-verbal communication, entertainment and attempting to dislodge parasites.

Dolphins show various types of playful behavior, often including objects, self-made bubble rings, other dolphins, or other animals. When playing with objects or small animals, common behavior includes carrying the object or animal along using various parts of the body, passing it along to other members of the group or taking it from another member, or throwing it out of the water. Dolphins have also been observed harassing animals in other ways, for example by dragging birds underwater without showing any intent to eat them. Playful behaviour that involves another animal species with active participation of the other animal can also be observed, however. Playful human interaction with dolphins is one example, but playful interactions have been observed in the wild with a number of other species as well, including humpback whales and dogs.

=== Intelligence ===
Oceanic dolphins are known to teach, learn, cooperate, scheme, and grieve. The neocortex of many species is home to elongated spindle neurons that, prior to 2007, were known only in hominids. In humans, these cells are involved in social conduct, emotions, judgment, and theory of mind. Cetacean spindle neurons are found in areas of the brain that are homologous to where they are found in humans, suggesting that they perform a similar function.

Brain size was previously considered a major indicator of the intelligence of an animal. Since most of the brain is used for maintaining bodily functions, greater ratios of brain to body mass may increase the amount of brain mass available for more complex cognitive tasks. Allometric analysis indicates that mammalian brain size scales at approximately the 2/3 or 3/4 exponent of the body mass. Comparison of a particular animal's brain size with the expected brain size based on such allometric analysis provides an encephalization quotient that can be used as another indication of animal intelligence. Orca have the second largest brain mass of any animal on earth, next to the sperm whale. The brain to body mass ratio in some is second only to humans.

Self-awareness is seen, by some, to be a sign of highly developed, abstract thinking. Self-awareness, though not well-defined scientifically, is believed to be the precursor to more advanced processes like meta-cognitive reasoning (thinking about thinking) that are typical of humans. Research in this field has suggested that cetaceans, among others, possess self-awareness. The most widely used test for self-awareness in animals is the mirror test in which a temporary dye is placed on an animal's body, and the animal is then presented with a mirror; they then see if the animal shows signs of self-recognition.

In 1995, Marten and Psarakos used television to test dolphin self-awareness. They showed dolphins real-time footage of themselves, recorded footage, and another dolphin. They concluded that their evidence suggested self-awareness rather than social behavior. While this particular study has not been repeated since then, dolphins have since passed the mirror test.

== Interactions with humans ==
=== Threats ===
==== Consumption ====
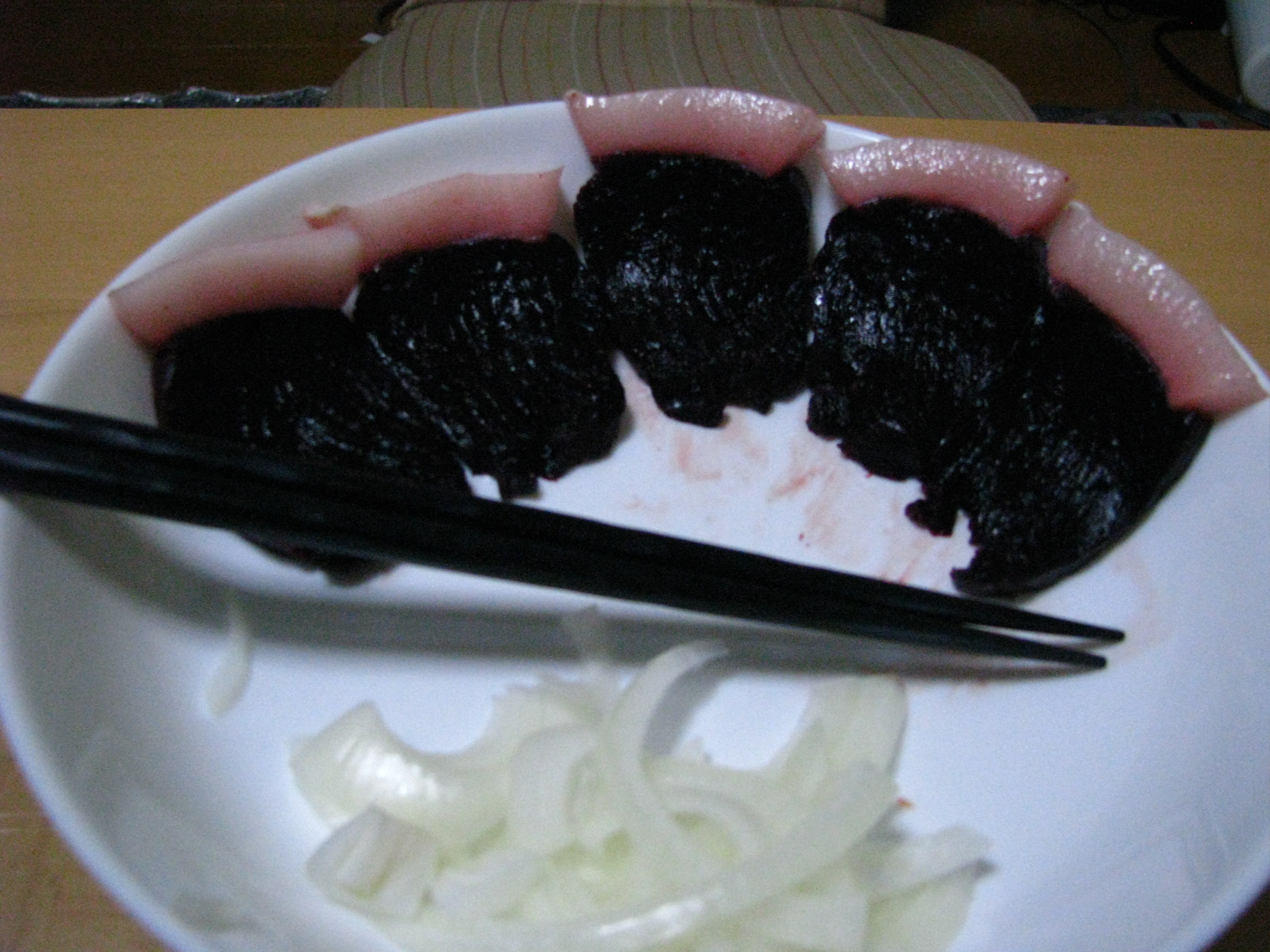
Plate of dolphin sashimi

In some parts of the world, such as Taiji, Japan and the Faroe Islands, dolphins are traditionally considered as food, and are killed in harpoon or drive hunts. Dolphin meat is consumed in a small number of countries worldwide, which include Japan and Peru (where it is referred to as chancho marino, or "sea pork").

Dolphin meat is dense and such a dark shade of red as to appear black. Fat is located in a layer of blubber between the meat and the skin. When dolphin meat is eaten in Japan, it is often cut into thin strips and eaten raw as sashimi, garnished with onion and either horseradish or grated garlic, much as with sashimi of whale or horse meat (basashi). When cooked, dolphin meat is cut into bite-size cubes and then batter-fried or simmered in a miso sauce with vegetables. Cooked dolphin meat has a flavor very similar to beef liver. Dolphin meat is high in mercury, and may pose danger to a humans health when consumed.

The Faroe Islands population was exposed to methylmercury largely from contaminated pilot whale meat, which contained very high levels of about 2 mg methylmercury/kg. However, the Faroe Islands populations also eat significant amounts of fish. The study of about 900 Faroese children showed that prenatal exposure to methylmercury resulted in neuropsychological deficits at 7 years of age

— World Health Organization

There have been human health concerns associated with the consumption of dolphin meat in Japan after tests showed that dolphin meat contained high levels of mercury. There are no known cases of mercury poisoning as a result of consuming dolphin meat, though the government continues to monitor people in areas where dolphin meat consumption is high. The Japanese government recommends that children and pregnant women avoid eating dolphin meat on a regular basis.

Similar concerns exist with the consumption of dolphin meat in the Faroe Islands, where prenatal exposure to methylmercury and PCBs primarily from the consumption of pilot whale meat has resulted in neuropsychological deficits amongst children.

Legally consuming dolphin meat in the United States would be near impossible for most due to the Marine Mammal Protection Act, which forbids "...the act of hunting, killing, capture, and/or harassment of any marine mammal..." (Exceptions are made for certain groups of people, such as Alaska Natives.) Theoretically, one could only eat the meat of a dolphin which died of natural causes, which would likely be highly undesirable (and potentially dangerous).

==== Fishing ====
Various fishing methods, like seine fishing for tuna and the use of drift and gill nets, unintentionally kill many oceanic dolphins. Accidental bycatch in gill nets is common and poses a risk for mainly local dolphin populations.

Dolphin safe labels attempt to reassure consumers that fish and other marine products have been caught in a dolphin-friendly way. The earliest campaigns with "Dolphin safe" labels were initiated in the 1980s as a result of cooperation between marine activists and the major tuna companies, and involved decreasing incidental dolphin kills by up to 50% by changing the type of nets used to catch tuna. The dolphins are netted only while fishermen are in pursuit of smaller tuna. Albacore are not netted this way, making albacore the only truly dolphin-safe tuna.

==== Sonar ====
Loud underwater noises, such as those resulting from naval sonar use, live firing exercises, and certain offshore construction projects such as wind farms, may be harmful to dolphins, increasing stress, damaging hearing, and causing decompression sickness by forcing them to surface too quickly to escape the noise.

=== In captivity ===
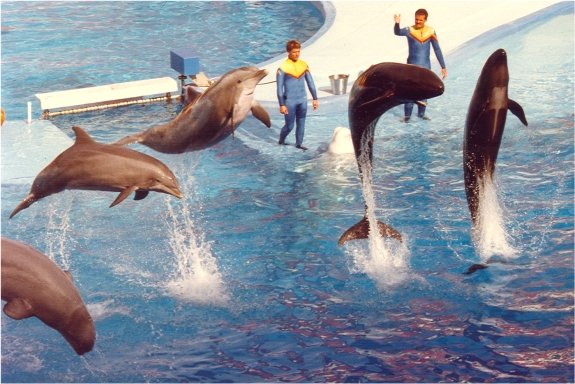
SeaWorld show featuring bottlenose dolphins and false killer whales

The renewed popularity of dolphins in the 1960s resulted in the appearance of many dolphinaria around the world, making dolphins accessible to the public. Criticism and animal welfare laws forced many to close, although hundreds still exist around the world. In the United States, the best known are the SeaWorld marine mammal parks. In the Middle East the best known are Dolphin Bay at Atlantis, The Palm and the Dubai Dolphinarium.

Various species of dolphins are kept in captivity. These small cetaceans are more often than not kept in theme parks, such as SeaWorld, commonly known as a dolphinarium. Bottlenose dolphins are the most common species of dolphin kept in dolphinariums as they are relatively easy to train, have a long lifespan in captivity and have a friendly appearance. Hundreds if not thousands of bottlenose dolphins live in captivity across the world, though exact numbers are hard to determine. Other species kept in captivity are spotted dolphins, false killer whales, and common dolphins, Commerson's dolphins, as well as rough-toothed dolphins, but all in much lower numbers than the bottlenose dolphin. There are also fewer than ten pilot whales, Amazon river dolphins, Risso's dolphins, spinner dolphins, or tucuxi in captivity. Two unusual and very rare hybrid dolphins, known as wholphins, are kept at the Sea Life Park in Hawaii, which is a cross between a bottlenose dolphin and a false killer whale. Also, two common/bottlenose hybrids reside in captivity: one at Discovery Cove and the other at SeaWorld San Diego.

Orca are well known for their performances in shows, but the number of orcas kept in captivity is very small, especially when compared to the number of bottlenose dolphins, with only 44 captive orca being held in aquaria as of 2012. The orca's intelligence, trainability, striking appearance, playfulness in captivity and sheer size have made it a popular exhibit at aquaria and aquatic theme parks. From 1976 to 1997, 55 whales were taken from the wild in Iceland, 19 in Japan and three in Argentina. These figures exclude animals that died during capture. Live captures fell dramatically in the 1990s, and by 1999, about 40% of the 48 animals on display in the world were captive-born.

=== In history and mythology ===
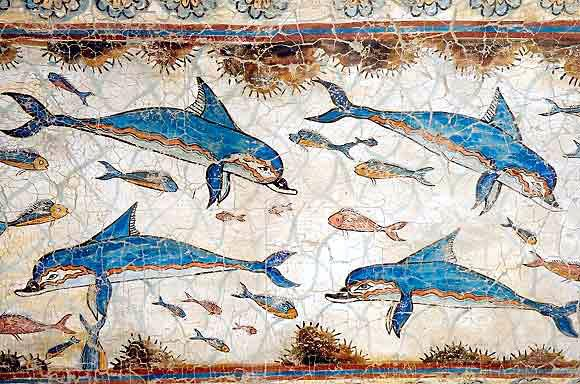
Fresco of dolphins, c. 1600 BC, from Knossos, Crete

In Greek myths, they were seen invariably as helpers of humankind. Dolphins also seem to have been important to the Minoans, judging by artistic evidence from the ruined palace at Knossos. Dolphins are common in Greek mythology, and many coins from ancient Greece have been found which feature a man, a boy or a deity riding on the back of a dolphin. The Ancient Greeks welcomed dolphins; spotting dolphins riding in a ship's wake was considered a good omen. In both ancient and later art, Cupid is often shown riding a dolphin. A dolphin rescued the poet Arion from drowning and carried him safe to land, at Cape Matapan, a promontory forming the southernmost point of the Peloponnesus. There was a temple to Poseidon and a statue of Arion riding the dolphin.

Dionysus was once captured by Etruscan pirates who mistook him for a wealthy prince they could ransom. After the ship set sail Dionysus invoked his divine powers, causing vines to overgrow the ship where the mast and sails had been. He turned the oars into serpents, so terrifying the sailors that they jumped overboard, but Dionysus took pity on them and transformed them into dolphins so that they would spend their lives providing help for those in need. Dolphins were also the messengers of Poseidon and sometimes did errands for him as well. Dolphins were sacred to both Aphrodite and Apollo.

Dolphins are sometimes used as symbols, for instance in heraldry. When heraldry developed in the Middle Ages, not much was known about the biology of the dolphin and it was often depicted as a sort of fish. Traditionally, the dolphins in heraldry still may take after this notion, sometimes showing the dolphin skin covered with fish scales.

In the Middle Ages, the dolphin became an important heraldic element in the coats of arms of several European noble families, the most noticeable being those of the Dauphin de Viennois (later Dauphin of France) through which it passed to the Counts of Forez, Albon and other French families, as well as several branches of the Bourbon family (Count of Montpensier, Count of Beaujolais, among others). The Pandolfini of Florence, and the Delfini of Venice and Rome also used the dolphin as their "canting" armories. In the 19th century, Joseph Bonaparte adopted a dolphin in his coat of arms as King of Naples and Sicily.

In contemporary days, a dolphin is still used in the coat of arms of many cities, as well as in the coat of arms of Anguilla and the coat of arms of Romania, and the coat of arms of Barbados has a dolphin supporter. Cardinal Angelo Amato, prefect of the Congregation of the Causes of Saints, has a dolphin in his coat of arms, as well as Cardinal Godfried Danneels, former Archbishop of Mechelen-Brussels.
