= Sagmatias =

Proposed genus of dolphins

Sagmatias was a genus of dolphins, defined in 1866 by Edward Drinker Cope with Peale's dolphin as type species, described as Sagmatias amblodon. It has been proposed to resurrect the genus to include four species of oceanic dolphins currently classified in the genus Lagenorhynchus. Mitochondrial DNA studies have indicated that Pacific white-sided dolphin, Peale's dolphin, dusky dolphin and hourglass dolphin are more closely related to dolphins in the Lissodelphininae subfamily, than to the two other members of the genus: Atlantic white-sided dolphin and white-beaked dolphin. This phylogenetic relationship is further supported by cladistic analysis of morphological characters. However, resurrection of the genus Sagmatias has not been accepted by the Society for Marine Mammalogy's taxonomic Committee, because the finer details of the phylogenetic relationships between the four species in the proposed Sagmatias genus and the four species of dolphins in the genus Cephalorhynchus remains to be resolved. Genetic and bioacoustical evidence suggest that Peale's dolphin and hourglass dolphin are closer related to the Cephalorhynchus species than to the Pacific white-sided dolphin and dusky dolphin, which, if true, would make the genus Sagmatias paraphyletic.

Examples of different phylogenetic trees
Pichler et al (2001)
May-Collardo and Agnarsson (2006)

- Lissodelphininae
  - Lissodelphis
    - L. peronii
    - L. borealis
  - - Sagmatias
      - - S. obscurus
        - S. obliquidens
      - - S. australis
        - S. cruciger
    - Cephalorhynchus
      - C. heavisidii
      - - C. hectori
        - - C. commersonii
          - C. eutropia

- Lissodelphininae
  - Lissodelphis
    - L. peronii
    - L. borealis
  - - - - S. obscurus
        - S. obliquidens
      - - - - S. australis
            - S. cruciger
          - Cephalorhynchus
            - C. heavisidii
            - - C. hectori
              - - C. commersonii
                - C. eutropia

Phylogenetic tree where Sagmatias forms a monophyletic sister group to Cephalorhynchus
Phylogenetic tree where Sagmatias does not form a monophyletic group
