= List of mammals of Antarctica =

The following is a list of native wild mammal species recorded in Antarctica. There are 23 mammal species in Antarctica, all of which are marine. Three are considered endangered, one is vulnerable, eight are listed as data deficient, and one has not yet been evaluated. Domesticated species, such as the dogs formerly present, are not included.

The following tags are used to highlight each species' conservation status as assessed by the International Union for Conservation of Nature; those on the left are used here, those in the second column in some other articles:

EX	Extinct	No reasonable doubt that the last individual has died.
EW	Extinct in the wild	Known only to survive in captivity or as a naturalized population well outside its historic range.
CR	Critically endangered	The species is in imminent danger of extinction in the wild.
EN	Endangered	The species is facing a very high risk of extinction in the wild.
VU	Vulnerable	The species is facing a high risk of extinction in the wild.
NT	Near threatened	The species does not qualify as being at high risk of extinction but is likely to do so in the future.
LC	Least concern	The species is not currently at risk of extinction in the wild.
DD	Data deficient	There is inadequate information to assess the risk of extinction for this species.
NE	Not evaluated	The conservation status of the species has not been studied.

== Order: Carnivora (carnivorans) ==
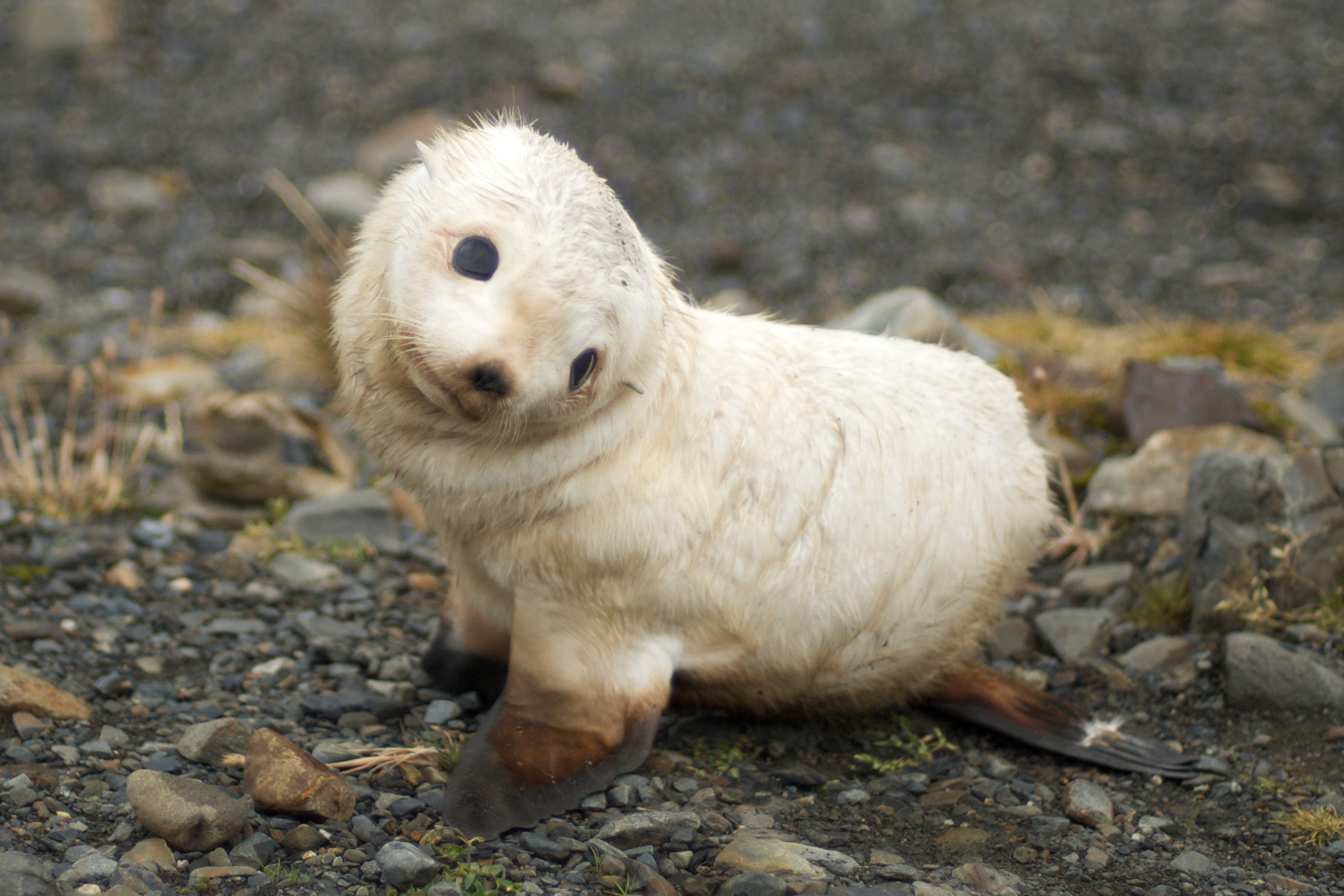
Infant Antarctic fur seal

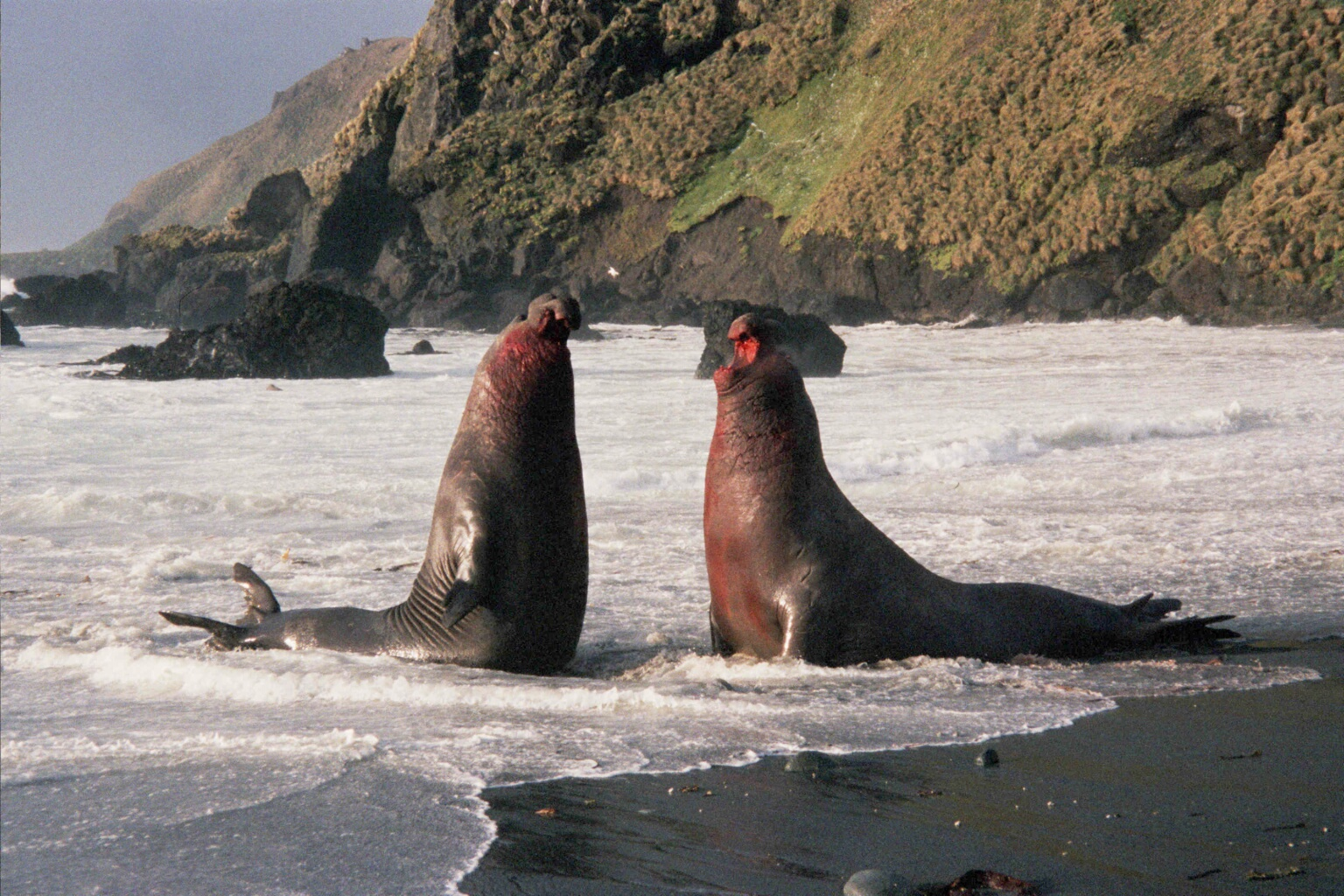
Bull southern elephant seals

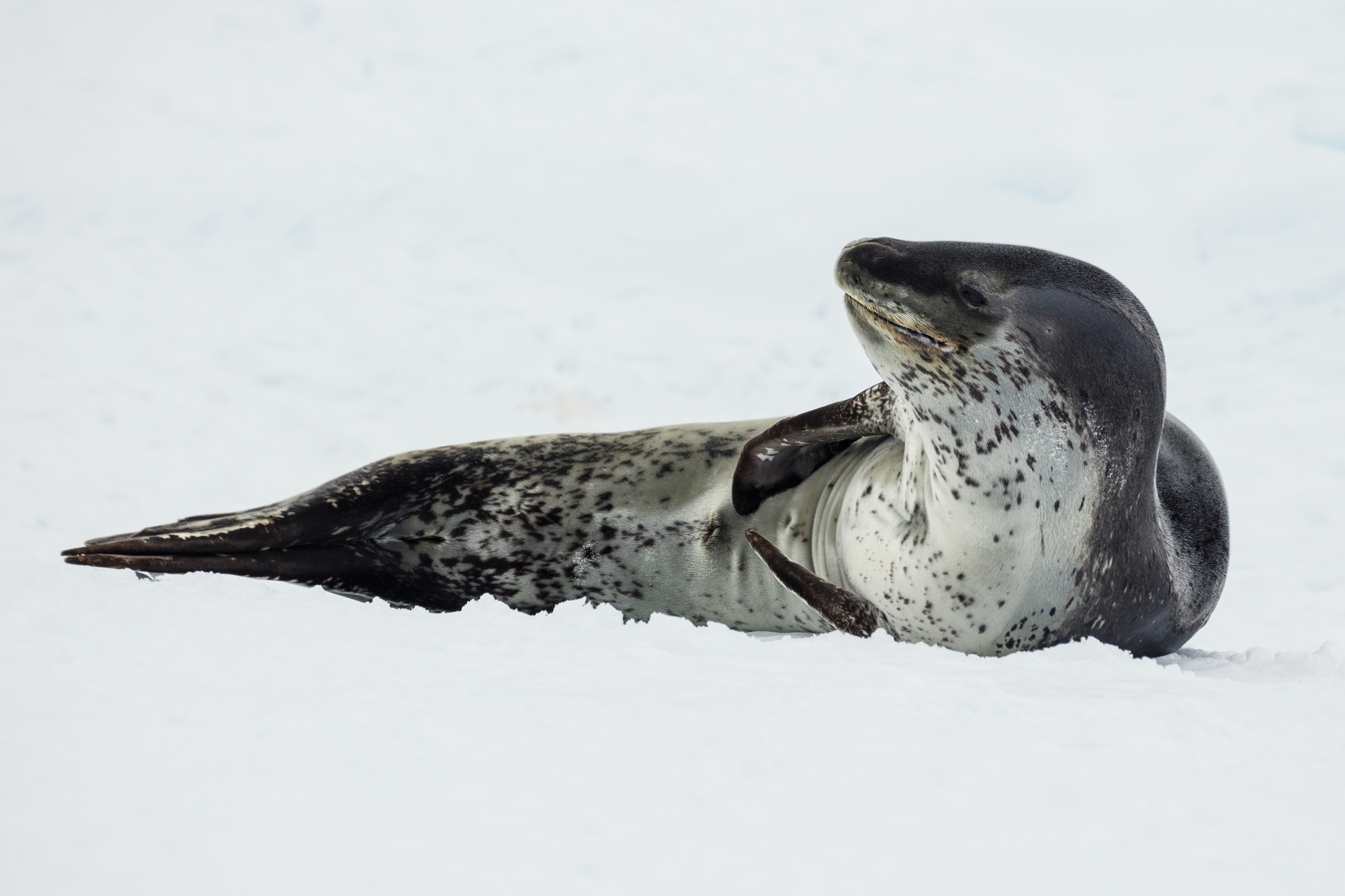
Leopard seal

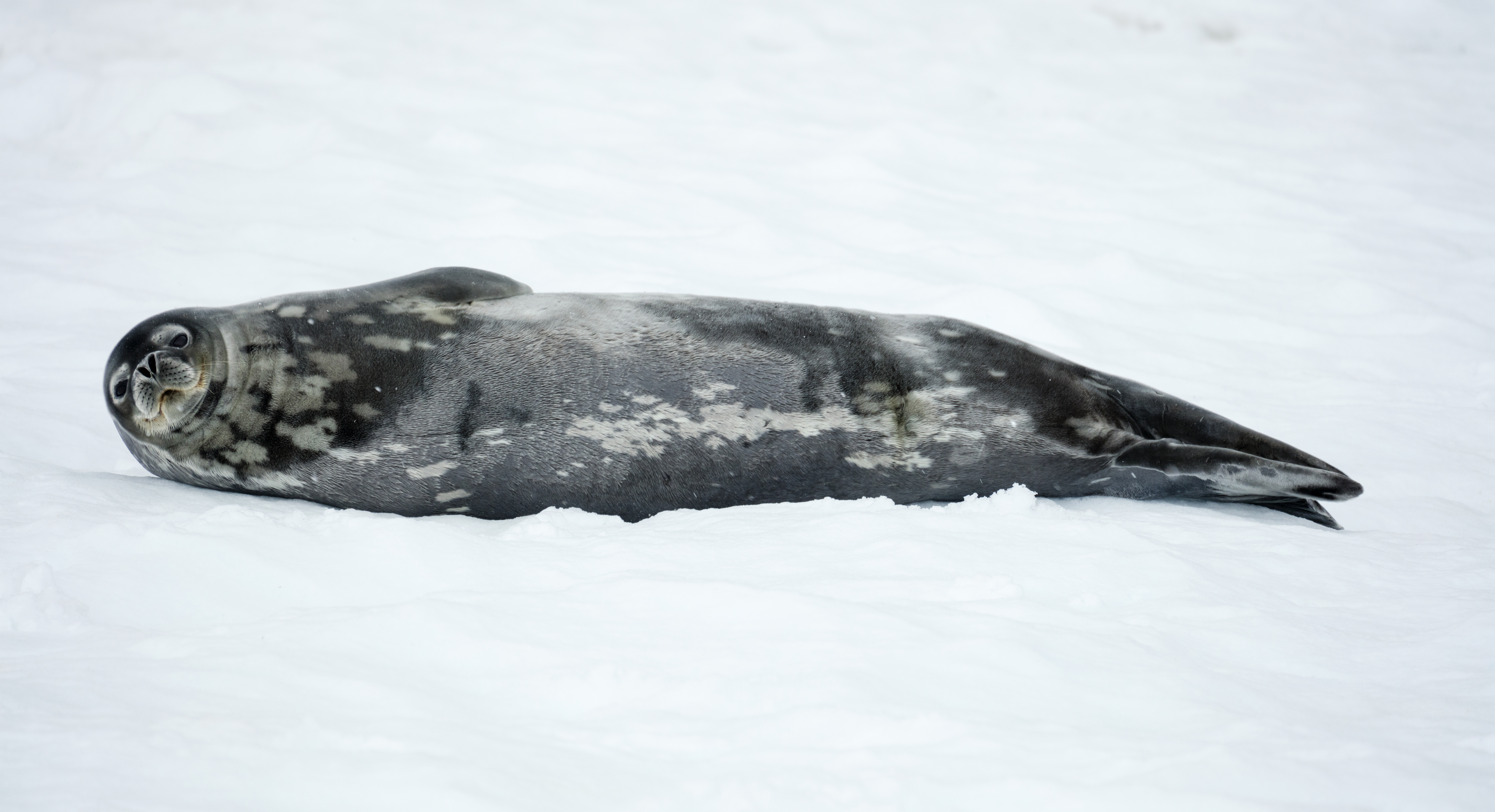
Weddell seal

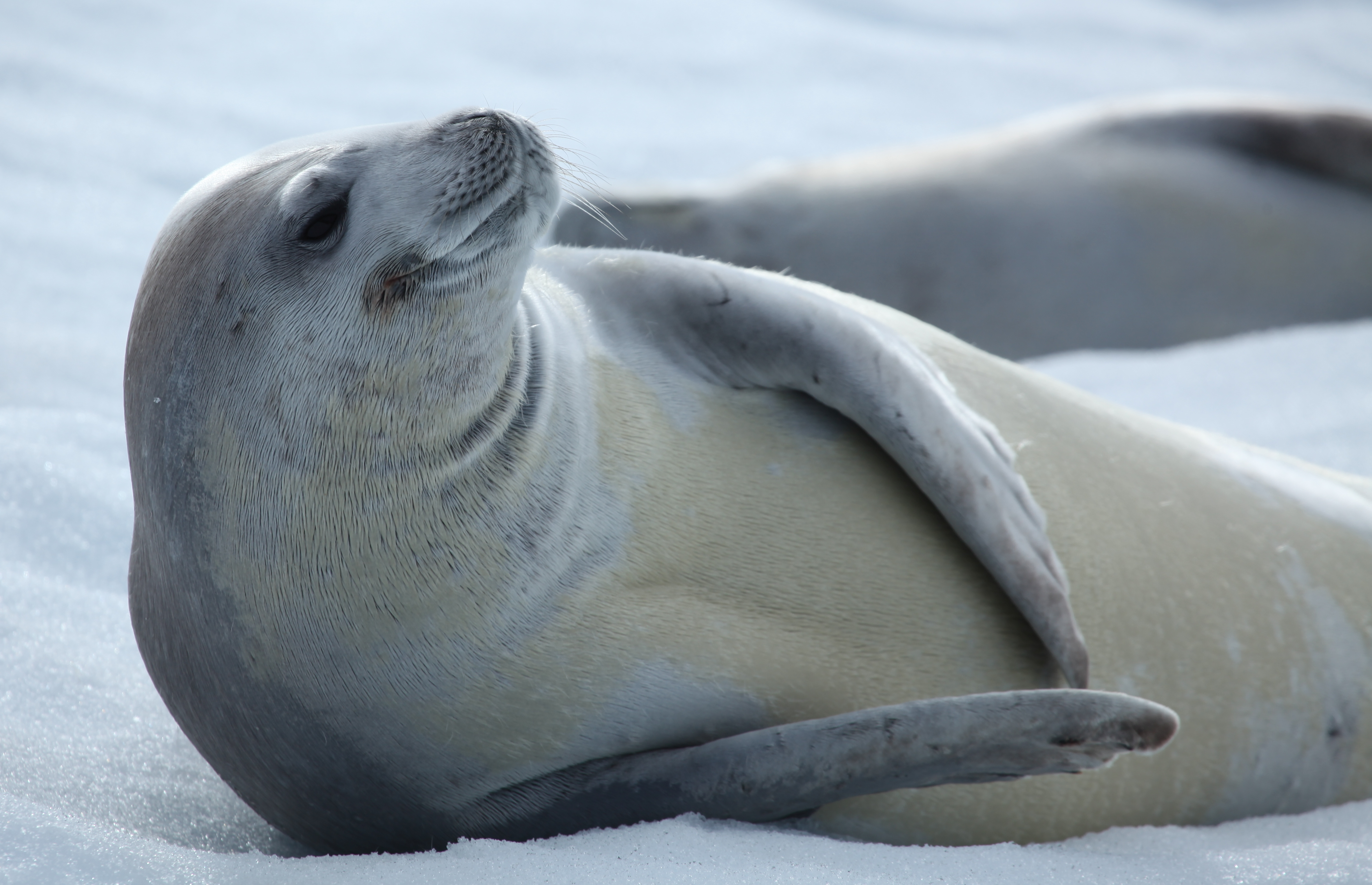
Crabeater seal

There are over 260 species of carnivorans, the majority of which feed primarily on meat. They have a characteristic skull shape and dentition. The southern elephant seal is believed to be the largest carnivoran of all time; bulls typically weigh 2,200 to 4,000 kilograms (4,900 to 8,800 pounds). The lobodontine seals comprise about 80% of the global biomass of pinnipeds, a reflection of the high productivity of the Southern Ocean; all have circumpolar distributions surrounding Antarctica and breed on pack ice or shore-fast ice. Antarctic fur seals and southern elephant seals, in contrast, while doing much of their feeding at the edge of the continent, breed on subantarctic islands, such as South Georgia. Warmblooded prey makes up a significant proportion of the leopard seal's diet, and is occasionally taken by Antarctic fur seals.

- Suborder: Caniformia
  - Clade Pinnipedia (seals, sea lions and walruses)
    - Family: Otariidae (eared seals)
      - Genus: Arctocephalus
        - Antarctic fur seal, A. gazella LC
    - Family: Phocidae (earless seals)
      - Genus: Mirounga
        - Southern elephant seal, M. leonina LC
      - Tribe Lobodontini (Antarctic seals)
        - Genus: Hydrurga
          - Leopard seal, Hydrurga leptonyx LC
        - Genus: Leptonychotes
          - Weddell seal, Leptonychotes weddellii LC
        - Genus: Lobodon
          - Crabeater seal, Lobodon carcinophaga LC
        - Genus: Ommatophoca
          - Ross seal, Ommatophoca rossii LC

== Order: Artiodactyla (artiodactyls) ==
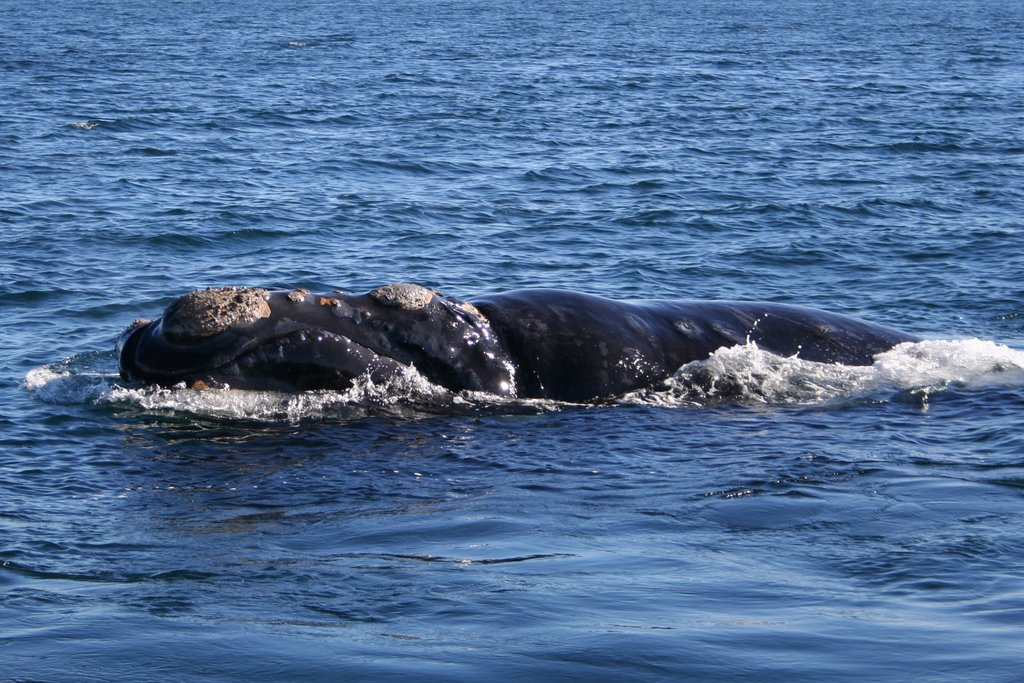
Southern right whale

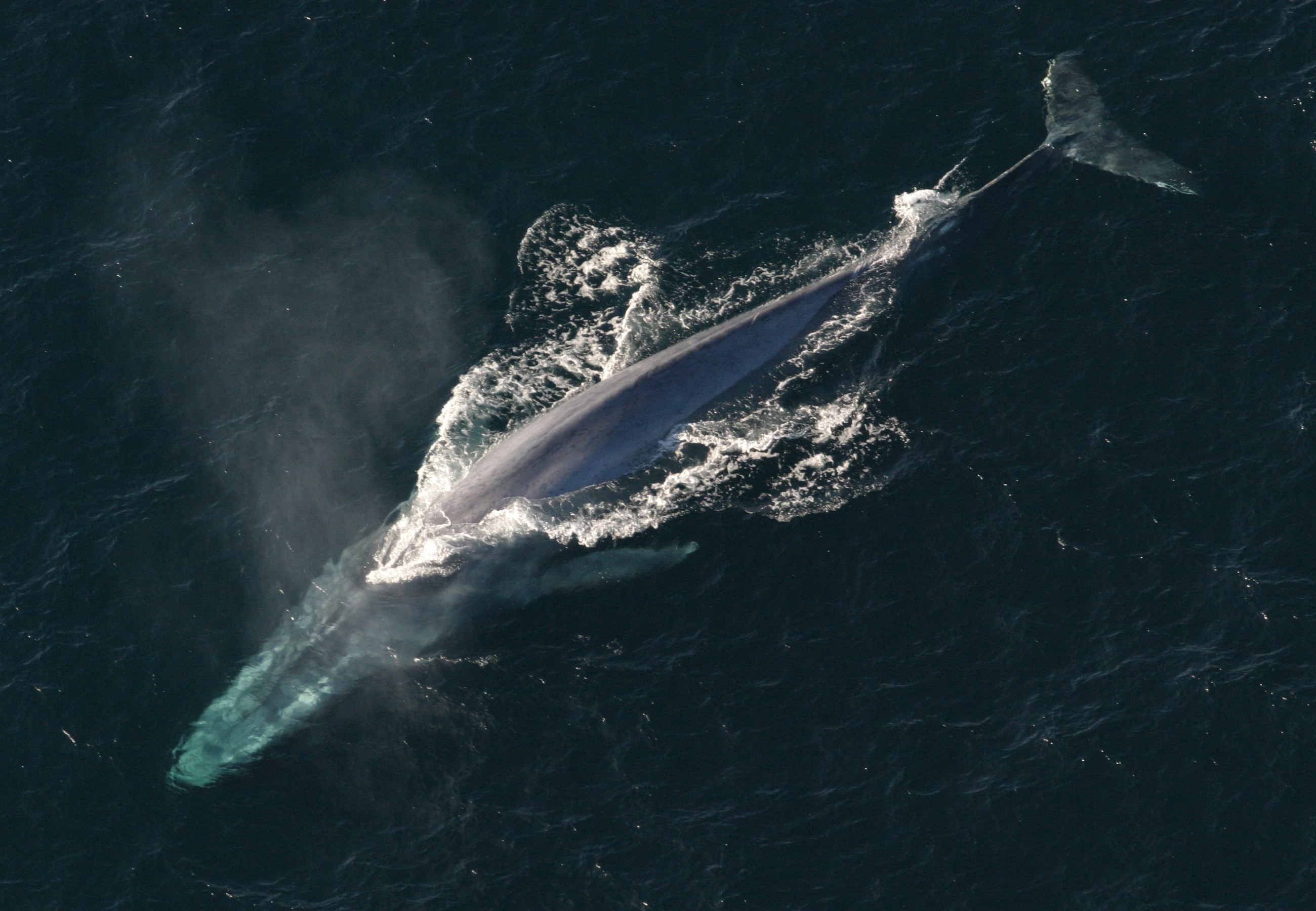
Blue whale

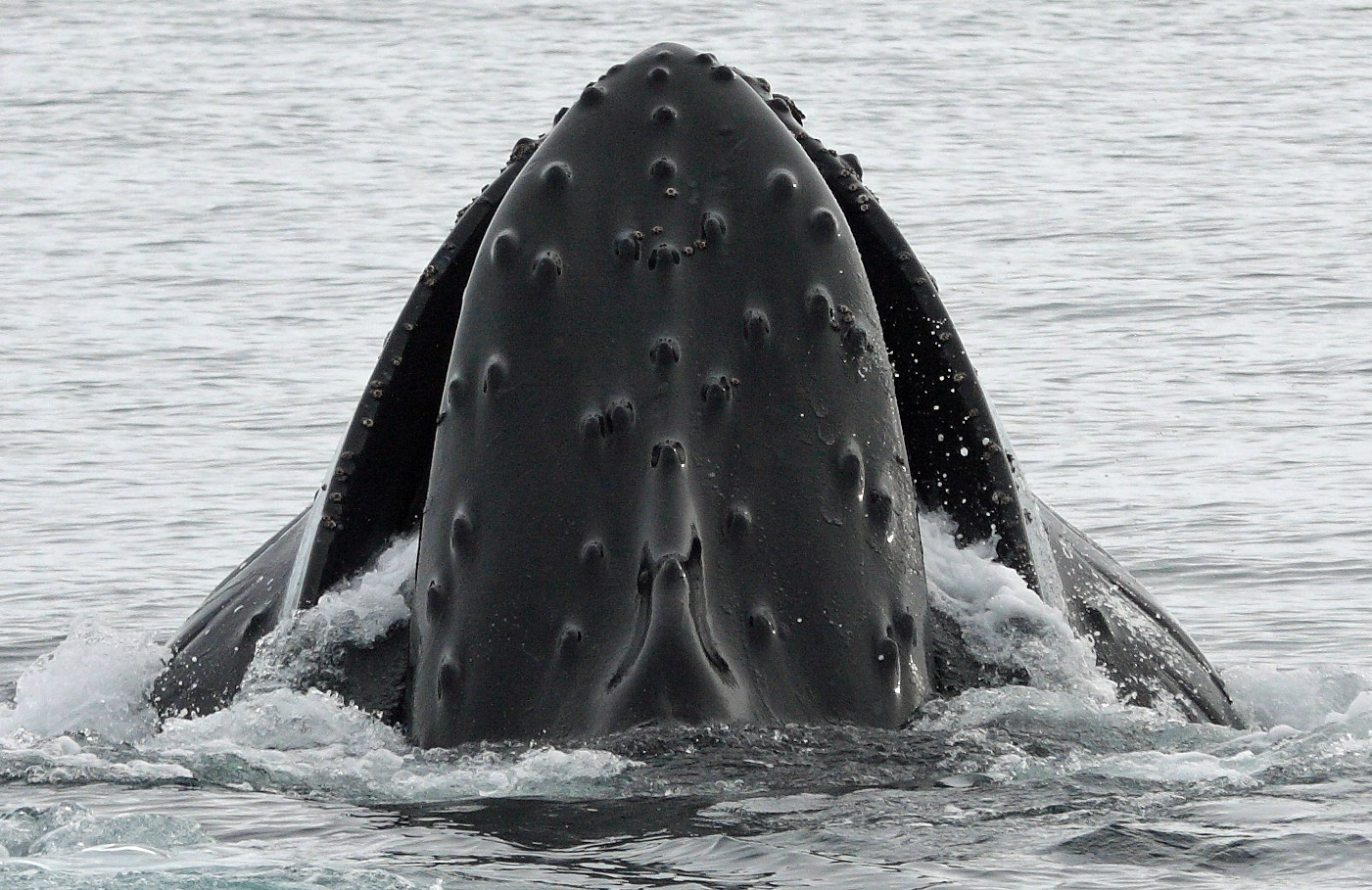
Humpback whale lunge feeding in Fournier Bay

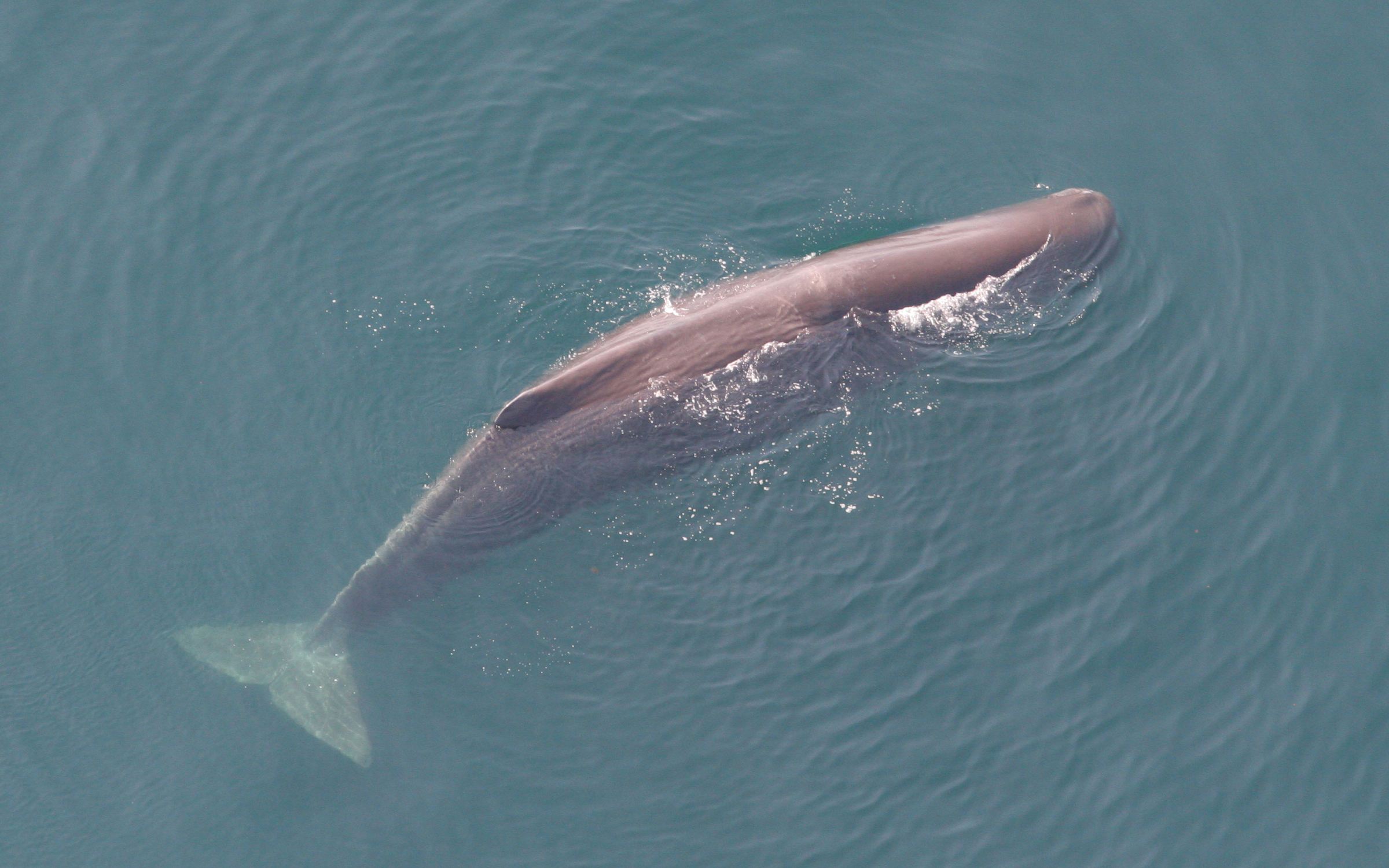
Sperm whale

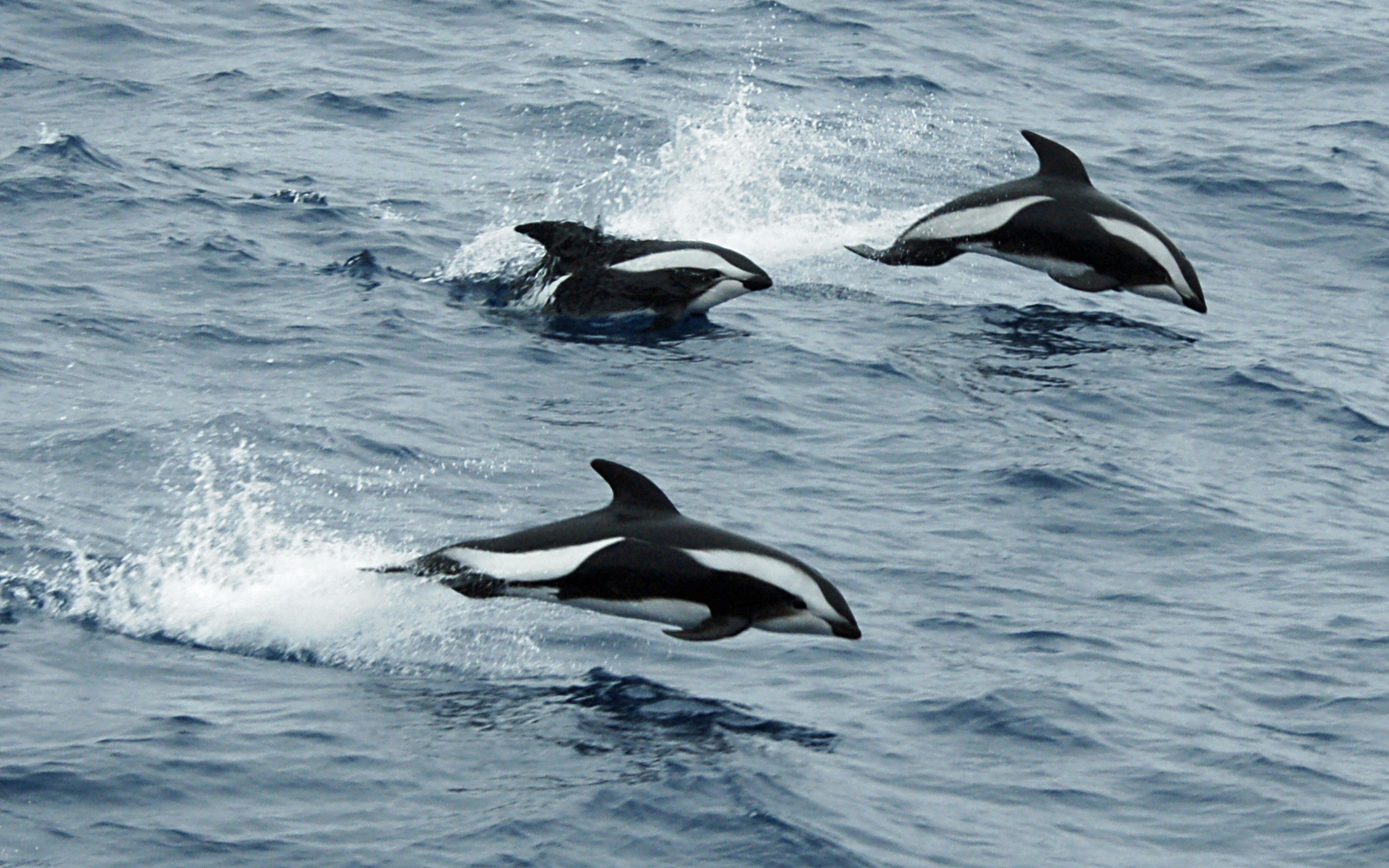
Hourglass dolphin

Orca

All artiodactyls in Antarctica belong to the infraorder Cetacea, which includes whales, dolphins and porpoises. They are the mammals most fully adapted to aquatic life with a spindle-shaped nearly hairless body, protected by a thick layer of blubber, and forelimbs and tail modified to provide propulsion underwater. Their closest extant relatives are the hippos, which are artiodactyls, from which cetaceans descended; cetaceans are thus also artiodactyls.

The hunting of baleen whales in the vicinity of Antarctica began around 1904, with the establishment of a whaling station on South Georgia. Hunting of blue whales was banned in 1966, and finally brought under control in the 1970s. By that time the blue whale population had been reduced to 0.15% of its original size. Whaling for other species in the Southern Hemisphere was banned in 1976. Numbers have recovered somewhat since, but the largest species remain endangered.

- Parvorder: Mysticeti
  - Family: Balaenidae
    - Genus: Eubalaena
      - Southern right whale, E. australis LC
  - Family: Neobalaenidae
    - Genus: Caperea
      - Pygmy right whale, C. marginata LC
  - Family: Balaenopteridae
    - Subfamily: Balaenopterinae
      - Genus: Balaenoptera
        - Common minke whale, Balaenoptera acutorostrata LC
        - Antarctic minke whale, Balaenoptera bonaerensis NT
        - Sei whale, Balaenoptera borealis EN
          - Southern sei whale, B. b. schlegelii
        - Blue whale, Balaenoptera musculus EN
          - Southern blue whale, B. m. intermedia
        - Fin whale, Balaenoptera physalus VU
          - Southern fin whale, B. p. quoyi
    - Subfamily: Megapterinae
      - Genus: Megaptera
        - Humpback whale, Megaptera novaeangliae LC
- Parvorder: Odontoceti
  - Family: Physeteridae
    - Genus: Physeter
      - Sperm whale, Physeter macrocephalus VU
  - Family: Ziphidae
    - Genus: Berardius
      - Arnoux's beaked whale, Berardius arnuxii LC
    - Genus: Mesoplodon
      - Gray's beaked whale, Mesoplodon grayi LC
    - Genus: Hyperoodon
      - Southern bottlenose whale, Hyperoodon planifrons LC
  - Superfamily: Delphinoidea
    - Family: Phocoenidae
      - Genus: Phocoena
        - Spectacled porpoise, Phocoena dioptrica LC
    - Family: Delphinidae (marine dolphins)
      - Genus: Cephalorhynchus
        - Commerson's dolphin, Cephalorhynchus commersonii LC
      - Genus: Globicephala
        - Long-finned pilot whale, Globicephala melas LC
      - Genus: Lagenorhynchus
        - Hourglass dolphin, Lagenorhynchus cruciger LC
      - Genus: Orcinus
        - Orca, Orcinus orca DD

== See also ==
- List of chordate orders
- List of mammals of South America
- Lists of mammals by region
- List of prehistoric mammals
- Mammal classification
- List of mammals described in the 2000s
