= List of mammals of French Southern Territories =

This is a list of the mammal species recorded in French Southern Territories. There are nineteen mammal species in French Southern Territories, of which two are endangered.

The following tags are used to highlight each species' conservation status as assessed by the International Union for Conservation of Nature:

EX	Extinct	No reasonable doubt that the last individual has died.
EW	Extinct in the wild	Known only to survive in captivity or as a naturalized populations well outside its previous range.
CR	Critically endangered	The species is in imminent risk of extinction in the wild.
EN	Endangered	The species is facing an extremely high risk of extinction in the wild.
VU	Vulnerable	The species is facing a high risk of extinction in the wild.
NT	Near threatened	The species does not meet any of the criteria that would categorise it as risking extinction but it is likely to do so in the future.
LC	Least concern	There are no current identifiable risks to the species.
DD	Data deficient	There is inadequate information to make an assessment of the risks to this species.

== Order: Cetacea (whales) ==
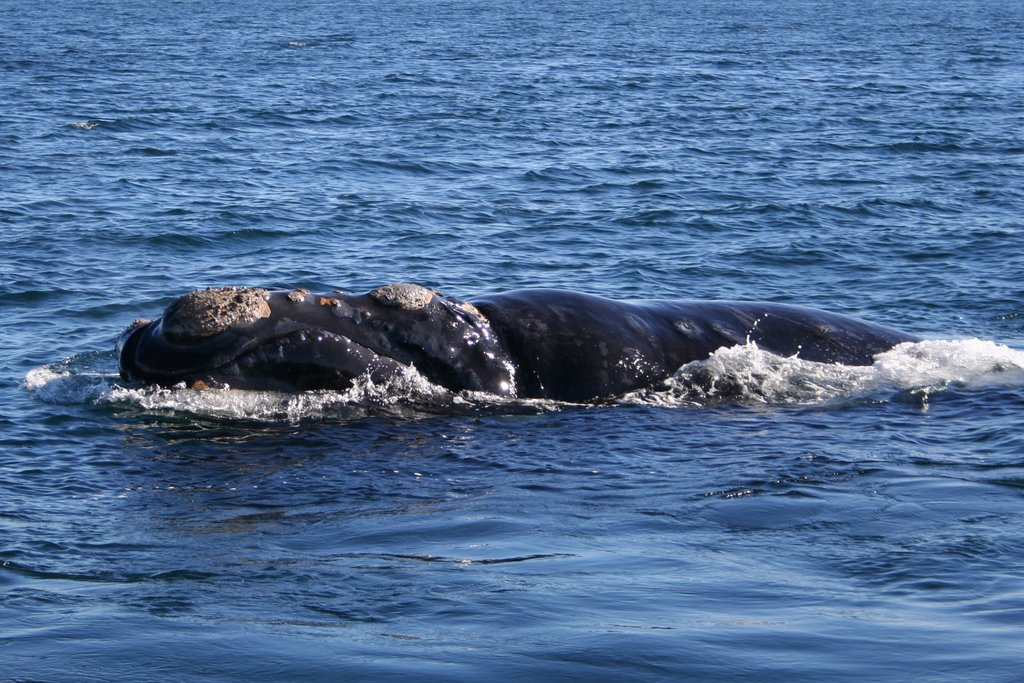
Southern right whale

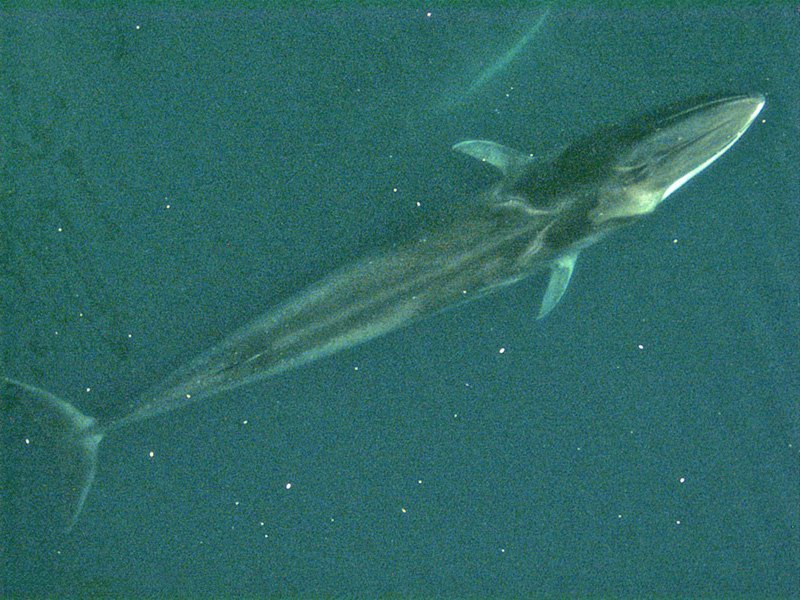
Fin whale

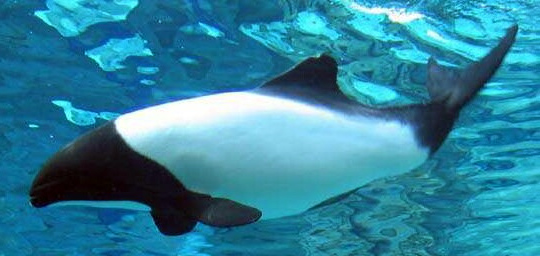
Commerson's dolphin

The order Cetacea includes whales, dolphins and porpoises. They are the mammals most fully adapted to aquatic life with a spindle-shaped nearly hairless body, protected by a thick layer of blubber, and forelimbs and tail modified to provide propulsion underwater.

- Suborder: Mysticeti
  - Family: Balaenidae
    - Genus: Eubalaena
      - Southern right whale, Eubalaena australis LC^{IUCN}
  - Family: Balaenopteridae
    - Subfamily: Balaenopterinae
      - Genus: Balaenoptera
        - Blue whale, Balaenoptera musculus EN^{IUCN} (globally)
          - Antarctic sub-species Balaenoptera intermedia CR^{IUCN}
        - Fin whale, Balaenoptera physalus VU^{IUCN}
  - Family: Neobalaenidae
    - Genus: Caperea
      - Pygmy right whale, Caperea marginata LC^{IUCN}
- Suborder: Odontoceti
  - Superfamily: Platanistoidea
    - Family: Phocoenidae
      - Genus: Phocoena
        - Spectacled porpoise, Phocoena dioptrica LC^{IUCN}
    - Family: Ziphidae
      - Genus: Berardius
        - Giant beaked whale, Berardius arnuxii LC^{IUCN}
      - Subfamily: Hyperoodontinae
        - Genus: Mesoplodon
          - Gray's beaked whale, Mesoplodon grayi LC^{IUCN}
          - Layard's beaked whale, Mesoplodon layardii LC^{IUCN}
    - Family: Delphinidae (marine dolphins)
      - Genus: Cephalorhynchus
        - Commerson's dolphin, Cephalorhynchus commersonii LC^{IUCN}
      - Genus: Lissodelphis
        - Southern right whale dolphin, Lissodelphis peronii LC^{IUCN}
      - Genus: Sagmatias
        - Dusky dolphin, Sagmatias obscurus LC^{IUCN}
      - Genus: Orcinus
        - Orca, Orcinus orca DD^{IUCN}
      - Genus: Globicephala
        - Pilot whale, Globicephala melas LC^{IUCN}

== Order: Carnivora (carnivorans) ==
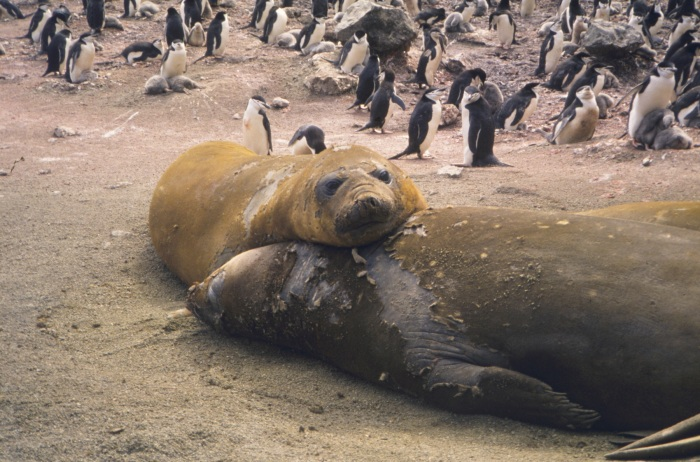
Southern elephant seal

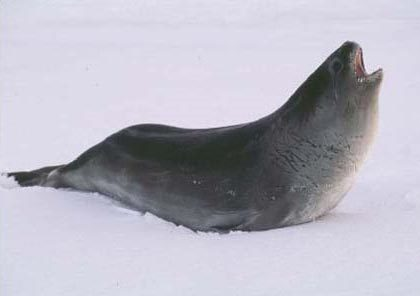
Ross seal

There are over 260 species of carnivorans, the majority of which feed primarily on meat. They have a characteristic skull shape and dentition.

- Suborder: Caniformia
  - Family: Otariidae (eared seals, sea lions)
    - Genus: Arctophoca
      - Antarctic fur seal, Arctophoca gazella LC^{IUCN}
      - Subantarctic fur seal, Arctophoca tropicalis LC^{IUCN}
  - Family: Phocidae (earless seals)
    - Genus: Hydrurga
      - Leopard seal, Hydrurga leptonyx LC^{IUCN}
    - Genus: Leptonychotes
      - Weddell seal, Leptonychotes weddellii LC^{IUCN}
    - Genus: Mirounga
      - Southern elephant seal, Mirounga leonina LC^{IUCN}
    - Genus: Ommatophoca
      - Ross seal, Ommatophoca rossii LC^{IUCN}

== See also ==
- List of chordate orders
- List of mammals described in the 2000s
- List of prehistoric mammals
- Lists of mammals by region
- Mammal classification
