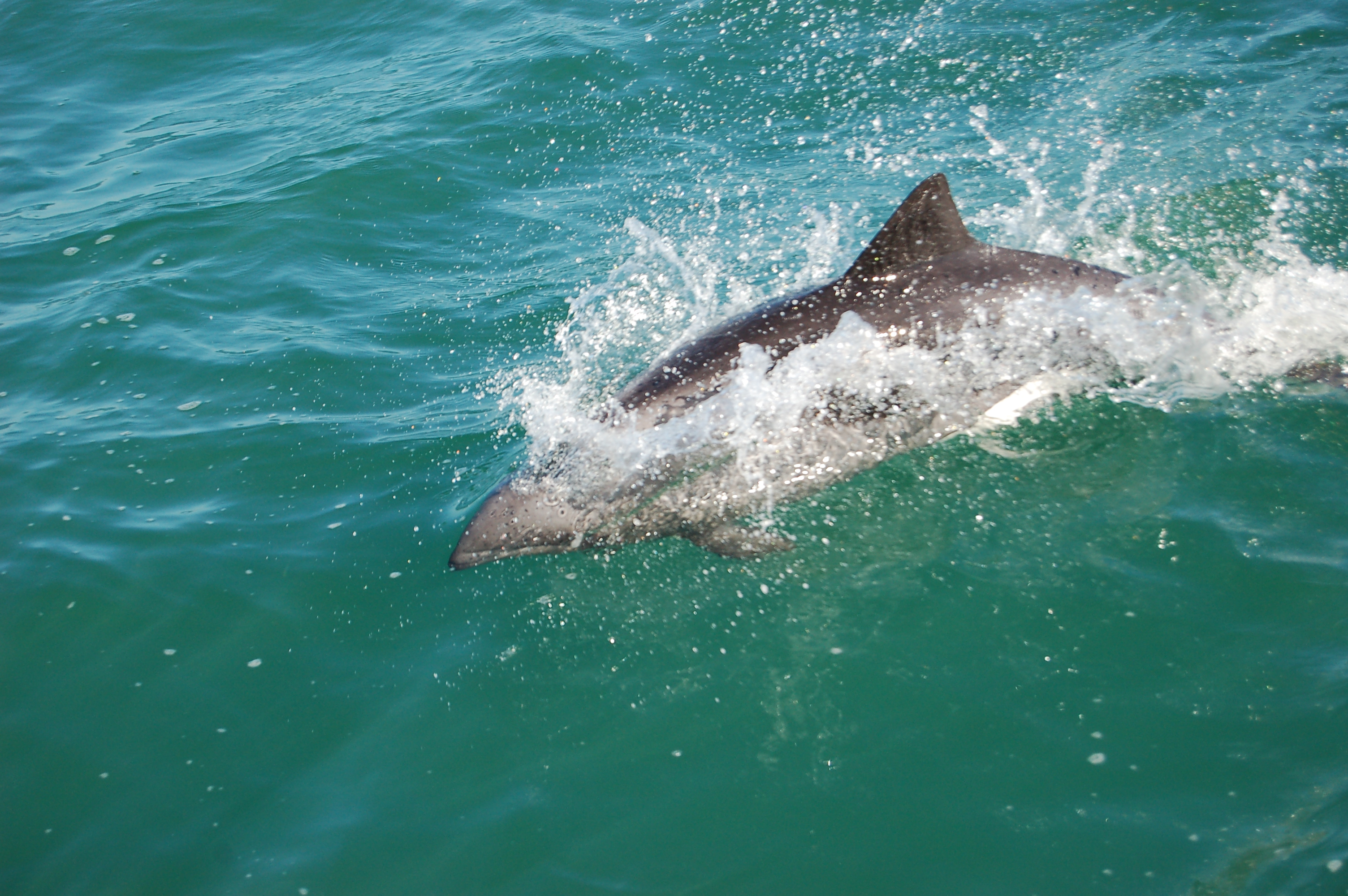
- Heaviside's dolphin off Lüderitz, Namibia
- Size compared to an average human

Conservation status
- Near Threatened (IUCN 3.1)
- CITES Appendix II

Scientific classification
- Kingdom: Animalia
- Phylum: Chordata
- Class: Mammalia
- Order: Artiodactyla
- Infraorder: Cetacea
- Family: Delphinidae
- Genus: Cephalorhynchus
- Species: C. heavisidii

Binomial name
- Cephalorhynchus heavisidii J. E. Gray, 1828
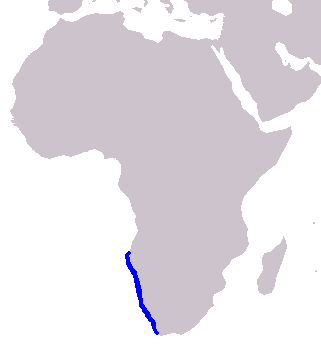
- Heaviside's dolphin range

= Heaviside's dolphin =

Species of mammal

Heaviside's dolphin (Cephalorhynchus heavisidii) is one of six dolphins in the genus Cephalorhynchus. The small cetacean is endemic to the Benguela ecosystem along the southwest coast of Africa.

== Taxonomy and evolution ==
=== Nomenclature ===
Early in the 19th century, a specimen was caught off the Cape of Good Hope and brought to the United Kingdom by a Captain Haviside of the British East India Company. Zoologist John Edward Gray, who described the species in his Spicilegia Zoologica, misidentified Haviside as the surgeon John Heaviside, who was known for his own biological collections at the time. "Heaviside's dolphin" is the recognised common name, though amongst others, "Haviside's dolphin" and "Benguela dolphin" are also used, the latter especially in Namibia.

The genus name "Cephalorhynchus" comes from the Greek kephale for 'head' and rhynchos for 'beak'. For the species name "heavisidii" see the above description.

=== Closely related species and genetic origin ===
The three other species in the genus Cephalorhynchus are the Chilean dolphin (C. eutropia), the Commerson's dolphin (C. commersonii) and the Hector's dolphin (C. hectori). All are located in cool temperate shelf waters in the Southern Hemisphere.

Genetic studies suggest that the Cephalorhynchus dolphins originated from a single common ancestor in Southern Africa, and that Heaviside's dolphin is the sister species to all other species in the genus. Radiation around the southern hemisphere following the Antarctic Circumpolar Current (otherwise known as the West Wind Drift), first to New Zealand and then to South America, is thought to have led to the subsequent speciation within the genus.

== Description ==
=== Morphology ===
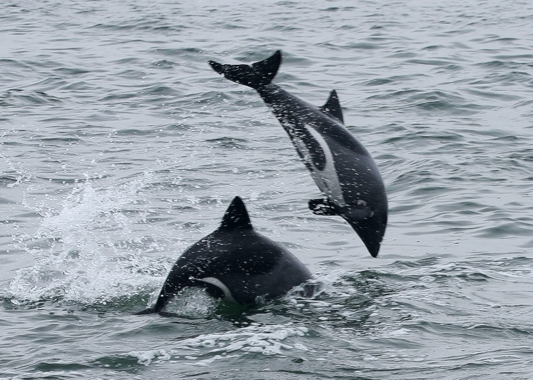
Heaviside's dolphins off Walvis Bay, Namibia

Heaviside's are small and stocky with adults reaching a maximum length and weight of 1.7 m (5.6 ft) and 75 kg (165 lb) respectively. The dolphin has a distinct black, grey and white body pattern, and is not easily confused with any other species in its range. The head is cone shaped with a blunt beak. The dorsal fin is triangular in shape and centred in the middle of the back. The head and thorax are coloured light grey with darker patches around the eye. The dorsal fin, fluke and dorsal cape are a dark grey to almost black with a band that extends forward from the dorsal fin to the blowhole. The underbelly is white, with bands that extend onto the lower rear of the body. Small white patches are located just behind the pectoral fins and a single white patch extends between these fins on the chest. Sexual dimorphism is minimal, however variation in the shape of the white patch covering the genital slit is distinct between genders. In males, the patch ends in a point, but in females widens out to cover the mammary slits.

=== Life history ===
Information on reproduction is limited for Heaviside's dolphins, however they are thought to be comparable to Hector's and Commerson's dolphins. Females and males reach sexual maturity approximately between 5–9 years. Mating is thought to occur year-round, however individual females may only produce calves every 2–4 years. Gestation time is unknown. Maximum known lifespan is based on the oldest recorded individual at 26 years old.

=== Group size ===
Typically occurs in small groups of 2–3, but numbers of 1–10 are frequent and large aggregations of ~100 individuals or more are known to form in high density areas. Nursery groups (exclusively females and calves) are not formed in this species.

=== Predation ===
Levels of predation are unknown; however, killer whales (Orcinus orca) are known predators and there is evidence of shark attack from body scars.

== Distribution ==
=== Geographic range ===
The species is strongly associated with the cool waters of the Benguela Ecosystem. Although the southern limit of the range is defined as Cape Point, the real southern limit beyond which sightings are extremely rare is Hout Bay, some 40 km (25 mi) to the north (a considerable distance for a species which shows very high site fidelity to quite small spatial scales when nearshore). The species occurs more or less continuously for 2,500 km (1,600 mi) to the north of this along the South African coast, through Namibia and into southern Angola where the northern boundary for the species remains poorly defined. Several dolphins have been sighted or accidentally caught by fishing vessels north of the Angola–Namibia border, but no sightings were reported during a series of coastal scientific surveys at Tombua which is approximately 170 km into Angola but well south of the defined northern boundary of the Benguela Ecosystem. The northern boundary of the Benguela current shifts north and south seasonally and as Heaviside's dolphins appear closely linked to its cool waters, their northern range limit may shift along with water conditions. Systematic surveys have dedicated effort to describing the distribution in southern South Africa and current research efforts focus on local populations in Walvis Bay and Lüderitz, Namibia. These locations are also popular hotspots for watching these dolphins in addition to Table Bay (Cape Town) and Britannia Bay, South Africa. Sightings are common from land and there are several dolphin watching tour companies by which Heaviside's dolphins can be seen by boat.

Recent genetic research has demonstrated evidence of population structure across the range, indicating two metapopulations (north and south) with limited genetic exchange. This pattern of fragmentation is a common feature amongst the other three species in the genus Cephalorhynchus and most prevalent in the Hector's dolphin, which displays genetic isolation over very short distances.

=== Habitat preferences ===
Heaviside's dolphins typically remain nearshore in the mornings where they typically socialise and rest. When nearshore their distribution patterns are remarkably predictable within and between years, with the animals showing highly consistent use of aggregation sites at the exposed western tips of most bays throughout South Africa and Namibia, but they are rarely seen in the protected shallows of these bays. Outside of bays, they show relatively high densities along exposed sandy beaches, but these may be a secondary choice after a preference for areas where there is a high abundance of their main prey item; juvenile hake (Merluccius capensis) in adjacent offshore waters. Most commonly sighted within sea surface temperatures of 9 to 15 °C (48 to 59 °F) and depths less than 100 metres (330 ft).

== Behaviour ==
Heaviside's dolphins are energetic and social animals, especially when nearshore in the mornings. Behaviour when offshore tends to be less playful and may include a rest phase when moving offshore to feed. They are attracted to boats and frequently bow-ride. Individuals can also be seen surfing in coastal waves. Iconic vertical leaps clear the water before re-entering headfirst with almost no splash. Heaviside's dolphins use echolocation to find and capture prey. Mating typically occurs in social groups of 3–7 individuals which remain in a small area exhibiting extensive rolling, touching and position changes with frequent leaps by one of pairs of animals which potentially serve a competitive function.

=== Diet and Foraging ===
Prey items consist of mostly demersal fish and cephalopod species, predominantly juvenile hake (Merluccius capensis) and octopus, however pelagic species such as juvenile goby (Sufflogobius bibarbatus) and horse mackerel (Trachurus trachurus capensis) are also consumed especially in Namibia. Foraging occurs mostly at the seabed, in shallow depths. Feeding nearshore is rarely observed.

=== Movement patterns ===
A diurnal movement pattern is present in South Africa, whereby the dolphins move offshore in the afternoon to feed on prey rising vertically to the surface at night. Movement inshore to rest and socialise occurs in the morning. However, the pattern is different in Luderitz and Walvis Bay, Namibia where the movement is less pronounced and dolphins appear to stay inshore during the night, which is likely associated with foraging on different prey.

=== Home range and site fidelity ===
Heaviside's have small home ranges of 50–80 km (31–50 mi) as measured using satellite telemetry over 2–3 months and photographic resightings over up to 3 years. Some individuals have been resighted at the same location for up to 10 years.

=== Dive time and depth ===
There has been limited research into Heaviside's diving behaviour, however a study of two dolphins fitted with satellite tags was undertaken in South Africa in 1997. The maximum dive depth recorded was 147 meters; however, the majority of dives were less than 50 meters. Dive duration were predominantly less than 2 minutes with most dives between 0 and 1 minutes (Davis et al. 2014).

=== Sympatry with other delphinids ===
Whilst typically found further from shore, dusky dolphins (Lagenorhynchus obscurus) are found throughout the range and occasionally both dolphin species are sighted in mixed groups. Where both species overlap in prey selection, Heaviside's take larger prey items, potentially because they are outcompeted by the larger dusky dolphins for their preferred, smaller sized prey. In central Namibia (especially Walvis Bay) Heaviside's dolphins overlap with a small populations of fewer than 100 common bottlenose dolphins REF. The bottlenose dolphin population use only water less than 15m depth while in this area Heaviside's dolphins are almost always encounteres in water deeper than 20 m (66 ft), suggesting some form of competitive exclusion.

=== Vocalisations ===
As is the case with all species in the genus, Heaviside's dolphins produce narrow-band high-frequency (NBHF) echolocation clicks (centred around 125–130 kHz), and do not whistle. This adaptation is theorised to allow acoustic crypsis from eavesdropping predators, as the sounds produced are outside of the detectable frequencies of killer whales. Although NBHF clicks are limited in acoustic range, they have a better resolution for small targets and are thought to provide a foraging advantage in the often cluttered, nearshore environment in which these species occur. Heaviside's also produce a second click type, of lower frequency and broader bandwidth, that is within the hearing range of killer whales. These calls are produced most frequently in groups engaging in social behaviour. It is likely that the dolphins use these calls when socialising away from predator threat and switch to high frequency clicks when foraging and travelling.

== Population status ==
No total abundance estimate currently exists, however a population estimate of 6,345 for the region between Table Bay and Lamberts Bay, South Africa represents the southernmost populations in the species range. Local population estimates for Walvis bay and Lüderitz are 508 and 494 respectively. A visual and acoustic line-transect ship survey estimated an average of 1594 dolphins in the Namibian Islands' Marine Protected Area (NIMPA), which spans 400 km (250 mi) of coastline along southern Namibia (REF Martin et al. 2020). Quantification of abundance throughout the range is still required.

== Threats ==
Heaviside's dolphins are exposed to a variety of threats given their limited range in coastal shallow waters which are subject to a range of anthropogenic activities. Directed catch has occurred historically, with meat being used for human consumption.

=== Bycatch and hunting ===
Heaviside's dolphins are exposed to several poorly quantified and rapidly changing human threats including fisheries bycatch related mortality and illegal directed catch (Elwen and Gopal, 2018; Alfaro-Shigueto et al., 2019). Recently developed mid water trawls for horse mackerel (specifically Trachurus capensis) are considered an emerging threat.

=== Climate change ===
Heaviside's dolphins are listed amongst the cetacean species most vulnerable to climate change as they are limited to a distribution range that includes both suitable shelf habitat and cool water temperatures (Best, 2007). The Benguela Current is the only eastern-boundary current bordered by warm-water currents at both its northern and southern limits. Consequently, small increases in water temperature could result in all shelf waters in this area becoming too warm for both species, and populations are expected to decline rather than shift poleward due to a lack of shelf habitat.

=== Boat interactions ===
Heaviside's dolphins may be exposed to increase in the marine eco-tourism business in Namibia, which has grown without regulation in Walvis Bay (Leeney, 2014). Negative effects have been demonstrated for other coastal cetacean species, for example the impact of tour boats on bottlenose dolphin behaviour in Walvis Bay includes a reduction in resting behaviour and an increase in socialising behaviour in the presence of tour boats (indurkyhua). One Heaviside's dolphin was documented in 2010 with evidence of a propeller strike along its flank. As individuals have small home ranges, they may be vulnerable to localised threats.

== Conservation status ==
Prior to 2018, the International Union for Conservation of Nature (IUCN) listed the Heaviside's as 'Data Deficient' however, as of 2017 the status was changed to 'Near Threatened', owing to improved knowledge on the species from multiple studies. Despite this, the overall population trend remains unknown, and there are many aspects of the species biology that remain to be studied.

Heaviside's dolphin is listed on Appendix II of the Convention on the Conservation of Migratory Species of Wild Animals and is included in the Memorandum of Understanding Concerning the Conservation of the Manatee and Small Cetaceans of Western Africa and Macaronesia. The Memorandum of Understanding was established in 2008 and aims to protect these species at a national, regional and global level.
