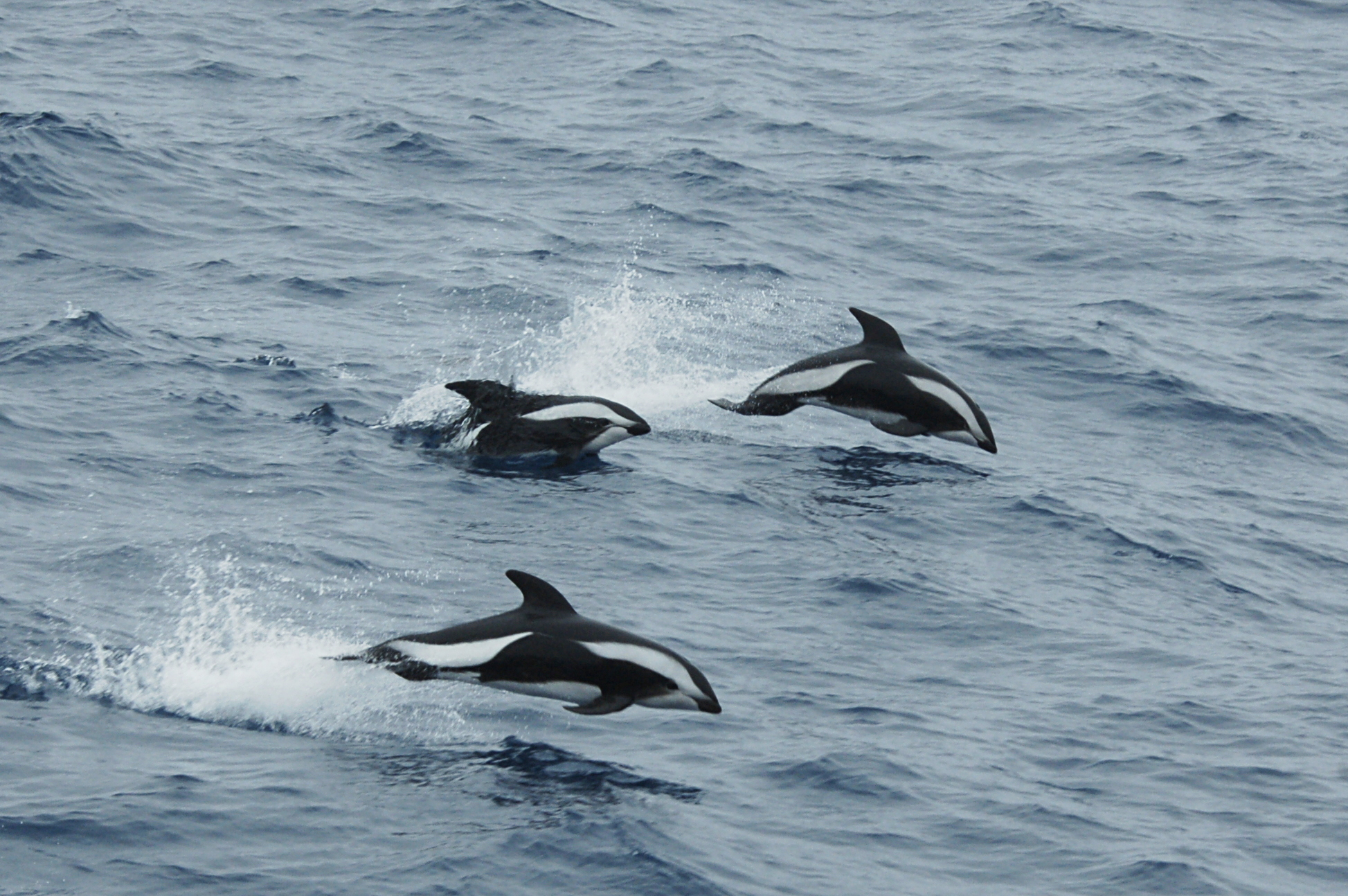
- Hourglass dolphins leaping in the Drake Passage
- Size compared to an average human

Conservation status
- Least Concern (IUCN 3.1)
- CITES Appendix II

Scientific classification
- Kingdom: Animalia
- Phylum: Chordata
- Class: Mammalia
- Infraclass: Placentalia
- Order: Artiodactyla
- Infraorder: Cetacea
- Family: Delphinidae
- Genus: Cephalorhynchus
- Species: C. cruciger

Binomial name
- Cephalorhynchus cruciger (Quoy & Gaimard, 1824)
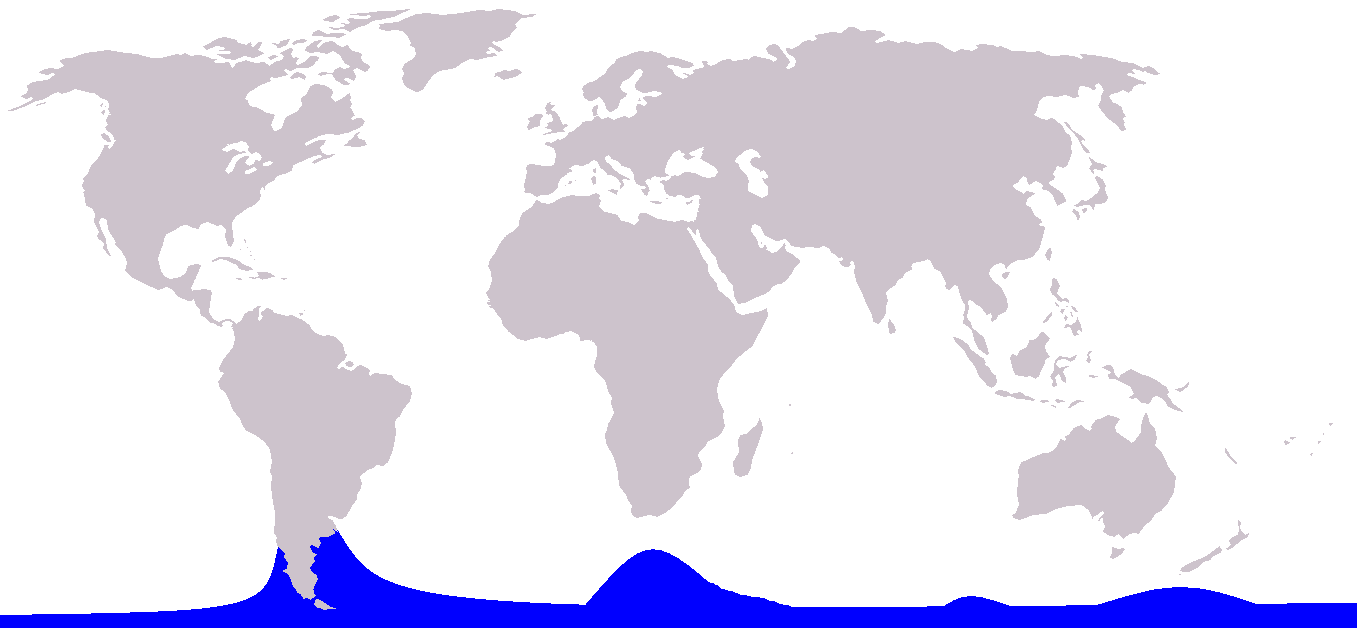
- Hourglass dolphin range

= Hourglass dolphin =

Species of mammal

The hourglass dolphin (Cephalorhynchus cruciger) is a small dolphin in the family Delphinidae that inhabits offshore Antarctic and sub-Antarctic waters. It is commonly seen from ships crossing the Drake Passage but has a circumpolar distribution.

The species was identified as a new species by Jean René Constant Quoy and Joseph Paul Gaimard in 1824 from a drawing made in the South Pacific in 1820. It is the only cetacean to have been widely accepted as a species solely on witness accounts.

== Description ==
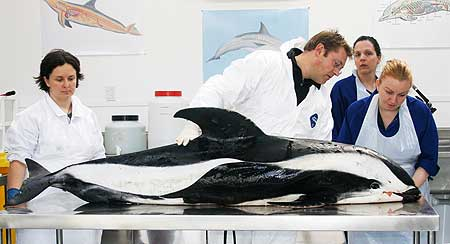
Necropsy of an hourglass dolphin. The markings on the side are a certain character for identification of the species.

The hourglass dolphin is colored black on top and white on the belly, with white patches on the sides and sometimes variations of dark grey. For this reason, it was colloquially known by whalers as a "sea cow" (although it does not belong to the taxonomic order Sirenia) or "sea skunk". Each flank has a white patch at the front, above the beak, eye and flipper, and a second patch at the rear. These two patches are connected by a thin white strip, creating, loosely speaking, an hourglass shape; hence the common name of the dolphin. The markings can vary between individuals. The scientific name cruciger means "cross-carrier" and refers to the area of black coloration, which, viewed from above, vaguely resembles a Maltese cross or cross pattée.

In its usual range the dolphin is easily identifiable. The southern right whale dolphin is the only cetacean of comparable size and comparable coloration with overlapping distributions that lives as far south. The absence of a dorsal fin in right whale dolphins, in contrast to the generally tall and curved dorsal fin of hourglass dolphins makes confusion of the two species very unlikely. The dorsal fin in hourglass dolphins is variable and the curvature may be particularly pronounced in older animals. The hourglass dolphin has disk-shaped vertebrae and other inclined processes which gives them higher stability.

An adult male is about 1.8 meters (5.9 feet) in length and weighs over 90 kilograms (about 200 lbs). Juvenile females range from 1.6 to 1.8 meters (5.2 to 5.9 ft) in length and weigh from 70 to 90 kg (150 to 200 lb). Although this species is small, they are extremely fast and agile. Males are thought to be slightly smaller and lighter than females, although the small number of specimens does not permit a firm conclusion.

Female gestation periods are estimated to be 12.9 months and they tend to give birth between mid to late July through October.

An hourglass dolphin has 26 to 34 teeth in their upper jaw and 27 to 35 teeth in their lower jaw. Like all species of dolphins, they use echolocation to find food. There have been no verified sightings of calves and their coloration, size, and diet remains unknown.

== Geographic range and distribution ==
The range is circumpolar from close to the Antarctic pack ice to about 45°S. The northernmost confirmed sightings are 36°S in the South Atlantic Ocean and 33°S near Valparaíso, Chile, in the Pacific. The overall circumpolar distribution is about 45°S to 67°S, with few sightings made near islands and the majority in the Southern ocean. Sightings have been made most commonly from the south of New Zealand, around the South Shetland Islands and off Tierra del Fuego, Argentina.

== Habitat ==
The hourglass dolphins is a completely Antarctic species. This species prefers colder water so they spend most time closer to the surface where the temperature is around -0.3°C to 7°C. The warmest waters hourglass dolphins have reportedly found in was 14c.

Hourglass dolphins migrate, moving farther south in the austral summer and moving further north during the austral winter.

== Behavior ==
Hourglass dolphins are often seen in smaller groups up to 10–15 individuals, though groups of up to 100 have been observed.

They share feeding grounds with other cetaceans such as pilot whales, minke whales and southern right whale dolphins and are regularly seen with fin whales. Hourglass dolphins frequently bow-ride waves from ships and baleen whales. There has been observations of hourglass dolphins with southern bottlenose whales, orcas, and Arnoux's beaked whales.

Examinations of the stomach contents of the few specimens indicate they eat mantis shrimp, polychaete worms, and various (unrecorded) species of squid and small fish.

The hourglass dolphin life-span is estimated to be similar to that of Atlantic white-sided dolphin and Pacific white-sided dolphin, around 27-46 years.

== Taxonomy ==
The species was first named Delphinus cruciger by Quoy and Gaimard (1824) after their sighting in January 1820. Lesson and Garnot (1827) named another dolphin with two white patches on the sides Delphinus bivittatus. Throughout the 19th and early 20th centuries, scientists have given the hourglass dolphin various synonyms, including Phocoena crucigera (Philippi, 1893), Electra crucigera (Gray, 1871), and Lagenorhynchus clanculus (Gray, 1846; 1849; 1850; 1866). Traditionally placed in the genus Lagenorhynchus, molecular analyses consistently supports that the species is more closely related to the subfamily Lissodelphininae (right whale dolphins and dolphins of the genus Cephalorhynchus). A revision of the Lagenorhynchus genus in 2025 transferred the hourglass dolphin, together with its sister-species, Peale's dolphin, to the genus Cephalorhynchus (which includes, among others, Hector's dolphin)., rather than moving it to the resurrected genus Sagmatias (together with three other Lagenorhynchus species), as some authors suggested.

== Conservation status ==
Sighting surveys were conducted in 1976–77 and 1987–88. Abundance was estimated to be 144,300 individuals, based on line transect sightings in January 1977 and January 1988 in northern Antarctic waters. While the population of the hourglass dolphins has slightly declined since 1988, they are not considered endangered.

The hourglass dolphin is covered by the Memorandum of Understanding for the Conservation of Cetaceans and Their Habitats in the Pacific Islands Region (Pacific Cetaceans MOU). They are also listed in Appendix II of the Convention on International Trade in Endangered Species (CITES). Although they have not been studied extensively, there are no known major threats to hourglass dolphins, and the species is listed as Least Concern on the IUCN Red List.

== See also ==
- List of cetaceans
