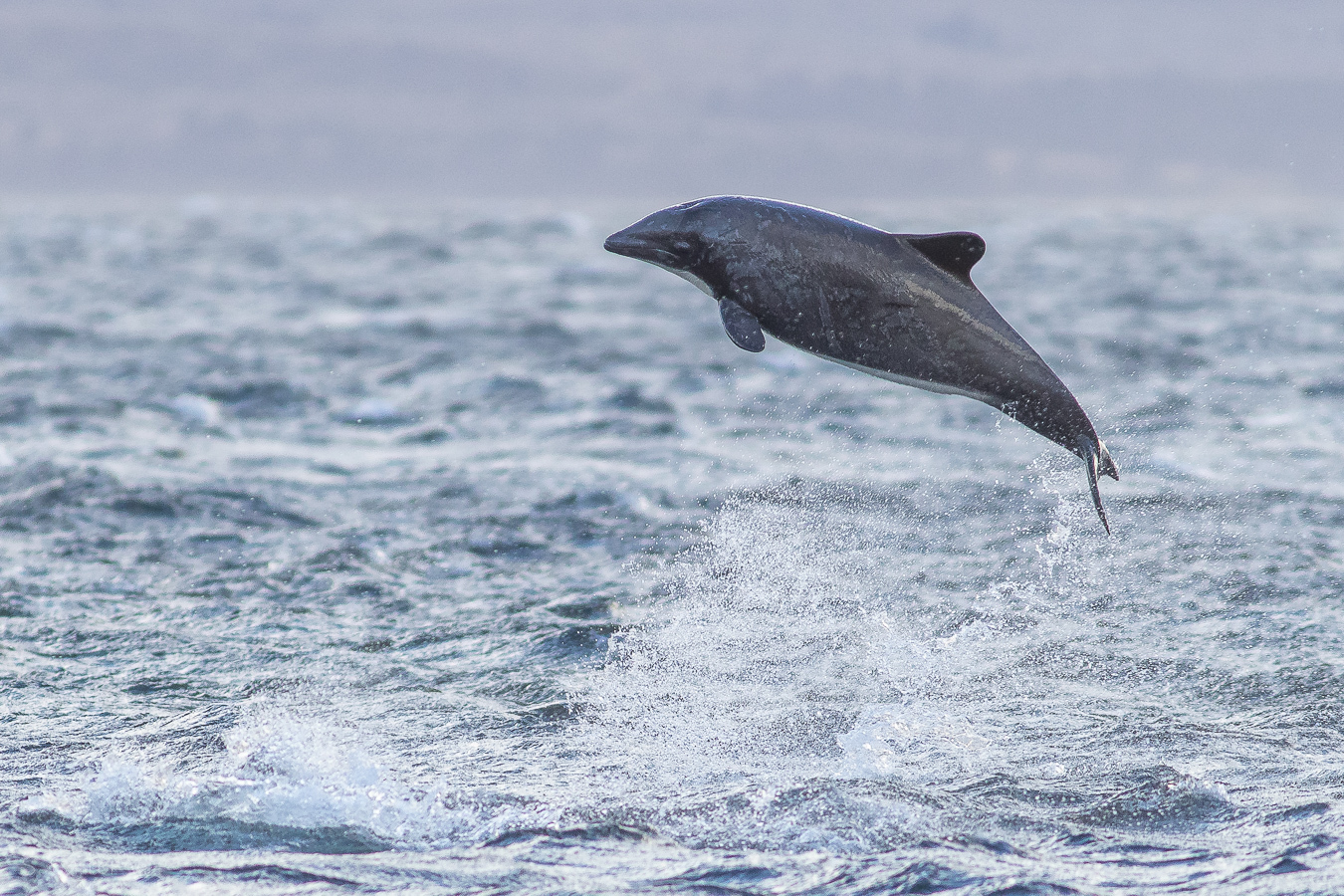
- In Magallanes
- Size compared to an average human

Conservation status
- Near Threatened (IUCN 3.1)
- CITES Appendix II

Scientific classification
- Kingdom: Animalia
- Phylum: Chordata
- Class: Mammalia
- Order: Artiodactyla
- Infraorder: Cetacea
- Family: Delphinidae
- Genus: Cephalorhynchus
- Species: C. eutropia

Binomial name
- Cephalorhynchus eutropia Gray, 1846
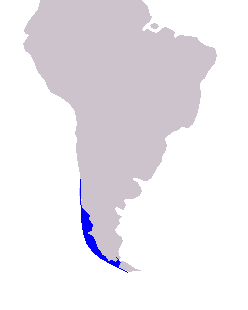
- Chilean dolphin range

= Chilean dolphin =

Chilean dolphin Temporal range: Holocene

Species of mammal

The Chilean dolphin (Cephalorhynchus eutropia), also known as the Black dolphin, is one of six dolphins in the genus Cephalorhynchus. The dolphin is found only off the coast of Chile; it is commonly referred to in the country as tonina.

== Characteristics ==
=== Physical description ===
The Chilean dolphin is small at around 1.7 metres (5 ft 7 in) in length, with a blunt head. Adults reach up to 60 kg, with females slightly larger than the male bulls. This dolphin is thickly shaped with its girth up to two-thirds its length. Their small and thick shape is often mistaken for other types of porpoises. The dorsal fin and flippers are small in proportion to body size in comparison with other dolphins. The throat, underside, and the closest part of the flippers to the body are white. The remainder of the body is a mix of greys. A black line connects their blowhole, eyes, and dorsal fin. It has 28–34 pairs of teeth in the upper jaw and 29–33 in the lower. The two eyes are positioned at the ends of the mouth lines, giving the appearance of a smile. The tail has a characteristic notch in the middle. The most distinct features of the Chilean dolphin are its short beak, round dorsal fin, and rounded flippers.

=== Behavior ===
Unlike other types of dolphins that commonly exhibit social behavior, the Chilean dolphin often remains distant during possible encounters with humans. The Chilean dolphin is normally sighted in small groups of around two to ten individuals, with some larger gatherings of up to 50 individuals occasionally sighted. A group of dolphins is referred to as a pod, school, or herd. The species exhibits epimeletic behavior, meaning that when one individual in the pod is injured or sick, healthy members will help take care of the sick.

=== Communication ===
Communication between individuals is performed with a series of clicks, whistles, and cries at varying frequencies. Chilean dolphins use echolocation to navigate their surroundings. They are able to perceive visual, tactile, acoustic, ultrasound, echolocation, and chemical information.

=== Reproduction ===
Little is known about the reproduction of the Chilean dolphin. They mate in the early winter and females give birth to their offspring in the spring. Female dolphins, known as cows, usually have one calf every two to three years. Calves reach full maturity between ages 5 and 9 years. Young calves are cared for by their mothers, where they learn to forage and navigate social behavior.

=== Lifespan ===
Longevity, gestation, and lactation periods are not known, but are believed to be similar in length to the more studied, and similar, Hector's and Commerson's dolphins which have a gestation period of about 10 months to one year and maximum longevity of 20 years.

=== Diet ===
The Chilean dolphin primarily feeds on sardines, anchovies, salmon, squid, crustaceans, and green algae. They swim in a circular or zig-zag pattern to herd the fish that they eat.

== Population and distribution ==
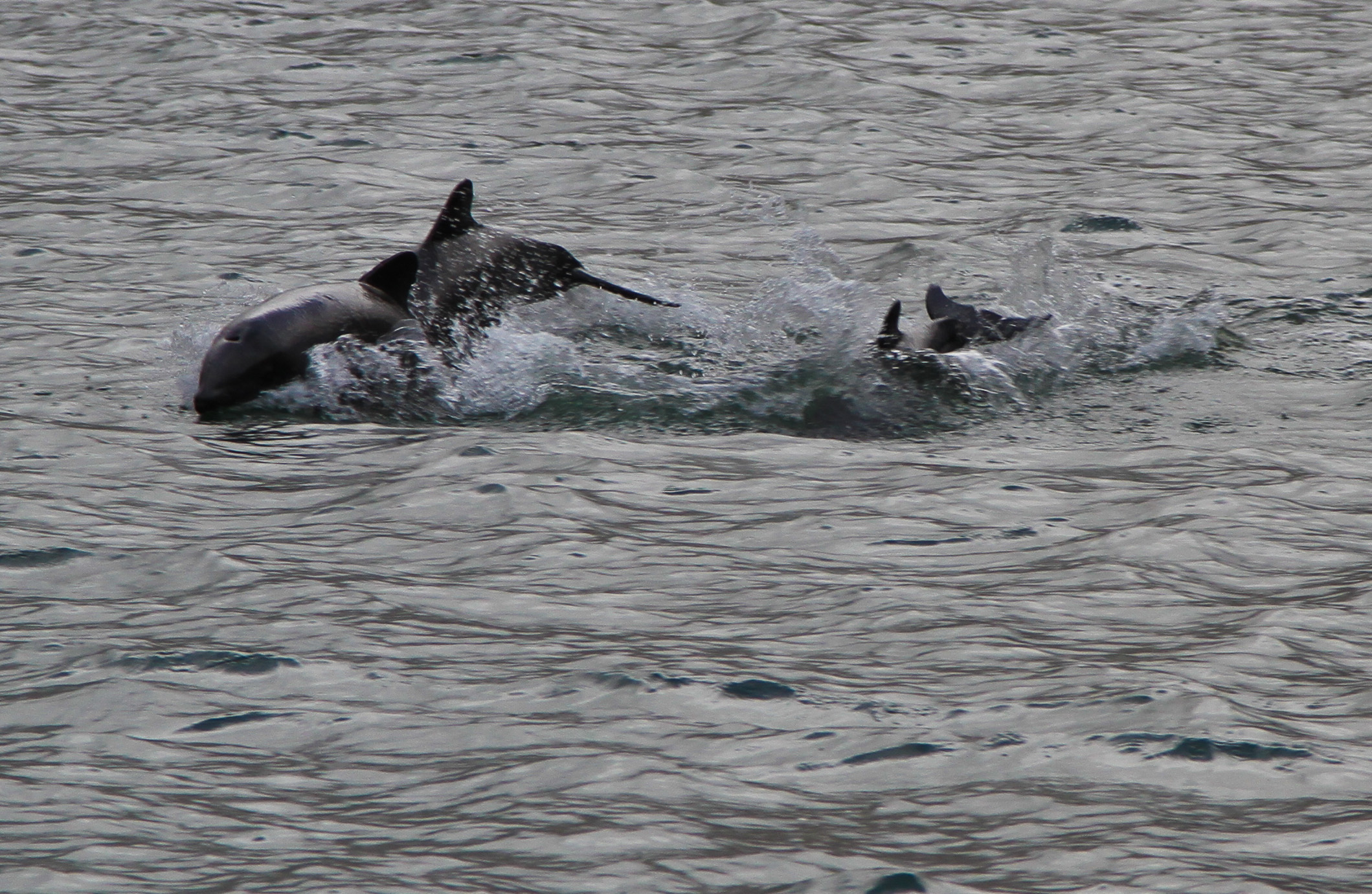
At Gordon Island

The population of the Chilean dolphin, perhaps one of the least studied of all cetaceans, is not known with certainty. It is estimated that less than 5,000 Chilean dolphins remain in the wild. Whatever its number, the Chilean dolphin is endemic to the coast of Chile, meaning it is no found anywhere else in the world. They are believed to not migrate. The dolphin is seen over a wider interval of latitudes than other Cephalorhynchus species – from Valparaíso at 33°S to Cape Horn at 55°S. Larger groups of 20-–50 are found in the northern areas of its habitat, including reports of a 24-kilometre-long (15 mi) pod. However, the majority of the Chilean dolphins population is found in the southern regions. The species prefers shallow water regions, specifically areas near rivers and high tides. The close association with riverine and estuarine ecosystems makes Chilean dolphins extremely vulnerable to habitat loss both from coastal and upstream river basin degradation. Their relatively limited distribution and need for specific environmental conditions makes the Chilean dolphin particularly susceptible to population loss, even in the most remote areas.

== Habitat ==
The Chilean dolphin is seen over a wider interval of latitudes than other Cephalorhynchus species — from Valparaíso at 33°S to Cape Horn at 55°S. In the northern areas, they are found in bays and estuaries with more exposed coastlines, while they prefer fjords and channels in the southern regions. They are commonly seen in bays and channels as well as near rivers and areas with greater changes in tide. Most Chilean dolphins reside in salt water, however they have been spotted in freshwater rivers. Additionally, Chilean dolphins prefer shallow waters, usually less than 20 meters, and tend to stay within 500 meters of shore. Research has found that pods are highly localized, and environmental factors often serve as barriers between pods.

== Threats ==
Humans pose the largest threat to the Chilean dolphin population. In addition to being caught for human consumption, the dolphins are also used as bait for long-line sword fishing and crab fisheries. It is reported that between 1,300 and 1,500 Chilean dolphins are harpooned in the Strait of Magellan each year. Use as bait was particularly popular until the 1990s, and hunting of Chilean dolphins is now illegal. Aquaculture farms for salmon, anti-sea lion nets, and boat traffic also pose as threats to the species. Since 2023, at least 14 Chilean dolphins have died as a result of widespread bird flu in Chile. Reports indicate that Chilean dolphins are preyed upon by killer whales and sharks. The increase of human activity near the Chilean coastline has also degraded the fragile shallow water habitat. Hydroelectric dams and inter-basin water transfer pose as significant threats to Chilean dolphins residing in freshwater rivers.

== Conservation ==
The Chilean dolphin is listed on Appendix II Convention on the Conservation of Migratory Species of Wild Animals (CMS). It is listed on Appendix II as it has an unfavorable conservation status or would benefit significantly from international co-operation organized by tailored agreements. Initiatives established by Catholic University of the Maule (UCM) and the Environmental Protection Fund FPA of the National Environment Commission (Chile) aim to protect the natural habitat of the Chilean dolphin and provide safe tourism opportunities to view the dolphin.

== Name ==
In the early part of the 20th century, the Chilean dolphin was commonly known as the black dolphin. This was later agreed to be a poor choice of name. Most of the few individual specimens studied by scientists were either washed-up individuals whose skin had darkened due to exposure to air or live specimens seen at sea but only at a distance (and so appeared darker than they were). As more specimens were studied, it became clear that the back of the dolphin was in fact a mixture of grey colors and that its underside was white. The scientific community is now universally agreed in naming the dolphin Chilean on account of its distribution along the coast of the country.

== Pictures ==
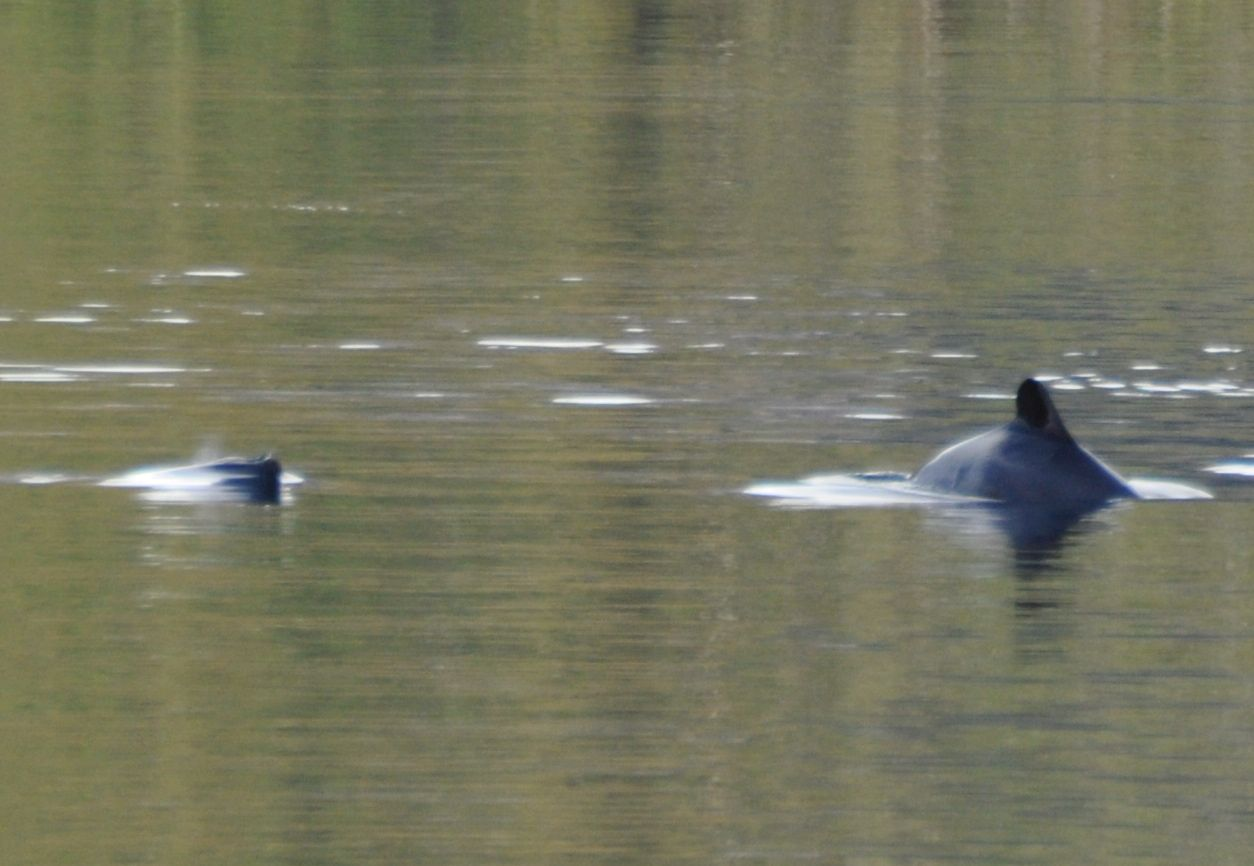

== See also ==
- Cetacean Conservation Center
- Dolphin Research Center
- List of cetaceans
- Southern Ocean
