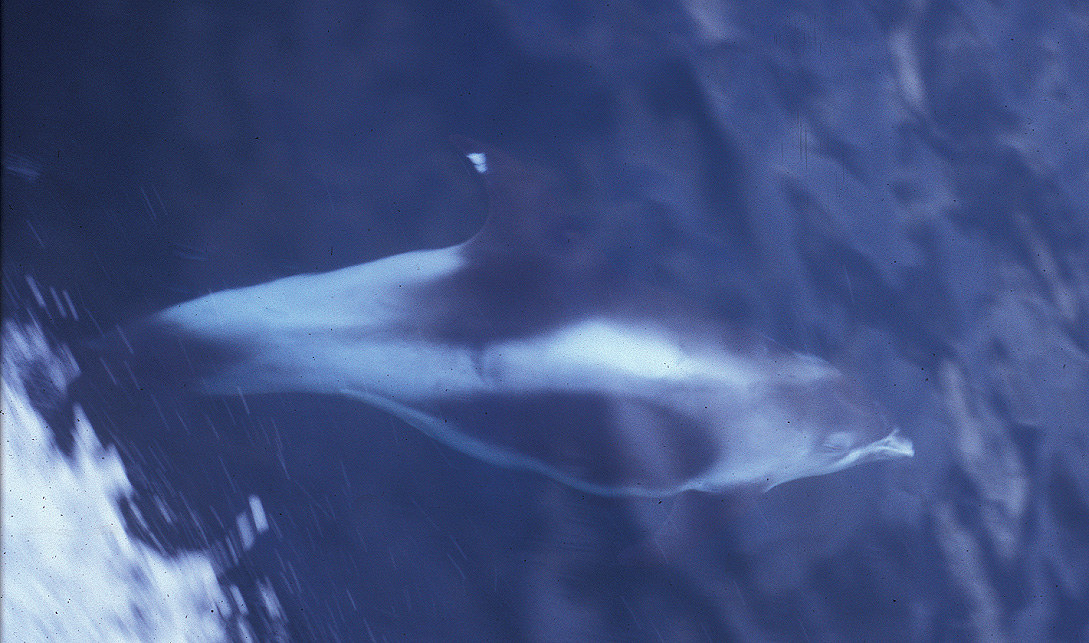
- Lagenorhynchus albirostris

Scientific classification
- Kingdom: Animalia
- Phylum: Chordata
- Class: Mammalia
- Order: Artiodactyla
- Infraorder: Cetacea
- Family: Delphinidae
- Genus: Lagenorhynchus; Gray, 1846

Type species
- Delphinus albirostris Gray, 1846

Species
- Lagenorhynchus albirostris

= Lagenorhynchus =

Lagenorhynchus Temporal range: Pliocene to Recent

Genus of mammals

Lagenorhynchus is a genus of oceanic dolphins in the infraorder Cetacea, that formerly contained six extant species. However, there was consistent molecular evidence that the genus is polyphyletic and several of the species moved to other genera, leaving only the white-beaked dolphin in this genus among extant species. In addition, the extinct species Lagenorhynchus harmatuki is also classified in this genus.

== Etymology ==
The name Lagenorhynchus derives from the Greek lagenos meaning "bottle" and rhynchus meaning "beak". Indeed, the "bottle-nose" is a characteristic of this genus. However, the dolphins popularly called bottlenose dolphins belong in the genus Tursiops.

== Taxonomy ==
For a long time there was compelling phylogenetic molecular evidence that the genus Lagenorhynchus is polyphyletic, in that it contained several species that are not closely related. LeDuc, Perrin & Dizon 1999 found that white-beaked and Atlantic white-sided dolphins are phylogenetically isolated within the Delphinidae, where they are believed to be rather basal members of the family, along with the orca (subfamily Orcininae). This was confirmed in 2025 by Galatius, et al.

As a result, in 2025 most of the species previously placed in Lagenorhynchus were moved to other genera, leaving it as a monotypic genus containing only the white-beaked dolphin. Other species previously included in Lagenorhynchus were moved to:

- Atlantic white-sided dolphin Leucopleurus acutus
- Pacific white-sided dolphin Aethalodelphis obliquidens
- Dusky dolphin Aethalodelphis obscurus
- Peale's dolphin Cephalorhynchus australis
- Hourglass dolphin Cephalorhynchus cruciger

This phylogeny is supported by acoustic and morphological data; both the hourglass and Peale's dolphins share, with the other species of Cephalorhynchus, a distinctive type of echolocation signal known as a narrow-band/high-frequency signal. This signal is also used by porpoises (Phocoenidae) and the pygmy sperm whales (Kogiidae), but is not found among other dolphins. According to Schevill & Watkins 1971, Peale's dolphin, and the other Cephalorhynchus species, are the only dolphins that do not "whistle"; presumably, this would be the case for hourglass dolphins, as well. Peale's dolphin also shares with several Cephalorhynchus species the possession of a distinct white marking behind the pectoral (“armpit”) fin.

The melon-headed whale was first classified as member of the genus Lagenorhynchus, but was later moved to its own genus, Peponocephala.
