= Britannia Bay =

Britannia Bay Brittaniabaai
- Location within Western Cape Location within South Africa
- Coordinates: 32.717°S 17.954°E
- Country: South Africa
- Province: Western Cape
- District: West Coast
- Municipality: Saldanha Bay

Area
  - Total: 1.49 km^{2} (0.58 sq mi)

Population (2011)
  - Total: 210
  - Density: 140/km^{2} (370/sq mi)

Racial makeup (2011)
  - Black African: 4.8%
  - Coloured: 3.3%
  - White: 91.0%
  - Other: 1.0%

First languages (2011)
  - Afrikaans: 82.2%
  - English: 14.4%
  - Other: 3.4%
- Time zone: UTC+2 (SAST)
- PO box: 7382

Britannia Bay is a small town in the West Coast District Municipality in the Western Cape province of South Africa, approximately 141 kilometres (88 mi) from Cape Town.

The village takes its name from a British East Indiaman ship which was badly damaged by a reef in the bay. Rediscovered in January 1998, the wreck of the Britannia has been placed under the supervision of the Council for National Monuments.

In June 2020, a well-preserved giant squid washed up on a nearby beach.
