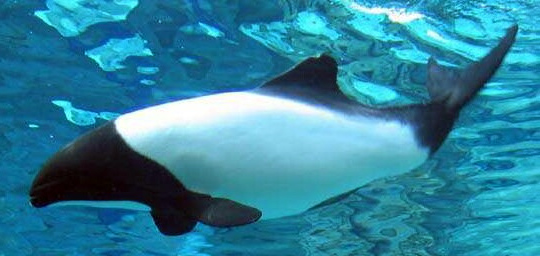
- Commerson's dolphin

Scientific classification
- Kingdom: Animalia
- Phylum: Chordata
- Class: Mammalia
- Infraclass: Placentalia
- Order: Artiodactyla
- Infraorder: Cetacea
- Family: Delphinidae
- Subfamily: Lissodelphininae
- Genus: Cephalorhynchus; Gray, 1846

Type species
- Delphinus heavisidii Gray, 1828

Species
- C. australis C. commersonii C. cruciger C. eutropia C. heavisidii C. hectori

= Cephalorhynchus =

Cephalorhynchus Temporal range: Holocene

Genus of mammals

Cephalorhynchus is a genus in the dolphin family Delphinidae.

== Extant species ==
It consists of six species:

Image	Common name	Scientific name	Distribution
	Peale's dolphin	C. australis	Southern South America
	Commerson's dolphin	C. commersonii	Argentina including Puerto Deseado, in the Strait of Magellan and around Tierra del Fuego, and near the Falkland Islands, near the Kerguelen Islands in the southern part of the Indian Ocean
	Hourglass dolphin	C. cruciger	Argentina, Chile, New Zealand
	Chilean dolphin	C. eutropia	coast of Chile
	Heaviside's dolphin	C. heavisidii	coast of northern Namibia at 17°S and as far south as the southern tip of South Africa
	Hector's dolphin	C. hectori	coastal regions of New Zealand

The species have similar physical features—they are small, generally playful, blunt-nosed dolphins—but they are found in distinct geographical locations.

A phylogenetic analysis in 2006 indicated the two species traditionally assigned to the genus Lagenorhynchus, the hourglass dolphin L. cruciger and Peale's dolphin L. australis are actually phylogenetically nested among the species of Cephalorhynchus, and they suggested that these two species should be transferred to the genus Cephalorhynchus. Some acoustic and morphological data support this arrangement, at least with respect to Peale's dolphin. In 2025 those two species were transferred to Cephalorhynchus.

According to a study in 1971, the Cephalorhynchus species are the only dolphins that do not whistle (no acoustic data are available for the hourglass dolphin). Peale's dolphin also shared with several Cephalorhynchus species the possession of a distinct white "armpit" marking behind the pectoral fin.

Subspecies are now recognized for the Commerson's dolphin and the Hector's dolphin.For the Commerson's dolphins, there are two different populations, one in the Kerguelen Islands in the southern Indian Ocean and one in southern South America and the Falkland Islands. These populations are 8,500 km apart and differ in body size, pigmentation, skull size, and shape. Unlike Hector's dolphins, Commerson's dolphins have not been classified as a separate species and are only recognized as a subspecies. The Hector's dolphins live in New Zealand coastal waters, but scientists have identified different geographic locations and genetically distinct groups. The North Island subspecies has become known as the Māui dolphin and is currently critically endangered.

== Diet ==
In general, the Cephalorhynchus genus diet consists of many different sea creatures. In a study, Hector's dolphins' stomachs contained 22 species of fish, 2 species of cephalopods, and 5 species of crustaceans.59% of the stomachs included red cod, 49% contained ahuru, and the most prevalent species found was arrow squid. The study also estimated the size of the fish, with most prey estimated to measure less than 10 cm when consumed. Gender also appears to play a role in diet: females tend to eat more red cod, while males consume less and have more sprat in their diet. There is also a dietary shift between juveniles and adults, with sprat more common in juveniles than in adults.

== Social Structure ==
Some species, such as Hector's dolphins, have been observed in groups. Hector's dolphins are typically seen in small groups of 2 to 4 dolphins, but groups of up to 16 dolphins have also been observed.Groups of 20 or more individuals have also been recorded, often splitting into smaller subgroups. Group composition ranges from strictly single-sex to mixed-sex. Groups with mothers and calves contained no adult males. About 91% of groups with two to five individuals were single-sex, while larger groups tended to be mixed-sex. However, because 82.8% of observed groups contained fewer than six individuals, most observed groups were sexually segregated.

== Endangerment ==
The Cephalorhynchus genus faces threats ranging from fishing to accidental capture. Crab bait fisheries have been identified as a serious threat to Chilean dolphins. The Commerson's dolphin's southern South American population has been subjected to harpooning and accidental capture in fishing gear. Evidence suggests that hundreds of Commerson's dolphins were killed per year during the 1980s in southern Argentina and Chile. Hector's dolphins are at high risk of extinction in the coming decades unless gillnetting is reduced. They were previously classified as vulnerable but are now listed as endangered.

== Conservation ==
There are sanctuaries and conservation efforts in place to help these species. The New Zealand Department of Conservation established a sanctuary for Hector's dolphins around Banks Peninsula in 1988.Gillnetting is restricted in the sanctuary waters to prevent accidental entanglement of dolphins. There are also ongoing research programs on Heaviside's dolphin initiated by Dr. Peter Best and Blake Abernethy.In August 2001, the New Zealand Minister of Fisheries created a protected area that prohibits gillnet fishing within four nautical miles of shore along a segment of the North Island. NOAA also uses acoustic monitoring and detection systems to track dolphins.
