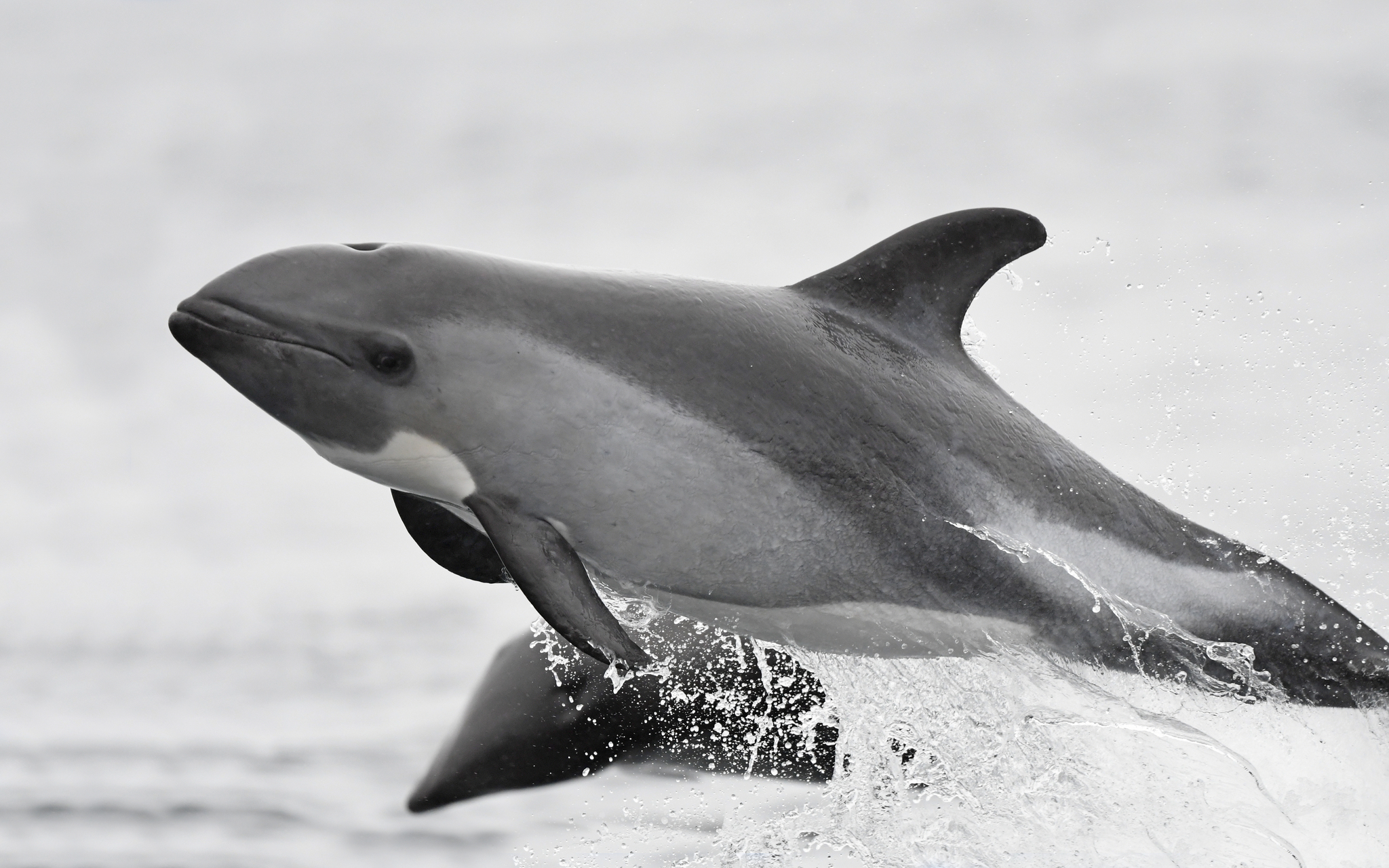

Conservation status
- Least Concern (IUCN 3.1)
- CITES Appendix II

Scientific classification
- Kingdom: Animalia
- Phylum: Chordata
- Class: Mammalia
- Order: Artiodactyla
- Infraorder: Cetacea
- Family: Delphinidae
- Genus: Cephalorhynchus
- Species: C. australis

Binomial name
- Cephalorhynchus australis (Peale, 1848)
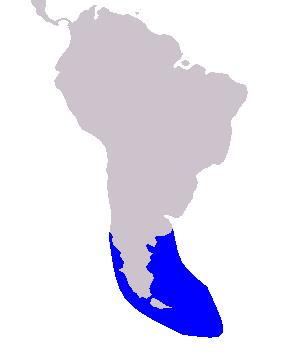
- Peale's dolphin range

= Peale's dolphin =

Species of mammal

Peale's dolphin (Cephalorhynchus australis) is a small dolphin found in the waters around Tierra del Fuego at the foot of South America. It is also commonly known as the black-chinned dolphin or Peale's black-chinned dolphin. However, since Rice's work Peale's dolphin has been adopted as the standard common name.

== Taxonomy ==
Though it had traditionally been placed in the genus Lagenorhynchus, molecular analyses indicated Peale's dolphin is more closely related to the dolphins of the genus Cephalorhynchus. Some behavioral and morphological data supported moving Peale's dolphin to Cephalorhynchus. According to Schevill & Watkins 1971, Peale's dolphin and the Cephalorhynchus species are the only dolphins that do not whistle. Peale's dolphin also shares with several Cephalorhynchus species the possession of a distinct white "armpit" marking behind the pectoral fin. As a result, Peale's dolphin was reclassified as Cephalorhynchus australis in 2025.

== Physical description ==
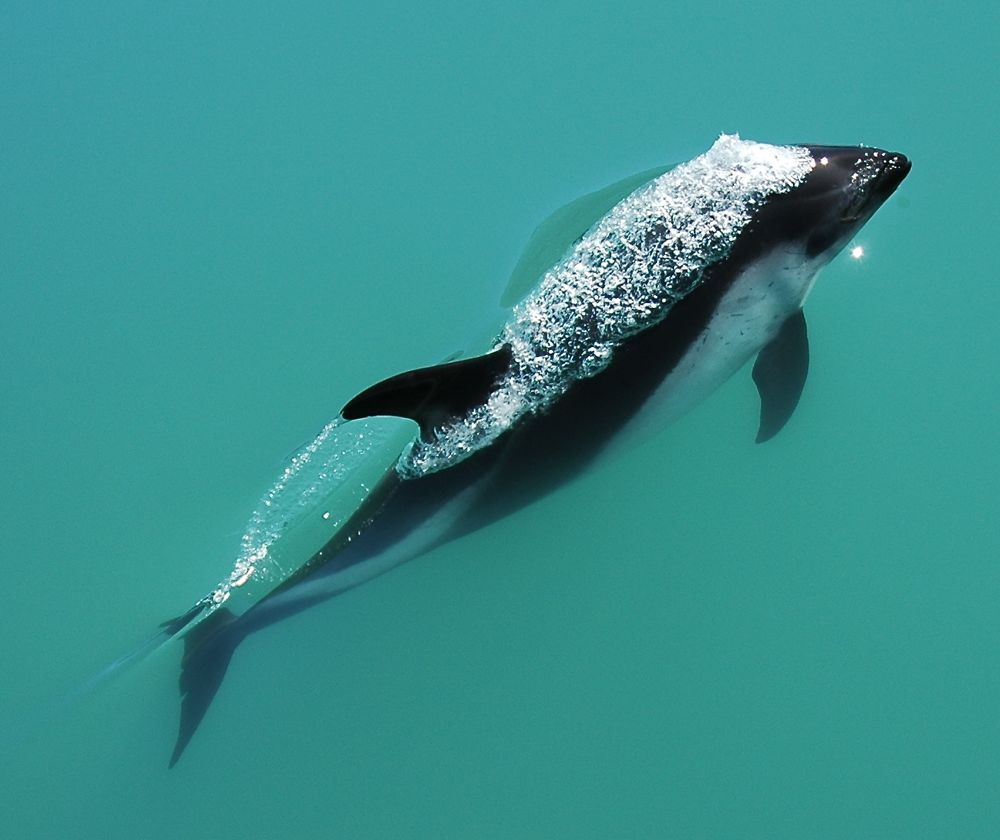
Peale's dolphin (Lagenorhynchus australis)

Peale's dolphin is of typical size in its family — about 1 m (3 ft 3 in) in length at birth and 2.1 m (6 ft 11 in) when fully mature. Its adult weight is about 115 kg (254 lb). It has a dark-grey face and chin. The back is largely black with a single off-white stripe running, curving, and thickened as it runs down the back on each side. The belly is white. Conspicuously, also, a white patch occurs just behind each flipper. These are known as the "armpits". The flanks also have a large white-grey patch above the flipper. The dorsal fin is large for this size cetacean and distinctively falcate. The flippers themselves are small and pointed. The tail fin, too, has pointed tips, as well as a notch at its middle.

The species looks similar to the dusky dolphin when viewed at a distance, and may be confused with it.

== Population and distribution ==
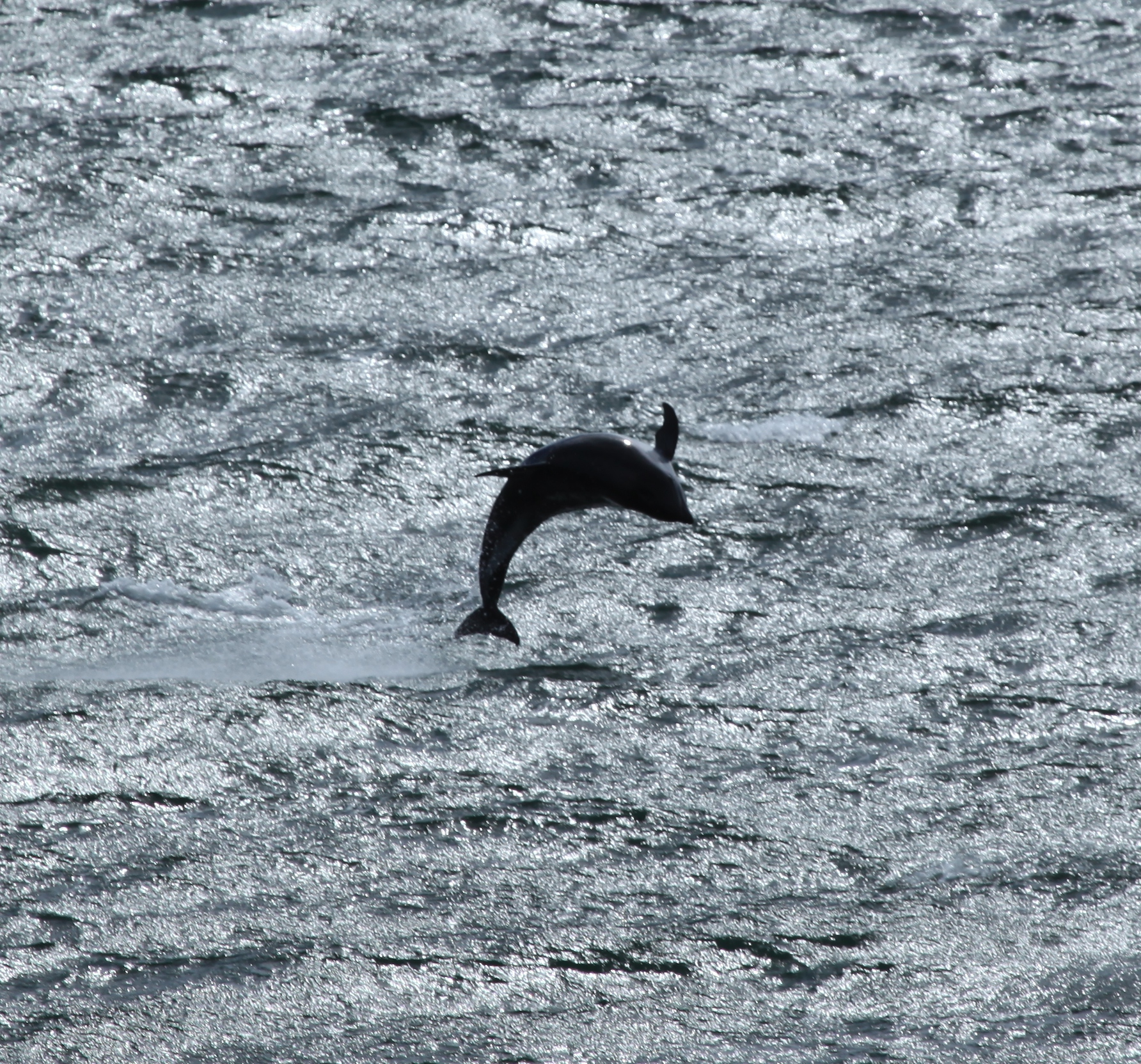
Peale's dolphin leaping off Falkland Islands

Peale's dolphin is endemic to the coastal waters around southern South America. On the Pacific side, they have been seen as far north as Valdivia, Chile, at 38°S. On the Atlantic side, sightings typically diminish at about 44°S — near Golfo San Jorge, Argentina. In the south, they have been seen at almost 60°S — well into the Drake Passage.

They are often found in areas of fast-moving waters, such as entrances to channels and narrows, as well as close to shore in safe areas such as bays.

The total population is unknown, but recent research estimates there to be ~21,800 individuals in the South Atlantic part of its range.

== Behaviour ==
Peale's dolphins congregate in small groups, usually about five, and sometimes up to 20. On rare occasions in summer and autumn, much larger groups have been recorded (100 individuals). A typical pattern is for the group to move in a line parallel to the shore. They usually swim slowly, but are prone to bursts of activity.

Peale's dolphins are often found swimming slowly near kelp beds. They have been found to associate with other cetaceans, such as Commerson's dolphins.

Using underwater acoustic recordings, it has been shown that Peale's dolphins can produce both broadband clicks and tonal whistles, along with the usual NBHF clicks produced by other whistling Odontoceti species.

== Food and foraging ==
In the southwestern South Atlantic, Peale's dolphin forages in the coastal ecosystem, feeding mainly on the demersal and bottom fish such as southern cod and Patagonian grenadier; also, octopus, squid, and shrimps have been found in stomachs examined. They feed in or near kelp beds and in open waters, with cooperative feeding, such as straight-line and large circle formations or star-burst feeding in which large groups encircle prey.

== Conservation ==
Peale's dolphins' propensity for moving over only small areas and staying close to shore has rendered them vulnerable to interference by man. During the 1970s and '80s, Chilean fishermen killed and used thousands of Peale's dolphins for crab bait each year. This practice has decreased, but has not been made illegal.

In Argentina, Peale's dolphins have been reported becoming trapped in gill nets, but the extent of this is not known. Conservation groups such as the Whale and Dolphin Conservation demand further research be made into this species.

The Peale's dolphin or black-chinned dolphin is listed on Appendix II of the Convention on the Conservation of Migratory Species of Wild Animals (CMS). It is listed on Appendix II as it has an unfavourable conservation status or would benefit significantly from international co-operation organised by tailored agreements.

== See also ==
- List of cetaceans
- Marine biology
