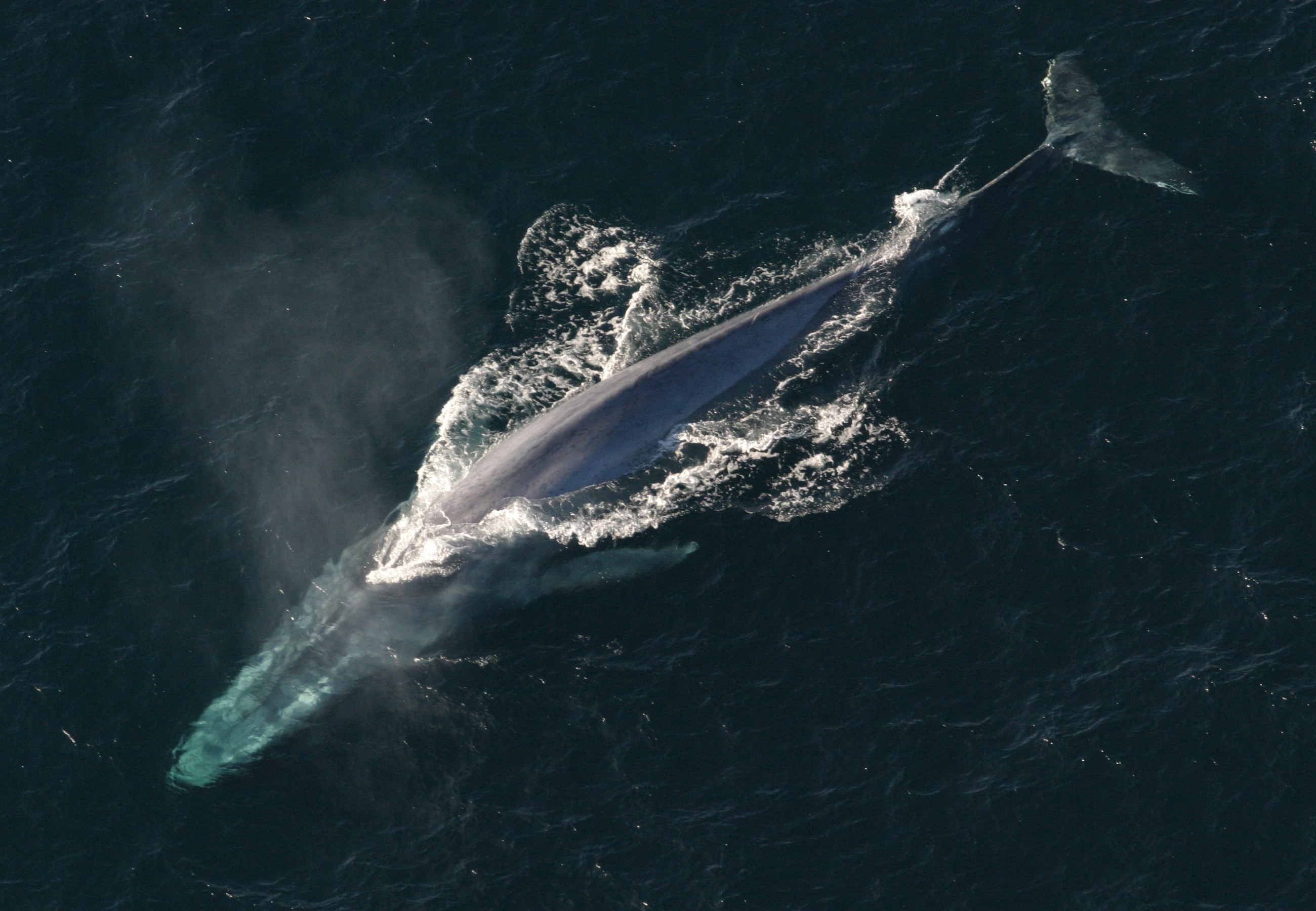
- Adult blue whale (Balaenoptera musculus)
- Size compared to an average human

Conservation status
- Endangered (IUCN 3.1)

- Vulnerable (NatureServe)
- CITES Appendix I

Scientific classification
- Kingdom: Animalia
- Phylum: Chordata
- Class: Mammalia
- Order: Artiodactyla
- Infraorder: Cetacea
- Family: Balaenopteridae
- Genus: Balaenoptera
- Species: B. musculus

Binomial name
- Balaenoptera musculus (Linnaeus, 1758)

Subspecies
- B. m. brevicauda Ichihara, 1966; ?B. m. indica Blyth, 1859; B. m. intermedia Burmeister, 1871; B. m. musculus Linnaeus, 1758
- Blue whale range (in blue)

Synonyms
- Balaena musculus Linnaeus, 1758; Balaenoptera gibbar Scoresby 1820; Pterobalaena gigas Van Beneden 1861; Physalus latirostris Flower 1864; Sibbaldius borealis Gray 1866; Flowerius gigas Lilljeborg 1867; Sibbaldius sulfureus Cope 1869; Balaenoptera sibbaldii Sars 1875

= Blue whale =

Blue whale Temporal range: Early Pleistocene – Recent 1.5–0 Ma

A species of whale; the largest animal known.

The blue whale (Balaenoptera musculus) is a species of baleen whale and the largest marine mammal in the rorqual family Balaenopteridae. Reaching a maximum confirmed length of 29.9–30.5 m (98–100 ft) and weighing up to 190–200 t (190–200 long tons; 210–220 short tons), it is the largest animal known to have ever existed. (Note: The extinct whale species Perucetus colossus (described in 2023) has been suggested as a potential contender of the blue whale in size, however, this was later disputed in 2024. Several extinct dinosaurs may also have reached a similar mass.) The blue whale's long and slender body can be of various shades of greyish-blue on its upper surface and somewhat lighter underneath. Four subspecies are recognized: B. m. musculus in the North Atlantic and North Pacific, B. m. intermedia in the Southern Ocean, B. m. brevicauda (the pygmy blue whale) in the Indian Ocean and South Pacific Ocean, and B. m. indica in the Northern Indian Ocean. There is a population in the waters off Chile that may constitute a fifth subspecies.

In general, blue whale populations migrate between their summer feeding areas near the poles and their winter breeding grounds near the tropics. There is also evidence of year-round residencies, and partial or age- and sex-based migration. Blue whales are filter feeders; their diet consists almost exclusively of krill. They are generally solitary or gather in small groups, and have no well-defined social structure other than mother–calf bonds. Blue whales vocalize, with a fundamental frequency ranging from 8 to 25 Hz; their vocalizations may vary by region, season, behavior, and time of day.

The blue whale was abundant in nearly all the Earth's oceans until the end of the 19th century. It was hunted almost to the point of extinction by whalers until the International Whaling Commission banned all blue whale hunting in 1966. The International Union for Conservation of Nature has listed blue whales as endangered as of 2018. Blue whales continue to face numerous man-made threats such as ship strikes, pollution, ocean noise, and climate change.

== Taxonomy ==
=== Nomenclature ===
The genus name, Balaenoptera, means winged whale, while the species name, musculus, could mean "muscle" or a diminutive form of "mouse", possibly a pun by Carl Linnaeus when he named the species in Systema Naturae. One of the first published descriptions of a blue whale comes from Robert Sibbald's Phalainologia Nova, after Sibbald found a stranded whale in the estuary of the Firth of Forth, Scotland, in 1692. The name "blue whale" was derived from the Norwegian blåhval, coined by Svend Foyn shortly after he had perfected the harpoon gun. The Norwegian scientist G. O. Sars adopted it as the common name in 1874.

Blue whales were referred to as "Sibbald's rorqual", after Robert Sibbald, who first described the species. Whalers sometimes referred to them as "sulphur bottom" whales, as the bellies of some individuals are tinged with yellow. This tinge is due to a coating of huge numbers of diatoms. (Herman Melville briefly refers to "sulphur bottom" whales in his novel Moby-Dick.)

=== Evolution ===
- Balaenopteridae
  - Minke whale
  - - - B. musculus (blue whale)
      - B. borealis (sei whale)
    - - Eschrichtius robustus (gray whale)
      - - B. physalus (fin whale)
        - Megaptera novaeangliae (humpback whale)

A phylogenetic tree of six baleen whale species

Blue whales are rorquals in the family Balaenopteridae. A 2018 analysis estimates that the Balaenopteridae family diverged from other families in between 10.48 and 4.98 million years ago during the late Miocene. The earliest discovered anatomically modern blue whale is a partial skull fossil from southern Italy identified as B. cf. musculus, dating to the Early Pleistocene, roughly 1.5–1.25 million years ago. The Australian pygmy blue whale diverged during the Last Glacial Maximum. Their more recent divergence has resulted in the subspecies having a relatively low genetic diversity, and New Zealand blue whales have an even lower genetic diversity.

Whole genome sequencing suggests that blue whales are most closely related to sei whales with gray whales as a sister group. This study also found significant gene flow between minke whales and the ancestors of the blue and sei whale. Blue whales also displayed high genetic diversity.

==== Hybridization ====
Blue whales are known to interbreed with fin whales. The earliest description of a possible hybrid between a blue whale and a fin whale was a 19.7 m (65 ft) anomalous female whale with the features of both the blue and the fin whales taken in the North Pacific. A whale captured off northwestern Spain in 1984, was found to have been the product of a blue whale mother and a fin whale father.

Two live blue-fin whale hybrids have since been documented in the Gulf of St. Lawrence (Canada), and in the Azores (Portugal). DNA tests done in Iceland on a blue whale killed in July 2018 by the Icelandic whaling company Hvalur hf., found that the whale was the offspring of a male fin whale and female blue whale; however, the results are pending independent testing and verification of the samples. Because the International Whaling Commission classified blue whales as a "Protection Stock", trading their meat is illegal, and the kill is an infraction that must be reported. Blue-fin hybrids have been detected from genetic analysis of whale meat samples taken from Japanese markets. Blue-fin whale hybrids are capable of being fertile. Molecular tests on a 21 m (70 ft) pregnant female whale caught off Iceland in 1986 found that it had a blue whale mother and a fin whale father, while its fetus was sired by a blue whale.

In 2024, a genome analysis of North Atlantic blue whales found evidence that approximately 3.5% of the blue whales' genome was derived from hybridization with fin whales. Gene flow was found to be unidirectional from fin whales to blue whales. Comparison with Antarctic blue whales showed that this hybridization began after the separation of the northern and southern populations. Despite their smaller size, fin whales have similar cruising and sprinting speeds to blue whales, which would allow fin males to complete courtship chases with blue females.

There is a reference to a humpback–blue whale hybrid in the South Pacific, attributed to marine biologist Michael Poole.

=== Subspecies and stocks ===
At least four subspecies of blue whale are traditionally recognized, some of which are divided into population stocks or "management units". Like many large rorquals, the blue whale is a cosmopolitan species. They have a worldwide distribution, but are mostly absent from the Arctic Ocean and the Mediterranean, Okhotsk, and Bering Sea.

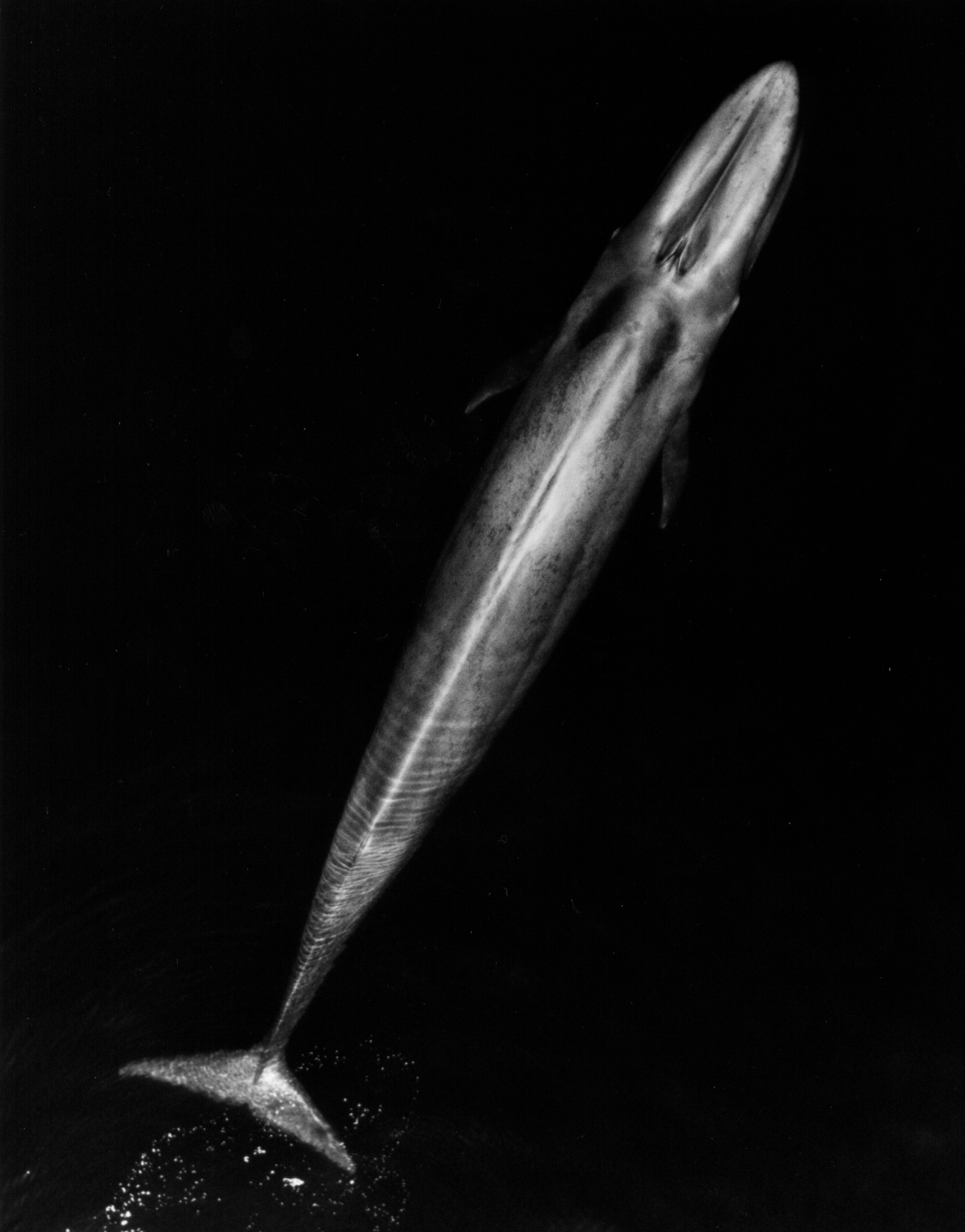
Aerial view of adult blue whale

- Northern subspecies (B. m. musculus)
  - North Atlantic population – This population is mainly documented from New England along eastern Canada to Greenland, particularly in the Gulf of St. Lawrence, during summer, though some individuals may remain there all year. They also aggregate near Iceland and have increased their presence in the Norwegian Sea. They are reported to migrate south to the West Indies, the Azores and northwest Africa.
  - Eastern North Pacific population – Whales in this region mostly feed off California's coast from summer to fall and then Oregon, Washington State, the Alaska Gyre and Aleutian Islands later in the fall. During winter and spring, blue whales migrate south to the waters of Mexico, mostly the Gulf of California, and the Costa Rica Dome, where they both feed and breed.
  - Central/Western Pacific population – This stock is documented around the Kamchatka Peninsula during the summer; some individuals may remain there year-round. They have been recorded wintering in Hawaiian waters, though some can be found in the Gulf of Alaska during fall and early winter.
- Northern Indian Ocean subspecies (B. m. indica) – This subspecies can be found year-round in the northwestern Indian Ocean, though some individuals have been recorded travelling to the Crozet Islands during between summer and fall.
- Pygmy blue whale (B. m. brevicauda)
  - Madagascar population – This population migrates between the Seychelles and Amirante Islands in the north and the Crozet Islands and Prince Edward Islands in the south where they feed, passing through the Mozambique Channel.
  - Australia/Indonesia population – Whales in this region appear to winter off Indonesia and migrate to their summer feeding grounds off the coast of Western Australia, with major concentrations at Perth Canyon and an area stretching from the Great Australian Bight and Bass Strait.
  - Eastern Australia/New Zealand population – This stock may reside in the Tasman Sea and the Lau Basin in winter and feed mostly in the South Taranaki Bight and off the coast of eastern North Island. Blue whales have been detected around New Zealand throughout the year.
- Antarctic subspecies (B. m. intermedia) – This subspecies includes all populations found around the Antarctic. They have been recorded to travel as far north as the Eastern Tropical Pacific, the central Indian Ocean, and the waters of southwestern Australia and northern New Zealand.

Blue whales off the Chilean coast might be a separate subspecies based on their geographic separation, genetics, and unique song types. Chilean blue whales might overlap in the Eastern Tropical Pacific with Antarctica blue whales and Eastern North Pacific blue whales. Chilean blue whales are genetically differentiated from Antarctica blue whales such that interbreeding is unlikely. However, the genetic distinction is less between them and the Eastern North Pacific blue whale, hence there might be gene flow between the Southern and Northern Hemispheres. A 2019 study by Luis Pastene, Jorge Acevedo and Trevor Branch provided new morphometric data from a survey of 60 Chilean blue whales, hoping to address the debate about the possible distinction of this population from others in the Southern Hemisphere. Data from this study, based on whales collected in the 1965/1966 whaling season, shows that both the maximum and mean body length of Chilean blue whales lies between these values in pygmy and Antarctic blue whales. Data also indicates a potential difference in snout-eye measurements between the three, and a significant difference in fluke-anus length between the Chilean population and pygmy blue whales. This further confirms Chilean blue whales as a separate population, and implies that they do not fall under the same subspecies as the pygmy blue whale (B. m. brevicauda).

A 2024 genomic study of the global blue whale population found support for the subspecific status of Antarctic and Indo-western Pacific blue whales but not eastern Pacific blue whales. The study found "...divergence between the eastern North and eastern South Pacific, and among the eastern Indian Ocean, the western South Pacific and the northern Indian Ocean." and "no divergence within the Antarctic".

== Description ==
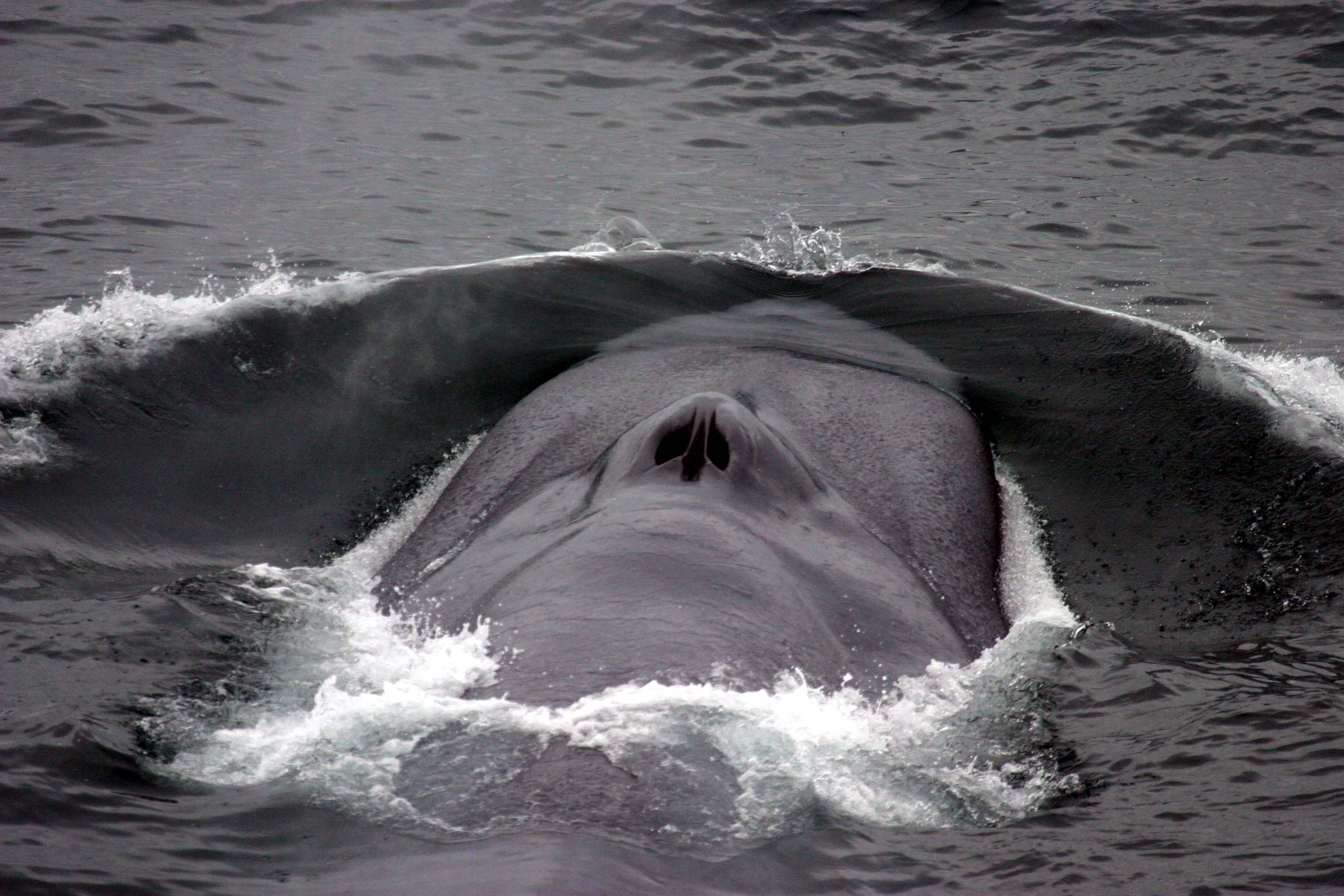
A blue whale with its bow wave, showing the blowholes

The blue whale is a slender-bodied cetacean with a broad U-shaped head; thin, elongated flippers; a small sickle-shaped dorsal fin located close to the tail, and a large tail stock at the root of the wide and thin flukes. The upper jaw is lined with 70–400 black baleen plates less than 1 m (3.3 ft) in length. The throat region has 60–88 grooves which allows the skin to expand during feeding. It has two blowholes that can squirt 9.1–12 m (30–39 ft) up in the air. The skin has a mottled grayish-blue coloration, appearing blue underwater. The mottling patterns near the dorsal fin vary between individuals. The underbelly has lighter pigmentation and can appear yellowish due to diatoms in the water, which historically earned them the nickname "sulphur bottom". Some albino individuals can be completely white.

=== Size ===
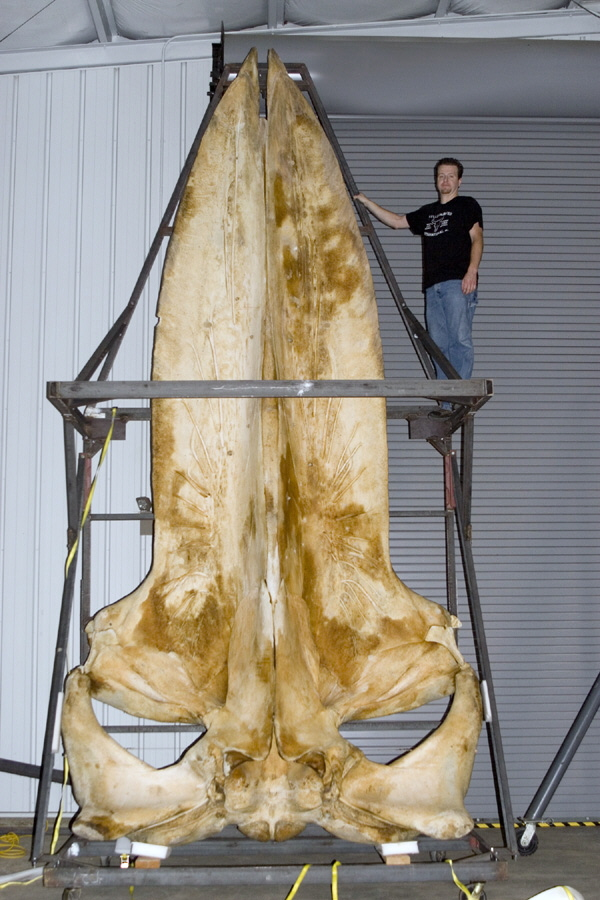
A blue whale skull measuring 5.79 m (19.0 ft)

The blue whale is the largest animal known ever to have existed. Some studies have estimated that certain shastasaurid ichthyosaurs and the ancient whale Perucetus could have rivalled the blue whale in size, with Perucetus actually being heavier with a mean weight of 180 t (180 long tons; 200 short tons). However, these estimates were based on fragmentary remains, and the proposed size for Perucetus was disputed by studies in 2024. Other studies estimate that, on land, large sauropods like Bruhathkayosaurus (mean weight: 110–170 tons) and Maraapunisaurus (mean weight: 80–120 tons) might have rivalled the blue whale, with the former even exceeding the blue whale based on its most liberal estimates (240 tons). However, these estimates were based on even more fragmentary specimens that had disintegrated by the time estimates could be made.

The International Whaling Commission (IWC) whaling database reports 88 individuals longer than 30 m (98 ft), including one of 33 m (108 ft). The record length was measured at 33.6 m (110 ft). The Discovery Committee reported lengths up to 31 m (102 ft). The longest blue whale ever scientifically measured was an individual captured in the Panama Canal; an examination of its cervical vertebrae confirmed that its length had not been exaggerated, and it measured 29.9 m (98 ft) from the tip of its snout to the tip of its tail. McClain et al. (2015) and Paul and Larramendi (2025) noted that blue whales up to 30.5 m (100 ft) in length may exist. Female blue whales are larger than males. Hydrodynamic models suggest a blue whale could not exceed 33 m (108 ft) because of metabolic and energy constraints. The existence of blue whales exceeding 30.5 m (100 ft) in length has been questioned.

The average length of sexually mature female blue whales is 22.0 m (72.1 ft) for Eastern North Pacific blue whales, 24 m (79 ft) for central and western North Pacific blue whales, 21–24 m (68–78 ft) for North Atlantic blue whales, 25.4–26.6 m (83.4–87.3 ft) for Antarctic blue whales, 23.5 m (77.1 ft) for Chilean blue whales, and 21.3 m (69.9 ft) for pygmy blue whales. Length measurements of blue whales in the Gulf of California suggest a mean length of 20.49 m (67.2 ft) and a maximum length of 29.01 m (95.2 ft), which is comparable to Northeast Pacific blue whales. The maximum length of the individual is estimated by another estimate to be between 27.53–30.50 m (90.3–100.1 ft), with a probability of 0.95.

In the Northern Hemisphere, males weigh an average 100 t (220,000 lb) and females 112 t (247,000 lb). Eastern North Pacific blue whale males average 88.5 t (195,000 lb) and females 100 t (220,000 lb). Antarctic males average 112 t (247,000 lb) and females 130 t (290,000 lb). Pygmy blue whale males average 83.5 t (184,000 lb) to 99 t (218,000 lb). The average weight of an adult blue whale is between 72–135 t (71–133 long tons; 79–149 short tons). The weight of the heart of a stranded North Atlantic blue whale was 180 kg (400 lb), the largest known in any animal. The brain of a blue whale, which weighed 50.9 t (112,000 lb), weighed about 3.636 kg (8.02 lb). The record-holder female blue whale was caught in the Southern Ocean on 20 March 1947, and was recorded as measuring 27.6 m (91 ft) long and weighing 190 t (190 long tons; 210 short tons), with estimates of up to 199 t (196 long tons; 219 short tons). The longest Antarctic blue whale ever scientifically measured was 29.5 m (97 ft) long and weighed 163 t (160 long tons; 180 short tons); its estimated body weight, including fluid loss, was 178 t (175 long tons; 196 short tons).

In 2024, Motani and Pyenson calculated the body mass of blue whales at different lengths, compiling records of their sizes from previous academic literatures and using regression analyses and volumetric analyses. A 25 m (82 ft) long individual was estimated to weigh approximately 101–119 t (111–131 short tons), while a 30 m (98 ft) long individual was estimated to weigh approximately 184–205 t (203–226 short tons). Considering that the largest blue whale was indeed 33 m (108 ft) long, they estimated that a blue whale of such length would have weighed approximately 252–273 t (278–301 short tons). In 2025, Paul and Larramendi estimated that blue whales could exceed 200 t (220 short tons), but likely not by as much as Motani and Pyenson documented.

During the harvest of a female blue whale in 1922, Messrs. Irvin and Johnson collected a fetus that is now 70% preserved and used for educational purposes. Some shrinkage may have occurred, making visualization of some features fairly difficult. Nonetheless, it indicates that a blue whale fetus is approximately 133 mm long at the juncture between the embryonic and fetal phases of development. This fetus represents the youngest specimen recorded.

The male blue whale has the largest penis in the animal kingdom, at around 3 m (9.8 ft) long and 12 in (30 cm) wide.

=== Life span ===
Blue whales live around 80–90 years or more. Scientists look at a blue whale's earwax or ear plug to estimate its age. Each year, a light and dark layer of wax is laid corresponding with fasting during migration and feeding time. Each set is thus an indicator of age. The oldest blue whale discovered using this method was found to be 110 years old. The maximum age of a pygmy blue whale determined this way is 73 years. Long-term identification studies in the Northeast Pacific suggest that they live for at least 40–45 years. In addition, female blue whales develop scars or corpora albicantia on their ovaries every time they ovulate. In a female pygmy blue whale, one corpus albicans is formed on average every 2.6 years.

== Behavior and ecology ==
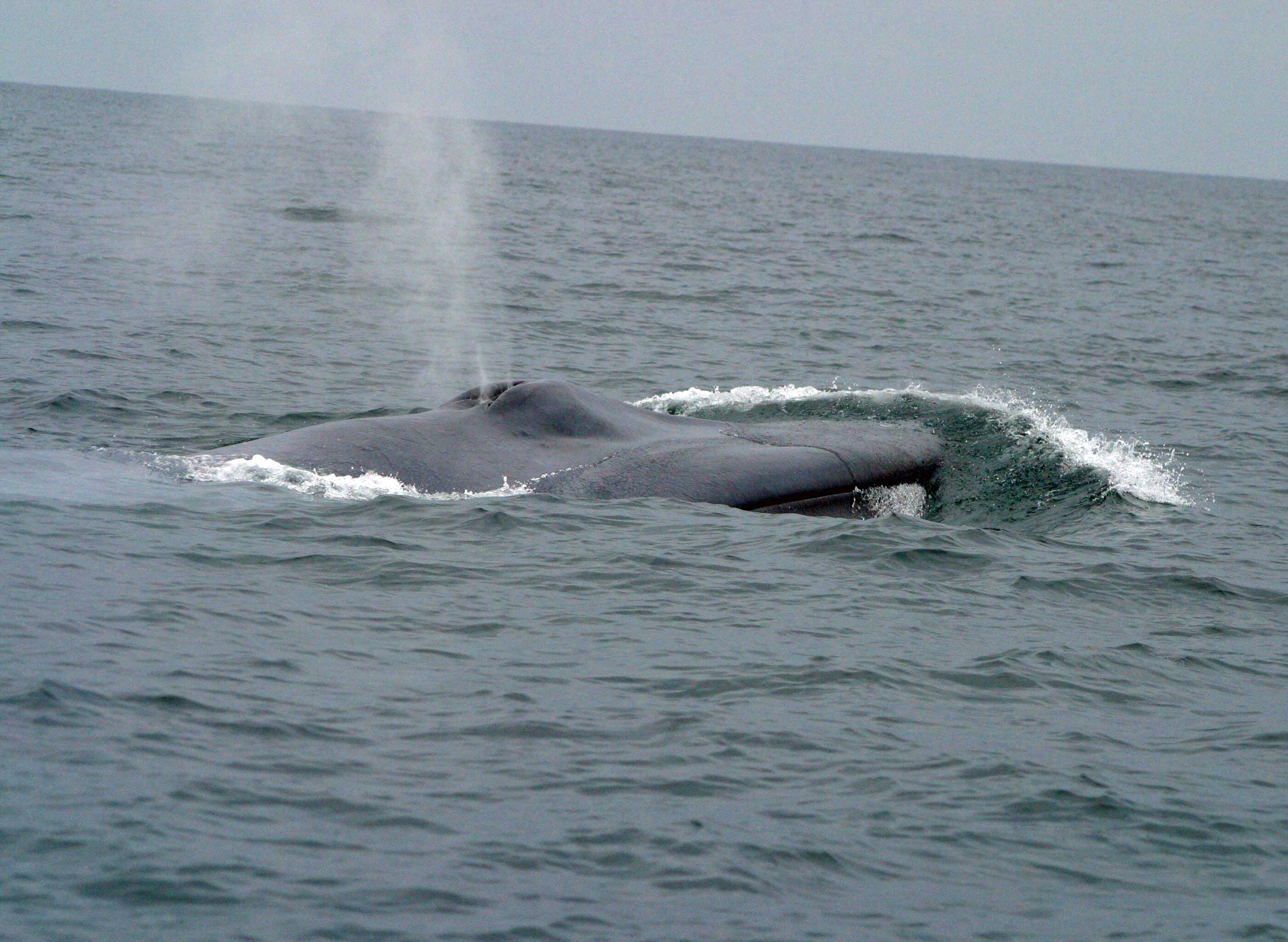
The blow of a blue whale

The blue whale is usually solitary, but can be found in pairs. When productivity is high enough, blue whales can be seen in gatherings of more than 50 individuals. Populations may go on long migrations, traveling to their summer feeding grounds towards the poles and then heading to their winter breeding grounds in more equatorial waters. The animals appear to use memory to locate the best feeding areas. There is evidence of alternative strategies, such as year-round residency, and partial (where only some individuals migrate) or age/sex-based migration. Some whales have been recorded feeding in breeding grounds.

Blue whale typically swim at 2–8 km/h (1.2–5.0 mph) but may swim faster at 32–48 km/h (20–30 mph) during encounters with boats, predators or other individuals. In 2020, Paolo and colleagues noted that if a large blue whale were to breach along a trajectory similar to that of a humpback whale, it would need to swim at a speed of 10.9 m/s (39 km/h; 24 mph) to achieve the same rate of surfacing; however, they argued that this would require approximately four times the energy and a higher power-to-mass ratio, making it unclear whether the blue whale could actually reach such speeds. They also noted that a blue whale in 'racing' mode can momentarily reach speeds of approximately 7.5 m/s (27 km/h; 17 mph), which they considered the most accurate estimate of the maximum swimming speed a blue whale can achieve. The maximum speed derived from satellite tracking data was 5.3 m/s (19 km/h; 12 mph). Their massive size limits their ability to breach.

The greatest dive depth reported from tagged blue whales was 315 m (1,033 ft). Their theoretical aerobic dive limit was estimated at 31.2 minutes, but the longest dive measured was 15.2 minutes. The deepest confirmed dive from a pygmy blue whale was 506 m (1,660 ft). A blue whale's heart rate can drop to 2 beats per minute (bpm) at deep depths, but upon surfacing, can rise to 37 bpm, which is close to its peak heart rate.

=== Diet and feeding ===
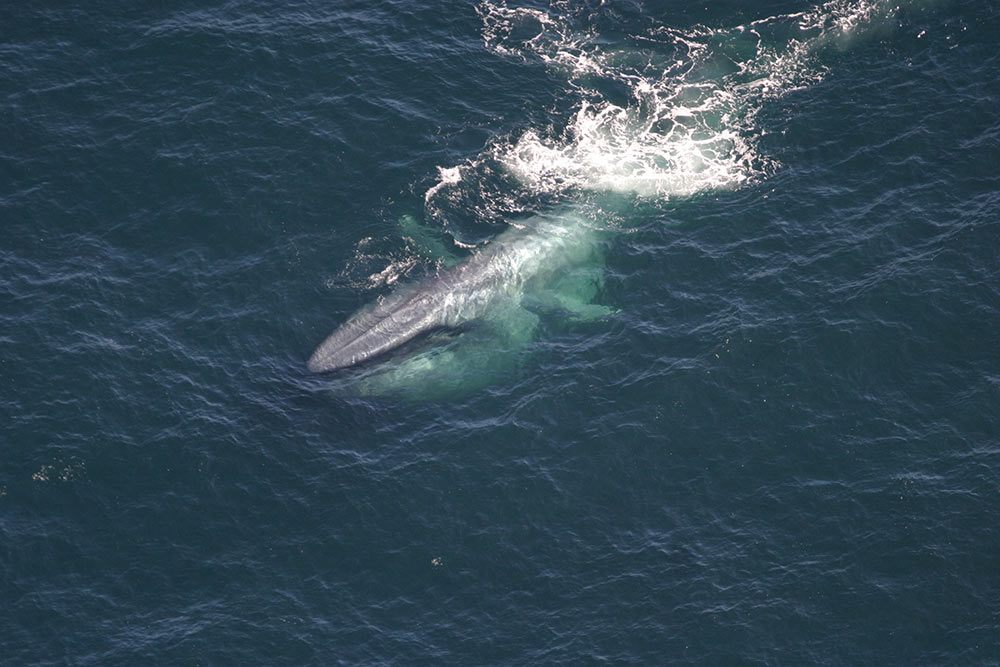
Blue whale near the surface after feeding

The blue whale's diet consists almost exclusively of krill, which they capture through lunge feeding, where they swim towards krill at high speeds with their mouths open up to 80 degrees. They may engulf 220 t (220 long tons; 240 short tons) of water at one time. They squeeze the water out through their baleen plates with pressure from the throat pouch and tongue, and swallow the remaining krill. Blue whales have been recorded making 180° rolls during lunge-feeding, possibly allowing them to search the prey field and find the densest patches.

While pursuing krill patches, blue whales maximize their calorie intake by increasing the number of lunges while selecting the thickest patches. This provides them enough energy for everyday activities while storing additional energy necessary for migration and reproduction. Due to their size blue whales have larger energetic demands than most animals, resulting in their need for this specific feeding habit. Blue whales have to engulf densities greater than 100 krill/m^{3} to maintain the cost of lunge feeding. They can consume 34,776–1,912,680 kJ (8,312–457,141 kcal) from one mouthful of krill, which can provide up to 240 times more energy than used in a single lunge. It is estimated that an average-sized blue whale must consume 1,120 ± 359 kg (2,469 ± 791 lb) of krill a day. On average, a blue whale eats 4 t (3.9 long tons; 4.4 short tons) each day.

In the southern ocean, blue whales feed on Antarctic krill (Euphausia superba). In the South Australia, pygmy blue whales (B. m. brevicauda) feeds on Nyctiphanes australis. In California, they feed mostly on Thysanoessa spinifera, but also less commonly on North pacific krill (Euphausia pacifica). Research of the Eastern North Pacific population shows that when diving to feed on krill, the whales reach an average depth of 201 m (659 ft), with dives lasting 9.8 minutes on average.

While most blue whales feed almost exclusively on krill, the Northern Indian Ocean subspecies (B. m. indica) instead feeds predominantly on sergestid shrimp. To do so, they dive deeper and for longer periods of time than blue whales in other regions of the world, with dives of 10.7 minutes on average, and a hypothesized dive depth of about 300 m (980 ft). Fecal analysis also found the presence of fish, krill, amphipods, cephalopods, and scyphozoan jellyfish in their diet.

Blue whales appear to avoid directly competing with other baleen whales. Different whale species select different feeding spaces and times as well as different prey species. In the Southern Ocean, baleen whales appear to feed on Antarctic krill of different sizes, which may lessen competition between them.

Blue whale feeding habits may differ due to situational disturbances, like environmental shifts or human interference. This can cause a change in diet due to stress response. Due to these changing situations, there was a study performed on blue whales measuring cortisol levels and comparing them with the levels of stressed individuals, it gave a closer look to the reasoning behind their diet and behavioral changes.

=== Reproduction and birth ===
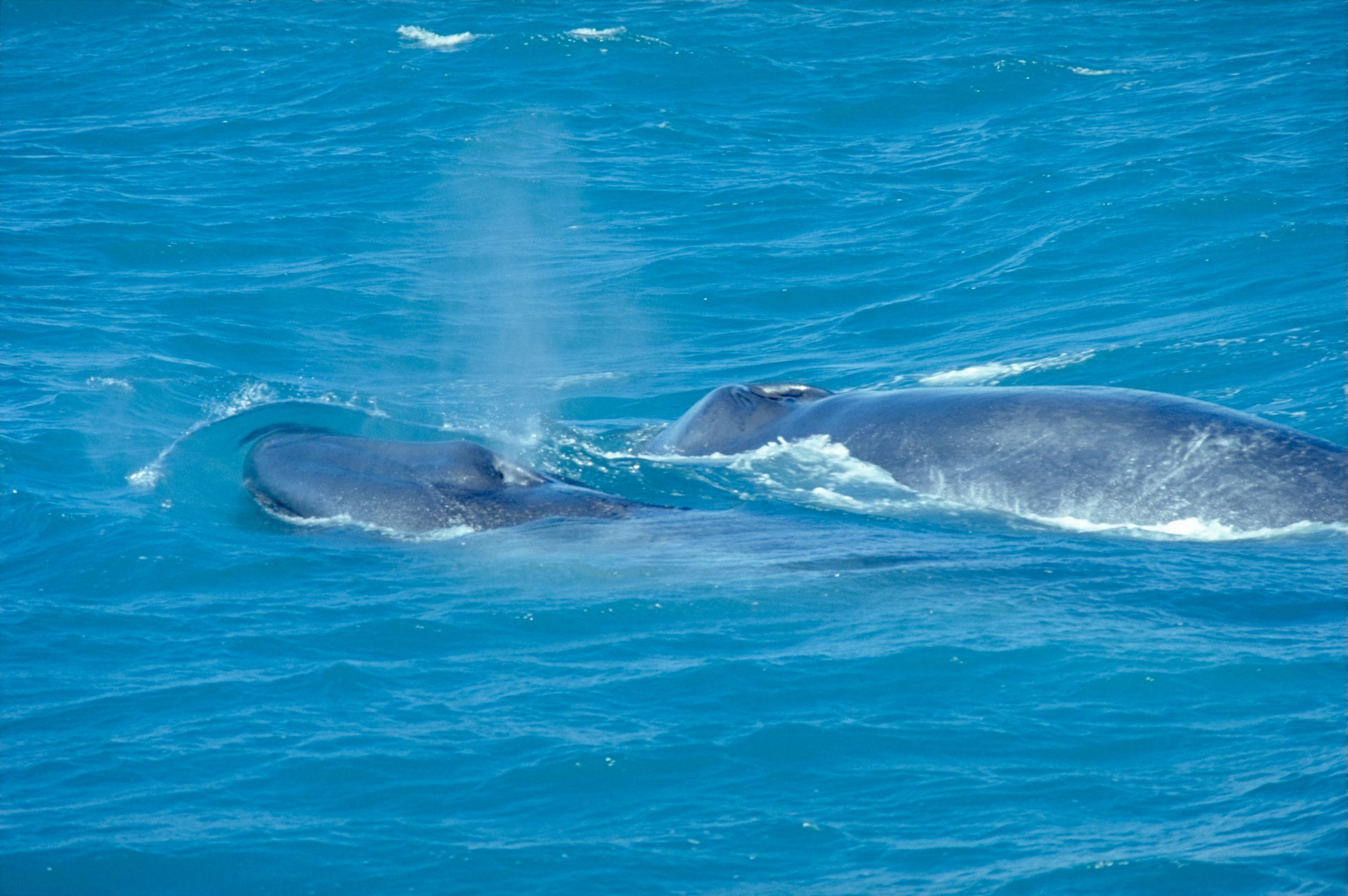
A blue whale calf with its mother

The age of sexual maturity in blue whales is thought to be between 5 and 15 years, with females reaching an average of 10 years and males reaching an average of 12 years. In the Northern Hemisphere, the length at which they reach maturity is 21–23 m (69–75 ft) for females and 20–21 m (66–69 ft) for males. In the Southern Hemisphere, the length of maturity is 23–24 m (75–79 ft) and 22 m (72 ft) for females and males, respectively. Male pygmy blue whales average 18.7 m (61.4 ft) at sexual maturity. Female pygmy blue whales are 21.0–21.7 m (68.9–71.2 ft) in length and roughly 10 years old at the age of sexual maturity. Since corpora are added every ~2.5 years after sexual maturity, physical maturity is assumed to occur at 35 years. Little is known about mating behavior, or breeding and birthing areas. Blue whales appear to be polygynous, with males competing for females. A male blue whale typically trails a female and will fight off potential rivals. The species mates from fall to winter.

Pregnant females eat roughly four percent of their body weight daily, amounting to 60% of their overall body weight throughout summer foraging periods. Gestation may last 10–12 months, with calves being 6–7 m (20–23 ft) long and weighing 2–3 t (2.0–3.0 long tons; 2.2–3.3 short tons) at birth. Estimates suggest that because calves require 2–4 kg (4.4–8.8 lb) milk per kg of mass gained, blue whales likely produce 220 kg (490 lb) of milk per day (ranging from 110 to 320 kg (240 to 710 lb) of milk per day). The first video of a calf thought to be nursing was filmed in New Zealand in 2016. Calves may be weaned when they reach 6–8 months old at a length of 16 m (53 ft). A newborn blue whale calf gains approximately 90 kg (200 lb) per day. They gain roughly 17,000 kg (37,500 lb) during the weaning period. Interbirth periods last two to three years; they average 2.6 years in pygmy blue whales. Mother–calf pairings are infrequently observed, and this may be due to mothers birthing and weaning their young in-between their entry and return to their summer feeding grounds.

=== Vocalizations ===
A blue whale song
Recorded in the Atlantic (1)

A blue whale song
Recorded in the Atlantic (2)

A blue whale song
Recorded in North Eastern Pacific

A blue whale song
Recorded in the South Pacific

A blue whale song
Recorded in the West Pacific

Blue whales produce some of the loudest and lowest frequency vocalizations in the animal kingdom, and their inner ears appear well adapted for detecting low-frequency sounds. The fundamental frequency for blue whale vocalizations ranges from 8 to 25 Hz. The maximum loudness is 188 dB. Blue whale songs vary between populations.

Vocalizations produced by the Eastern North Pacific population have been well studied. This population produces pulsed calls ("A") and tonal calls ("B"), upswept tones that precede type B calls ("C") and separate downswept tones ("D"). A and B calls are often produced in repeated co-occurring sequences and sung only by males, suggesting a reproductive function. D calls may have multiple functions. They are produced by both sexes during social interactions while feeding, as well as by males when competing for mates.

Blue whale calls recorded off Sri Lanka have a three-unit phrase. The first unit is a 19.8 to 43.5 Hz pulsive call, and is normally 17.9 ± 5.2 seconds long. The second unit is a 55.9 to 72.4 Hz FM upsweep that is 13.8 ± 1.1 seconds long. The final unit is 28.5 ± 1.6 seconds long with a tone of 108 to 104.7 Hz. A blue whale call recorded off Madagascar, a two-unit phrase, consists of 5–7 pulses with a center frequency of 35.1 ± 0.7 Hz lasting 4.4 ± 0.5 seconds proceeding a 35 ± 0 Hz tone that is 10.9 ± 1.1 seconds long. In the Southern Ocean, blue whales produce 18-second vocals which start with a 9-second-long, 27 Hz tone, and then a 1-second downsweep to 19 Hz, followed by a downsweep further to 18 Hz. Other vocalizations include 1–4 second long, frequency-modulated calls with a frequency of 80 and 38 Hz.

There is evidence that some blue whale songs have temporally declined in tonal frequency. The vocalization of blue whales in the Eastern North Pacific decreased in tonal frequency by 31% from the early 1960s to the early 21st century. The frequency of pygmy blue whales in the Antarctic has decreased by a few tenths of a hertz every year starting in 2002. It is possible that as blue whale populations recover from whaling, there is increasing sexual selection pressure (i.e., a lower frequency indicates a larger body size). In February 2025, a study tracing "more than six years of acoustic monitoring" off of California, researchers found that during a heatwave, the blue whales were vocalizing less often, potentially due to needing to spend their energy trying to find food that is increasingly scarce due to the effects of climate change. A June 2022 study suggested that the decline in song frequency in blue whales is simply a cultural phenomenon.

=== Predators ===
There is no well-documented natural predator of blue whales. The only documented attacks on blue whales involve orcas. Because killing a blue whale requires considerable effort and coordination, orcas often target calves. The rate of fatal attacks by orcas is unknown.

Photograph-identification studies of blue whales have estimated that a number of the individuals in the Gulf of California have rake-like scars, indicative of encounters with orcas. Off southeastern Australia, 3.7% of blue whales photographed had rake marks and 42.1% of photographed pygmy blue whales off Western Australia had rake marks. A blue whale mother and calf were first observed being chased at high speeds by orcas off southeastern Australia. The first documented attack occurred in 1977 off southwestern Baja California, Mexico, but the injured whale escaped after five hours. Four more blue whales were documented as being chased by a group of orcas between 1982 and 2003. In September 2003, a group of orcas in the Eastern Tropical Pacific was encountered feeding on a recently killed blue whale calf. In March 2014, a commercial whale watch boat operator recorded an incident involving a group of orcas harassing a blue whale in Monterey Bay. The blue whale defended itself by slapping its tail. A similar incident was recorded by a drone in Monterey Bay in May 2017. The first direct observations of orca attacks occurred off the south coast of Western Australia, two in 2019 and one more in 2021. The first victim was estimated to be an adult between 18–22 m (59–72 ft).

=== Infestations and health threats ===
In Antarctic waters, blue whales accumulate diatoms of the species Cocconeis ceticola and the genera Navicola, which are normally removed when the whales enter warmer waters. Barnacles such as Coronula diadema, Coronula reginae, and Cryptolepas rhachianecti, latch on to whale skin deep enough to leave behind a pit if removed. Whale lice species make their home in cracks of the skin and are relatively harmless. The copepod species Pennella balaenopterae digs in and attaches itself to the blubber to feed on. Intestinal parasites include the trematode genera Ogmogaster and Lecithodesmus; the tapeworm genera Priapocephalus, Phyllobotrium, Tetrabothrius, Diphyllobotrium, and Diplogonoporus; and the thorny-headed worm genus Bolbosoma. In the North Atlantic, blue whales also contain the protozoans Entamoeba, Giardia and Balantidium.

== Conservation ==
The global blue whale population is estimated to be 5,000–15,000 mature individuals and 10,000–25,000 total as of 2015–2018. By comparison, there were at least 140,000 mature whales in 1926. There are an estimated total of 1,000–3,000 whales in the North Atlantic, 3,000–5,000 in the North Pacific, and 5,000–8,000 in the Antarctic. There are possibly 1,000–3,000 whales in the eastern South Pacific while the pygmy blue whale may number 2,000–5,000 individuals. Blue whales have been protected in areas of the Southern Hemisphere since 1939. In 1955, they were given complete protection in the North Atlantic under the International Convention for the Regulation of Whaling; this protection was extended to the Antarctic in 1965 and the North Pacific in 1966. The protected status of North Atlantic blue whales was not recognized by Iceland until 1960. In the United States, the species is protected under the Endangered Species Act. It is highly likely that the global blue whale population has increased over the past few decades.

Blue whales are formally classified as endangered under both the U.S. Endangered Species Act and the IUCN Red List. They are also listed on Appendix I under the Convention on International Trade in Endangered Species of Wild Fauna and Flora (CITES) and the Convention on the Conservation of Migratory Species of Wild Animals. Although, for some populations, there is not enough information on current abundance trends (e.g., pygmy blue whales), others are critically endangered (e.g., Antarctic blue whales).

=== Threats ===
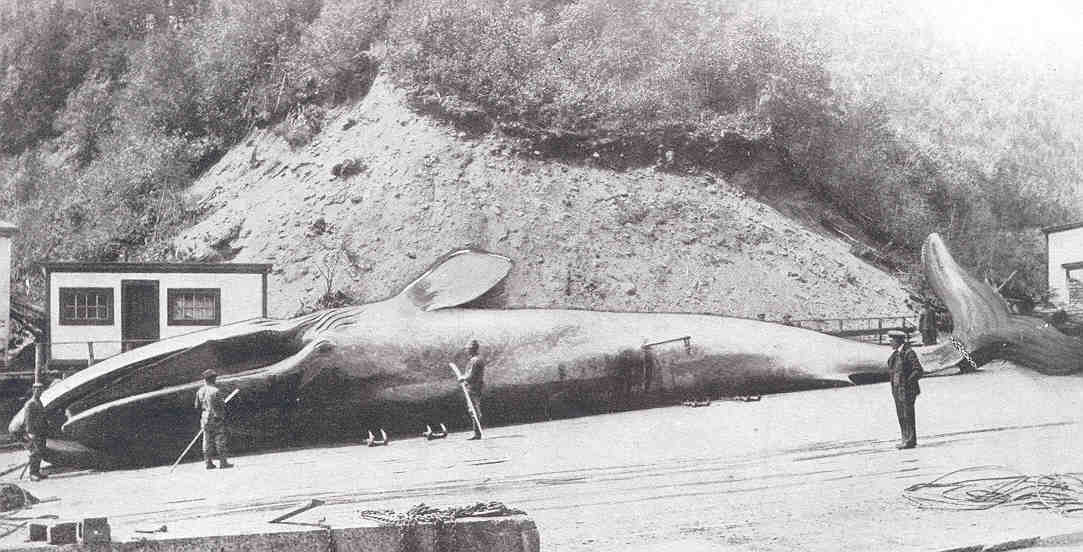
Dead blue whale on flensing platform

In 2017, DNA evidence was used to identify whale bones at Icelandic archaeological sites. Of the 124 bones analyzed more than 50% were from blue whales and some dated as far back as 900 CE. This, and other evidence, suggests that Icelanders were hunting whales as early as the 9th century, just as the settlement of Iceland began. Thus Icelanders would have been among the earliest known humans to hunt the blue whale.

Blue whales were initially difficult to hunt because of their size and speed. This began to change in the mid-19th century with the development of harpoons that can be shot as projectiles. Blue whale whaling peaked between 1930 and 1931 with 30,000 animals taken. Harvesting of the species was particularly high in the Antarctic, with 350,000–360,000 whales taken in the first half of the 20th century. In addition, 11,000 North Atlantic whales (mostly around Iceland) and 9,500 North Pacific whales were killed during the same period. The International Whaling Commission banned all hunting of blue whales in 1966 and gave them worldwide protection. However, the Soviet Union continued to illegally hunt blue whales and other species up until the 1970s.

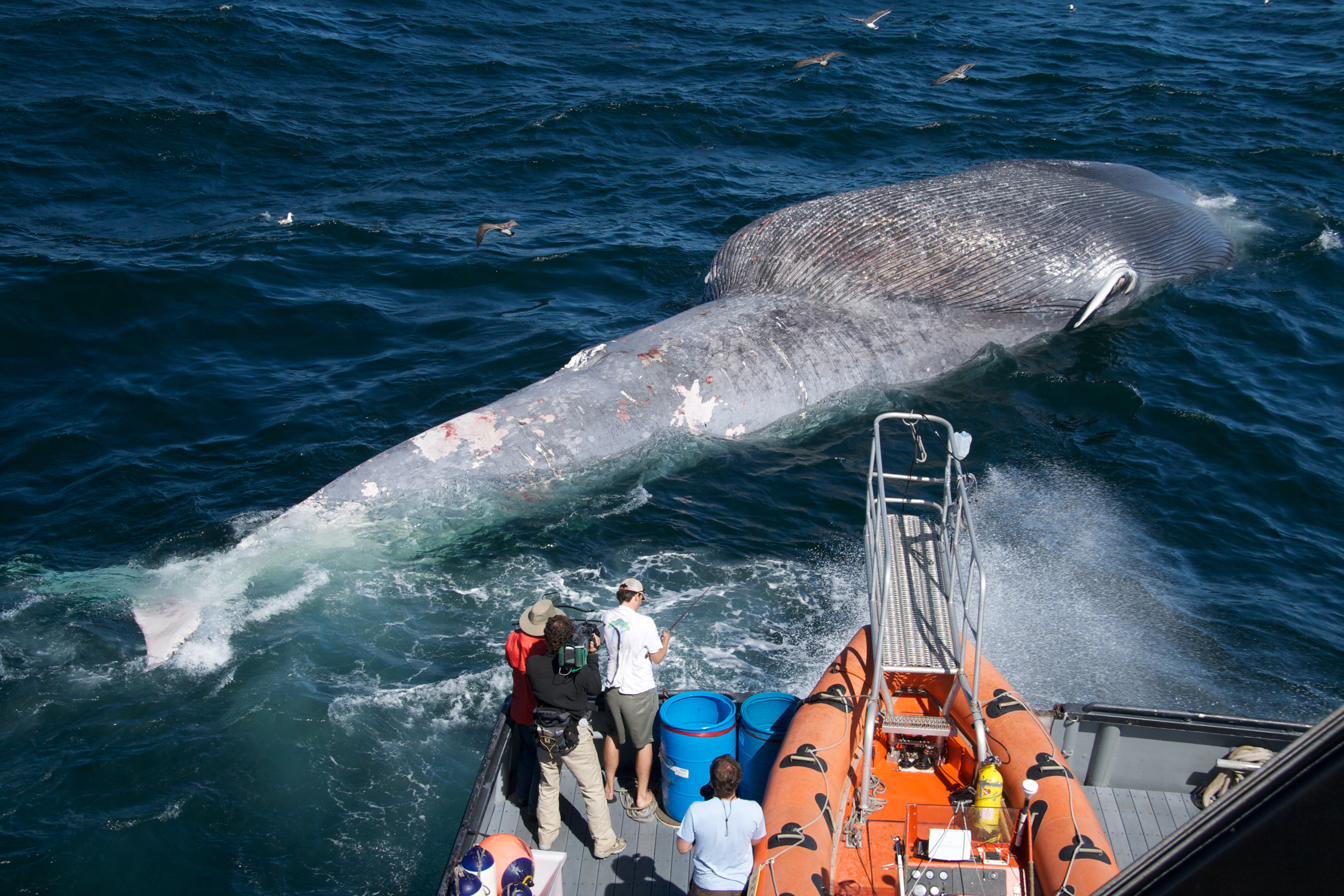
Researchers examine a dead blue whale killed by collision with a ship

Ship strikes are a significant mortality factor for blue whales, especially off the west coast of the United States. A total of 17 blue whales were killed or suspected to have been killed by ships between 1998 and 2019 off the U.S. West Coast. Five deaths in 2007 off California were considered an unusual mortality event, as defined under the Marine Mammal Protection Act. Lethal ship strikes are also a problem in Sri Lankan waters, where their habitat intersects with one of the world's most active shipping routes. Here, strikes caused the deaths of eleven blue whales in 2010 and 2012, and at least two in 2014. Ship-strike mortality claimed the lives of two blue whales off southern Chile in the 2010s. Possible measures for reducing future ship strikes include better predictive models of whale distribution, changes in shipping lanes, vessel speed reductions, and seasonal and dynamic management of shipping lanes. Few cases of blue whale entanglement in commercial fishing gear have been documented. The first report in the U.S. occurred off California in 2015, reportedly some type of deep-water trap/pot fishery. Three more entanglement cases were reported in 2016. In Sri Lanka, a blue whale was documented with a net wrapped through its mouth, along the sides of its body, and wound around its tail.

Increasing man-made underwater noise impacts blue whales. They may be exposed to noise from commercial shipping and seismic surveys as a part of oil and gas exploration. Blue whales in the Southern California Bight decreased calling in the presence of mid-frequency active (MFA) sonar. Exposure to simulated MFA sonar was found to interrupt blue whale deep-dive feeding, but no changes in behavior were observed in individuals feeding at shallower depths. The responses also depended on the animal's behavioral state, its (horizontal) distance from the sound source and the availability of prey.

The potential impacts of pollutants on blue whales is unknown. However, because blue whales feed low on the food chain, there is a lesser chance for bioaccumulation of organic chemical contaminants. Analysis of the earwax of a male blue whale killed by a collision with a ship off the coast of California showed contaminants like pesticides, flame retardants, and mercury. Reconstructed persistent organic pollutant (POP) profiles suggested that a substantial maternal transfer occurred during gestation and/or lactation. Male blue whales in the Gulf of St. Lawrence, Canada, were found to have higher concentrations of PCBs, dichlorodiphenyltrichloroethane (DDT), metabolites, and several other organochlorine compounds relative to females, reflecting maternal transfer of these persistent contaminants from females into young.

== See also ==
- Largest organisms
- List of cetaceans
- List of largest mammals
- List of whale vocalizations
- Blue whale penis
