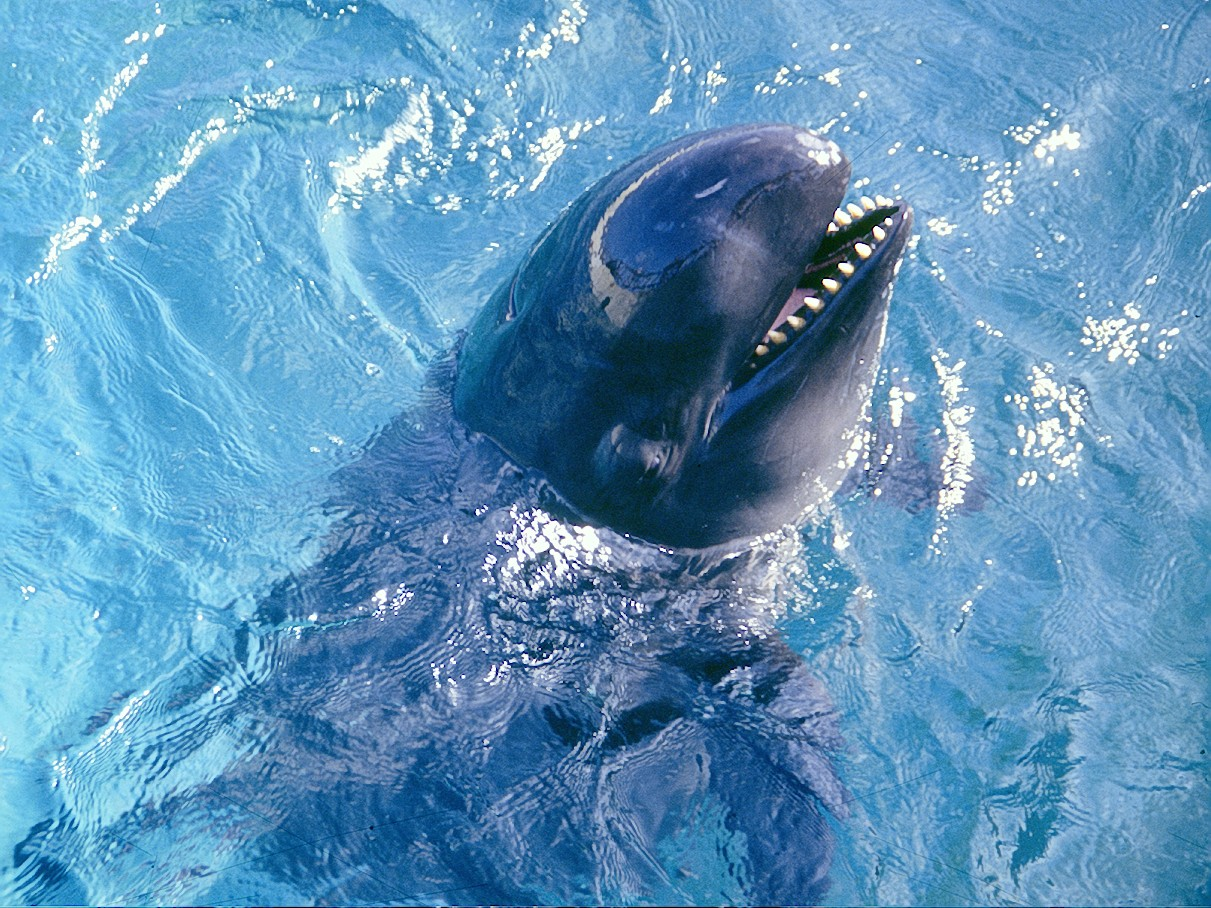

- Size compared to an average human

Conservation status
- Near Threatened (IUCN 3.1)
- CITES Appendix II

Scientific classification
- Kingdom: Animalia
- Phylum: Chordata
- Class: Mammalia
- Order: Artiodactyla
- Infraorder: Cetacea
- Family: Delphinidae
- Genus: Pseudorca
- Species: P. crassidens

Binomial name
- Pseudorca crassidens (Owen, 1846)
- Range of the false killer whale

Synonyms
- List of synonyms: Globicephalus grayi Burmeister, 1867; Orca crassidens Gray, 1846; Orca destructor Cope, 1866; Orca meridionalis Flower, 1865; Pseudorca crassidens meridionalis Deraniyagala, 1945; Pseudorca grayi Burmeister, 1872; Pseudorca mediterranea Giglioli, 1882; Pseudorca meridionalis Gray, 1866

= False killer whale =

False killer whale Temporal range: Middle Pleistocene–Recent

Species of oceanic dolphin in the genus Pseudorca

The false killer whale (Pseudorca crassidens) is a species of oceanic dolphin that is the only extant representative of the genus Pseudorca. It is found in oceans worldwide but mainly in tropical regions. It was first described in 1846 as a species of porpoise based on a skull, which was revised when the first carcasses were observed in 1861. The name "false killer whale" comes from having a skull similar to the orca or killer whale (Orcinus orca).

The false killer whale reaches a maximum length of 6 m (20 ft), though size can vary around the world. It is highly sociable, known to form pods of up to 50 members, and can also form pods with other dolphin species, such as the common bottlenose dolphin (Tursiops truncatus). It can form close bonds with other species, as well as have sexual interactions with them. The false killer whale has also been known to eat other dolphins, though it typically eats squid and fish. It is a deep-diver; maximum known depth is 927.5 m (3,043 ft); maximum speed is around 30 km/h (19 mph).

Several aquariums around the world keep one or more false killer whales, though its aggression toward other dolphins makes it less desirable. It is threatened by fishing operations, as it can entangle in fishing gear. It is drive hunted in some Japanese villages. The false killer whale has a tendency to mass-strand given its highly social nature; the largest stranding consisted of over 800 beached at Mar del Plata, Argentina, in 1946. Most of what is known of this species comes from examining stranded individuals.

== Taxonomy ==
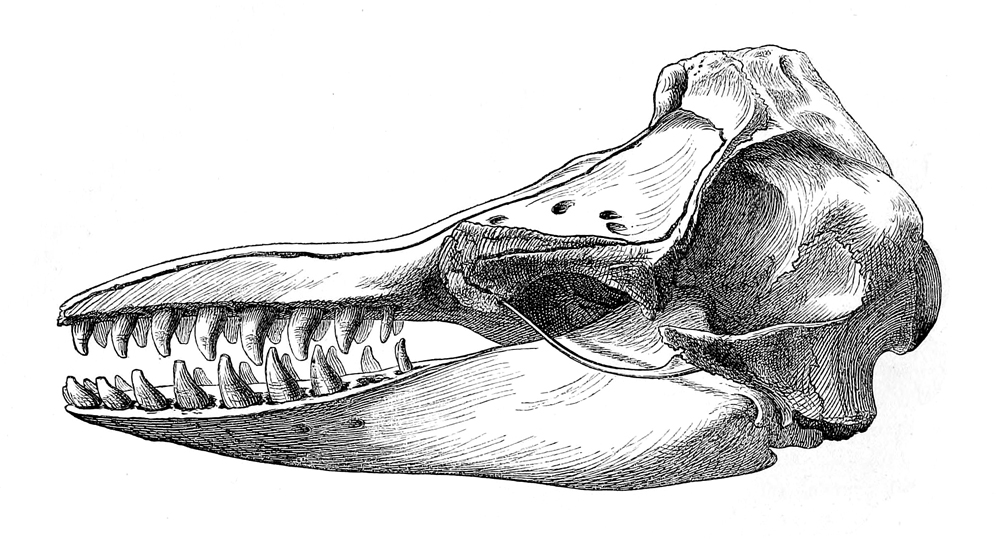
Illustration of the skull

The false killer whale was first described by British paleontologist and biologist Richard Owen in his 1846 book, A history of British fossil mammals and birds, based on a fossil skull discovered in 1843. This specimen was unearthed from the Lincolnshire Fens near Stamford in England, a subfossil deposited in a marine environment that existed around 126,000 years ago. The skull was reported as present in a number of museum collections, but noted as lost by William Henry Flower in 1884. Owen compared the skull to those of the long-finned pilot whale (Globicephala melas), beluga whale (Delphinapterus leucas), and Risso's dolphin (Grampus griseus)–in fact, he gave it the nickname "thick toothed grampus" in light of this and assigned the animal to the genus Phocaena (a genus of porpoises) which Risso's dolphin was also assigned to in 1846. The species name crassidens means "thick toothed".

In 1846, zoologist John Edward Gray put the false killer whale in the genus Orcinus, which had been known as the killer whale (Orcinus orca). Until 1861, when the first carcasses washed up on the shores of Kiel Bay, Denmark, the species was presumed extinct. Based on these and a pod that beached itself three months later in November, zoologist Johannes Theodor Reinhardt moved the species in 1862 to the newly erected genus Pseudorca, which established it as being neither a porpoise nor a killer whale. The name "false killer whale" comes from the apparent similarity between its skull and that of the killer whale.

The false killer whale is in the family Delphinidae (oceanic dolphins). It is in the subfamily Globicephalinae; its closest living relatives are Risso's dolphin, the melon-headed whale (Peponocephala electra), the pygmy killer whale (Feresa attenuata), pilot whales (Globicephala spp.), and possibly snubfin dolphins (Orcaella spp.). William Henry Flower suggested in 1884 and later abandoned a distinction between northern and southern false killer whales. Paules Edward Pieris Deraniyagala proposed a subspecies, P. c. meridionalis, in 1945, though without enough justification. There are currently no recognized subspecies. Still, individuals in populations around the world can have different skull structure and vary in average length with Japanese false killers found to be 10–20% larger than South African ones. It can hybridize with the bottlenose dolphin (Tursiops truncatus) to produce fertile offspring called "wholphins".

== Description ==
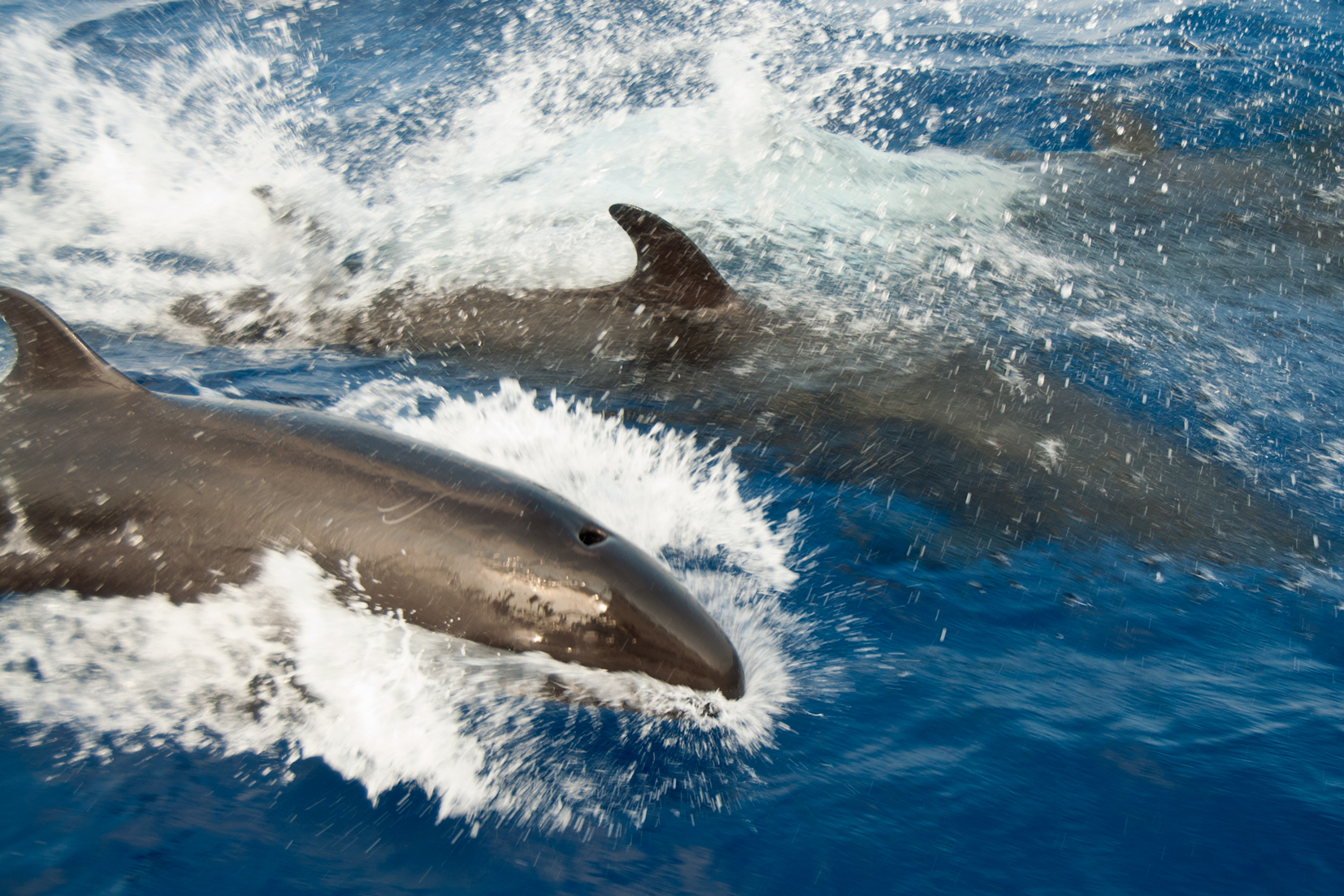
Pod of false killer whales

False killer whales are large marine predators. They are the fourth-largest extant species of oceanic dolphin, exceeded in size only by the orca and the two species of pilot whales. Males are about 10–15% larger than females: females reach a maximum size of 4.5–5 m (15–16 ft) in length and 1,200 kg (2,600 lb) in weight, and males 6 m (20 ft) long and 2,200 kg (4,900 lb). Newborns can be 1.5–2.1 m (5–7 ft) long. Coloration is black or dark gray, slightly lighter on the underside. The body is slender with an elongated, tapered head without a beak. The dorsal fin is sickle-shaped; the flippers are narrow, short, and pointed, with a distinctive bulge on the leading edge of the flipper. Body temperature ranges from 36–37.2 °C (96.8–99.0 °F), increasing during activity. The teeth are conical; there are 14–21 in the upper jaw and 16–24 in the lower.

A false killer whale reaches physical maturity at 8 to 14 years; maximum age in captivity is 57 years for males and 62 for females. Sexual maturity happens at 8 to 11 years. In one population, calving was at 7-year intervals; calving can occur year-round, though it usually occurs in late winter. Gestation takes ~15 months; lactation, 9 months to 2 years. The false killer and pilot whales have a sizable lifespan after menopause, which typically occurs between 45 and 55. As a toothed whale, a false killer can echolocate to navigate and find prey, using its melon organ in the forehead to create sound. The melon is larger in males than in females.

== Behavior ==
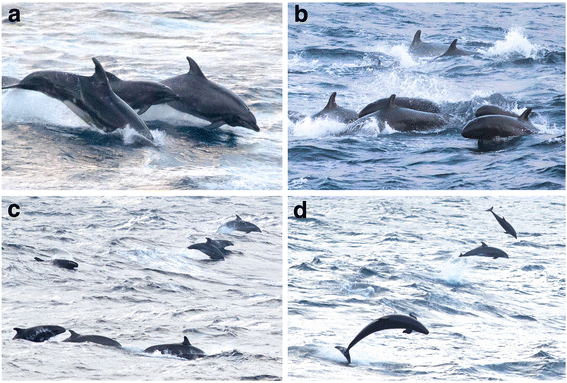
Mixed-species pod of common bottlenose dolphins (Tursiops truncatus) and false killer whales

The false killer whale has been known to interact non-aggressively with some dolphins: the common bottlenose dolphin, the Pacific white-sided dolphin (Lagenorhynchus obliquidens), the rough-toothed dolphin (Steno bredanensis), the pilot whales, the melon-headed whale, the pantropical spotted dolphin (Stenella attenuata), the pygmy killer whale, and Risso's dolphin. They have been shown to engage in depredation at fisheries with killer whales (Orcinus orca), though their diets differ with the killer whales and false killer whales preferring swordfish and smaller fish respectively.

A false killer may respond to distress calls and protect other species from predators, aid in childbirth by helping to remove the afterbirth, and has been known to interact sexually with bottlenose dolphins (see Wholphin) and pilot whales, including homosexually. It has been known to form mixed-species pods with those dolphins, probably due to shared feeding grounds. In Japan, these only occur in winter, suggesting it is tied to seasonal food shortages.

A pod near Chile had a 15 km/h (9.3 mph) cruising speed, and false killer whales in captivity were recorded to have a maximum speed of 7.46 m/s (26.9 km/h; 16.7 mph), similar to a bottlenose dolphin. The speed of a pod of false killer whales was reported to be about 30 km/h (19 mph). Diving behavior is not well recorded, but one individual near Japan dove for 12 minutes to a depth of 230 m (750 ft). In Japan, one individual had a documented dive of 600 m (2,000 ft), and one in Hawaii 927.5 m (3,043 ft), comparable to pilot whales and other similarly sized dolphins. Its maximum dive time is likely 18.5 minutes.

The false killer travels in large pods, evidenced by mass strandings; usually 10 to 20 members, though these smaller groups can be part of larger groups; it is highly social and can travel in groups of more than 500 whales. These large groups may break up into smaller family groups of 4 to 6 members while feeding. Members stay with the pod long-term, some recorded as 15 years, and, indicated by mass strandings, share strong bonds with other members. They are thought to have a matrifocal family structure, with mothers heading the pod instead of the father, like in sperm whales and pilot whales. Different populations around the world have different vocalizations, similar to other dolphins. The false killer whale is probably polygynous, with males mating with multiple females.

== Ecology ==
False killer whale breaching

The false killer whale is an active predator, inhabiting tropical and subtropical waters. Generally, the false killer whale targets a wide array of squid and fish of various sizes during daylight hours. They typically target large species of fish, such as mahi-mahi, wahoo and tuna. They are also known to prey on marine mammals, such as some species of dolphins and whales. In captivity, it eats 3.4 to 4.3% of its body weight per day. A video taken in 2016 near Sydney shows a group hunting a juvenile shark. It sometimes discards the tail, gills, and stomach of captured fish, and pod members have been known to share food.

In the Eastern Pacific, the false killer whale has been known to target smaller dolphins during tuna purse-seine fishing operations; there are attacks on sperm whales (Physeter macrocephalus), and one instance against a humpback whale (Megaptera novaeangliae) calf. Killer whales are known to prey on the false killer, and it also possibly faces a threat from large sharks, though there are no documented instances. In 2025, there were reports of more than 50 false killer whales hunting two humpback whales at the same time.

The false killer whale is known to host parasites: trematode Nasitrema in the sinuses, nematode Stenurus in the sinuses and lungs, an unidentified crassicaudine nematode in the sinuses, stomach nematodes Anisakis simplex and Anisakis typica, acanthocephalan worm Bolbosoma capitatum in the intestines, whale lice Syncyamus pseudorcae and Isocyamus delphinii, and the whale barnacle Xenobalanus globicipitis. Some strandings had whales with large Bolbosoma infestations, such as the 1976 and 1986 strandings in Florida.

== Population and distribution ==
The false killer whale appears to have a widespread presence in tropical and semitropical oceans. The species has been found in temperate waters, but these occurrences were possibly stray individuals, or associated with warm water events. It generally does not go beyond 50°N or below 50°S. It usually inhabits open ocean and deep-water areas, though it may frequent coastal areas near oceanic islands. Distinct populations inhabit the seas near the Hawaiian Islands and in the eastern North Pacific.

The false killer whale is thought to be common around the world, though no total estimate has been made. The population in the Eastern Pacific is probably in the low tens-of-thousands, and ~16,000 near China and Japan. The population around Hawaii has been declining.

== Human interaction ==
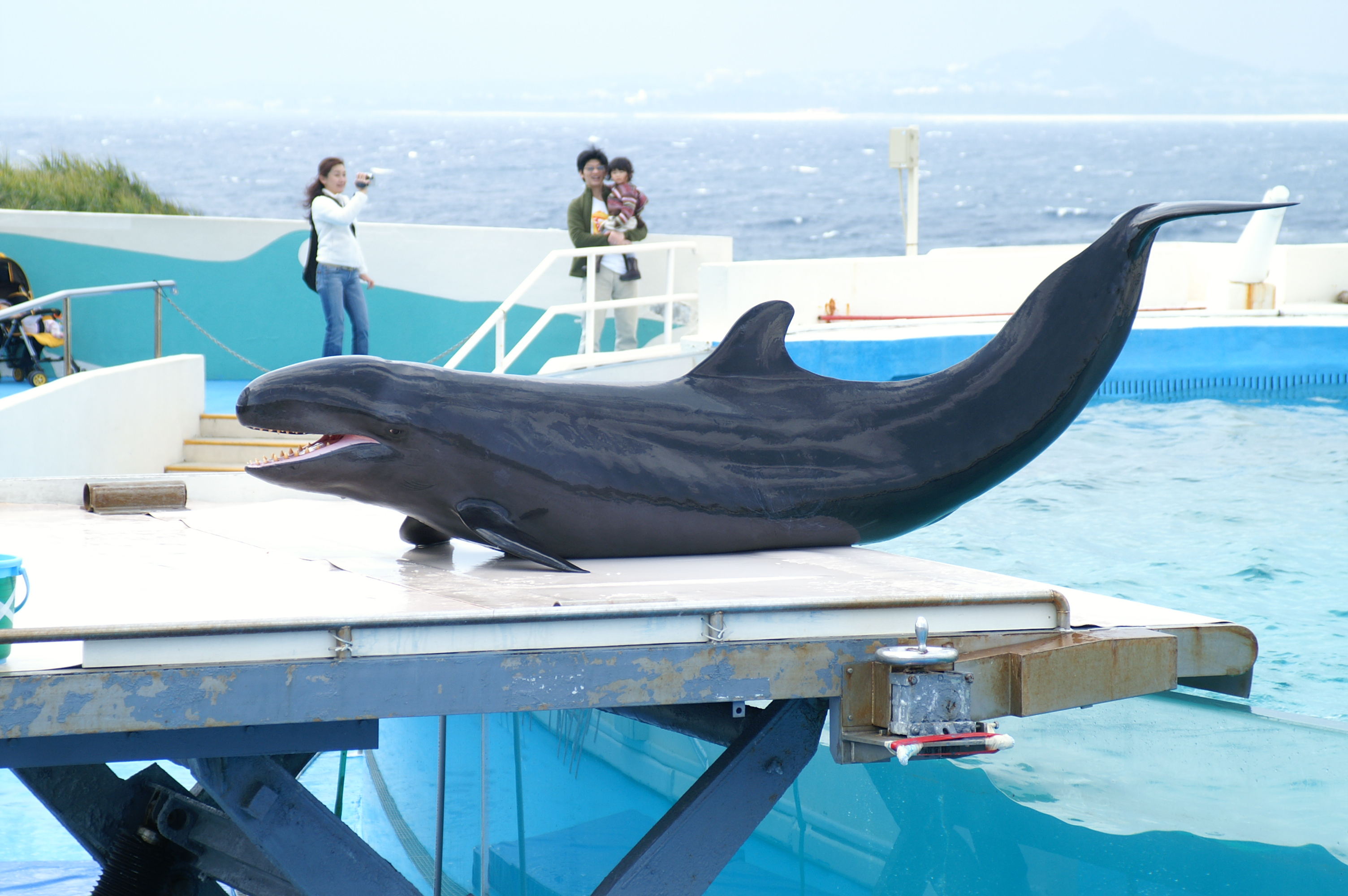
False killer whale at the Okinawa Churaumi Aquarium

The false killer whale is known to be much more adaptable in captivity than other dolphins, being easily trained and highly sociable with other species, and as such it has been kept in several public aquariums around the world, such as in Japan, the United States, the Netherlands, Hong Kong, and Australia. Individuals were mainly captured off California and Hawaii, and then in Japan and Taiwan after 1980. It has also been successfully bred in captivity. Chester, an orphaned calf that had been stranded near Tofino in 2014 and rescued by Vancouver Aquarium, probably died from a bacterial erysipelas infection in 2017 at the age of approximately three and a half.

The false killer has been known to approach and offer fish it has caught to humans diving or boating. It also takes fish off hooks, which sometimes leads to entanglement or swallowing the hook. Entanglement can cause drowning, loss of circulation to an appendage, or impede the animal's ability to hunt, and swallowing the hook can puncture the digestive tract or can become a blockage. In Hawaii, this is likely leading to the decline in local populations, reducing them by 75% from 1989 to 2009. The false killer is more susceptible to organochloride buildup than other dolphins, being higher up on the food chain, and stranded individuals around the world show higher levels than other dolphins. It has been known to ride the wakes of large boats, which could put it at risk of hitting the propeller.

In a few Japanese villages, the false killer is killed in harpooning hunts and drive hunts using sound to herd individuals together and cause a mass stranding or corral them into nets before being killed. A total of 24 false killer whale were hunted in Japan from 2010 to 2023.

== Beachings ==
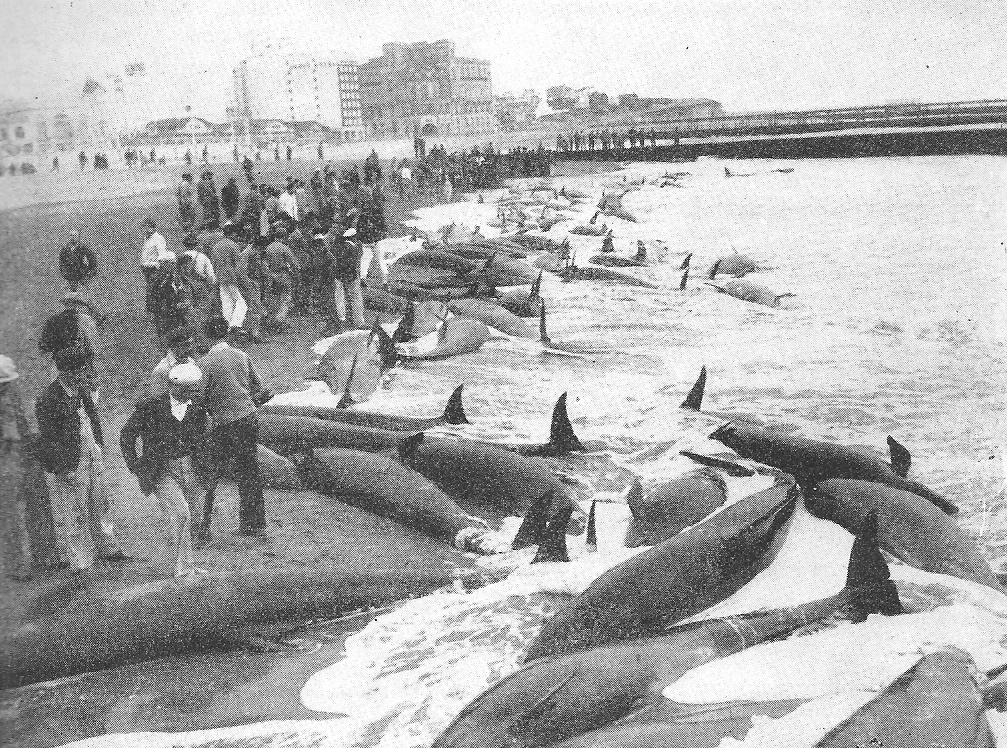
Mar del Plata, Argentina in 1946, the largest false killer whale stranding

The false killer whale regularly beaches itself, for reasons largely unknown, on coasts around the world, with the largest stranding consisting of 835 individuals on 9 October 1946 at Mar del Plata in Argentina. Unlike other dolphins, but similar to other globicephalines, the false killer usually mass strands in pods, leading to such high mortality rates. These can also occur in temperate waters outside its normal range, such as with the mass strandings in Britain in 1927, 1935, and 1936.

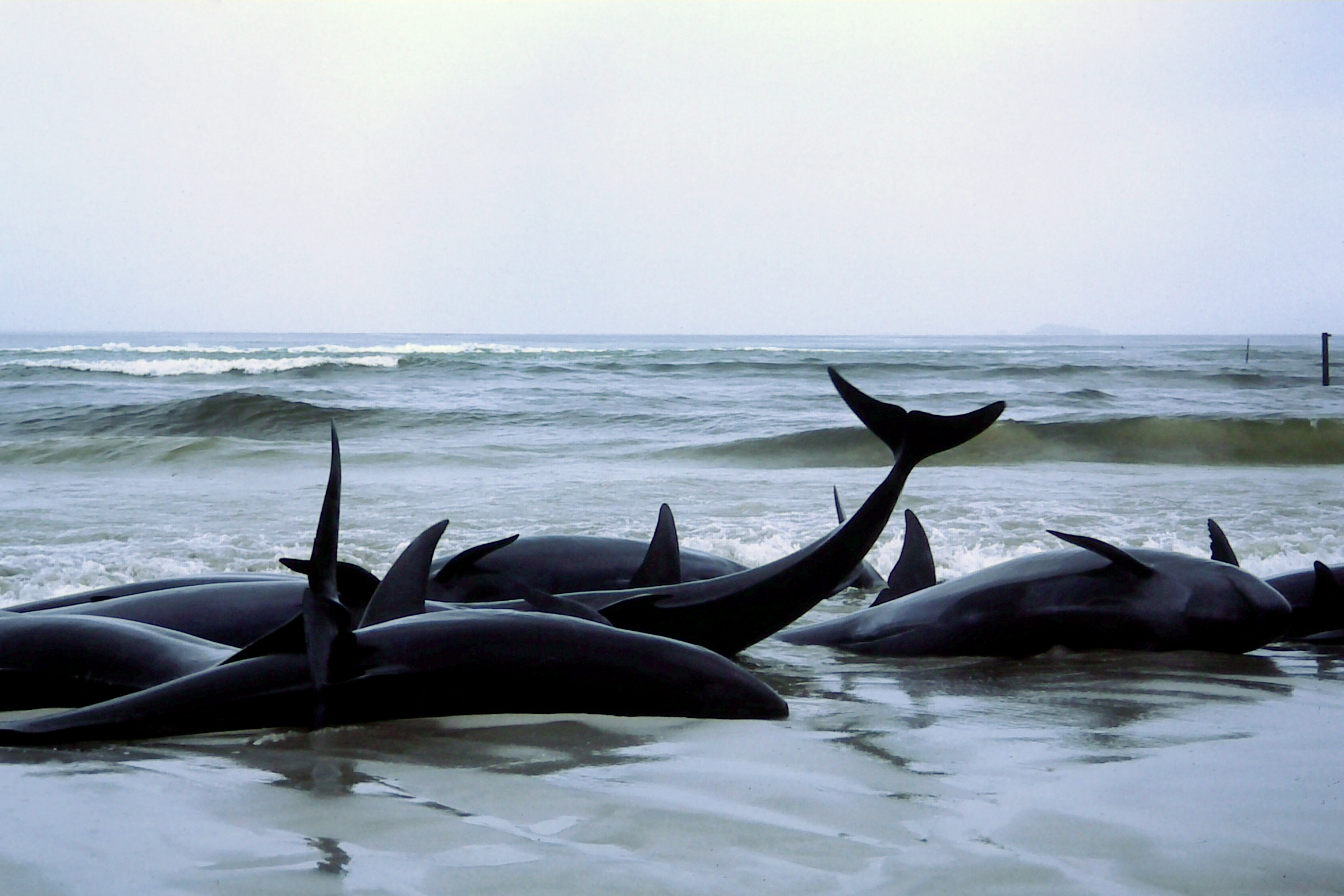
The Flinders Bay beaching in 1986

The 30 July 1986 mass stranding of 114 false killers in Flinders Bay, Western Australia was widely watched as volunteers and the newly created Department of Conservation and Land Management (CALM) saved 96 whales, and founded an informal network for whale strandings. The 2 June 2005 Geographe Bay stranding of 120 whales in Western Australia, the fourth in the bay, was caused by a storm preventing the animals from seeing the shoreline; this also caused a rescue effort of 1,500 volunteers by CALM.

Since 2005, there have been seven mass strandings of false killer whales in New Zealand involving more than one individual, the largest on 8 April 1943 on the Māhia Peninsula with 300 stranded, and 31 March 1978 in Manukau Harbour with 253 stranded.

Whale strandings are rare in southern Africa, but mass strandings in this area are typically associated with the false killer, with mass strandings averaging at 58 individuals. Hot-spots for mass stranding exist along the coast of the Western Cape in South Africa; the most recent on 30 May 2009 near the village of Kommetjie with 55 individuals.

On 14 January 2017, a pod of ~100 beached themselves in Everglades National Park, Florida, US; the remoteness of the area was detrimental to rescue efforts, causing the deaths of 81 whales. The other two strandings in Florida were in 1986 with three beached whales from a pod of 40 in Cedar Key, and 1980 with 28 stranded in Key West.

== Conservation ==
The false killer whale is covered by the Agreement on the Conservation of Small Cetaceans of the Baltic, North East Atlantic, Irish and North Seas (ASCOBANS), and the Agreement on the Conservation of Cetaceans in the Black Sea, Mediterranean Sea and Contiguous Atlantic Area (ACCOBAMS). The species is further included in the Memorandum of Understanding Concerning the Conservation of the Manatee and Small Cetaceans of Western Africa and Macaronesia (Western African Aquatic Mammals MoU) and the Memorandum of Understanding for the Conservation of Cetaceans and Their Habitats in the Pacific Islands Region (Pacific Cetaceans MoU).

No accurate global estimates for the false killer whale exist, so the species is listed as Near Threatened by the IUCN Redlist. In November 2012, the United States' National Oceanic and Atmospheric Administration recognized the Hawaiian population of false killers, comprising ~150 whales, as endangered.

== See also ==
- List of cetaceans
