= Halocercus pingi =

Scientific classification
- Kingdom: Animalia
- Phylum: Nematoda
- Class: Chromadorea
- Order: Rhabditida
- Family: Pseudaliidae
- Genus: Halocercus
- Species: H. pingi

Binomial name
- Halocercus pingi Wu, 1929

Species of nematode

Halocercus pingi is a species of metastrongyloid lungworm nematode that parasitizes the respiratory tract of cetaceans. It causes lethal pneumonia in young Indo-Pacific finless porpoise.

== Morphology ==
Halocerus pingi is a large, thread-like nematode with mostly smooth cuticles featuring fine annulations on anterior and posterior ends. It has 6 inconspicuous head papillae, a circular mouth, extremely short muscular esophagus, and two very long esophageal glands 5-7 times the esophagus length. Males possess a disc-like copulatory bursa with equal spicules. Females are viviparous.
