= Halocercus brasiliensis =

Scientific classification
- Kingdom: Animalia
- Phylum: Nematoda
- Class: Chromadorea
- Order: Rhabditida
- Family: Pseudaliidae
- Genus: Halocercus
- Species: H. brasiliensis

Binomial name
- Halocercus brasiliensis Lins de Almeida, 1933

Parasitic species of nematode

Halocercus brasiliensis is a species of metastrongyloid nematode from the family Pseudaliidae that primarily infect the respiratory system of Guiana dolphin.

== Morphology ==
Halocercus brasiliensis is a yellowish-white, long, relatively thick bodies nematode with attenuated extremities. The cuticle has transverse striations, more pronounced at the anterior and posterior ends. There is no clear difference in length between male and female.

Male worms feature a simple esophagus, a reduced membranous bursa without distinct lobules, subequal spicules with proximal inflation and bifid distal end, and a well-chitinized gubernaculum.

Female worms are ovoviviparous. They feature a simple esophagus, with a vulva near the anus, a short vagina, and a didelphic uterus. Eggs in utero contain developed larvae.

== Pathology ==
Infections are associated with pulmonary lesions, including calcified nodules, emphysema, lung congestion, and edema.
