= Halocercus =

Scientific classification
- Kingdom: Animalia
- Phylum: Nematoda
- Class: Chromadorea
- Order: Rhabditida
- Family: Pseudaliidae
- Genus: Halocercus; Baylis & Daubney, 1925

Genus of roundworms

Halocercus Baylis & Daubney, 1925 is a genus of metastrongyloid lungworms (family Pseudaliidae, subfamily Halocercinae) that parasitize the respiratory tract of cetaceans. Halocercus is found worldwide. Halocercus can be differentiated from other genus of the subfamily Halocercinae by their males having an unlobed bursa. The females are ovoviviparous.

Species:

- Halocercus brasiliensis Almeida, 1933
- Halocercus cryptocephalus (Delyamure, 1942) Pool, Fernández, Chandradeva, Raga & Aznar, 2020
- Halocercus dalli Yamaguti, 1951
- Halocercus delphini Baylis & Daubney, 1925
- Halocercus hyperoodoni (Gubanov, 1952)
- Halocercus invaginatus (Quekett, 1841) Dougherty, 1943
- Halocercus kirbyi Dougherty, 1944
- Halocercus kleinenbergi Delamure, 1951
- Halocercus lagenorhynchi Baylis & Daubney, 1925
- Halocercus monoceris Webster, Neufeld & MacNeil, 1973
- Halocercus pingi Wu, 1929
- Halocercus sunameri Yamaguti, 1951
- Halocercus taurica Delyamure, 1942
