= Costa Rica Thermal Dome =

Thermal dome in Costa Rica

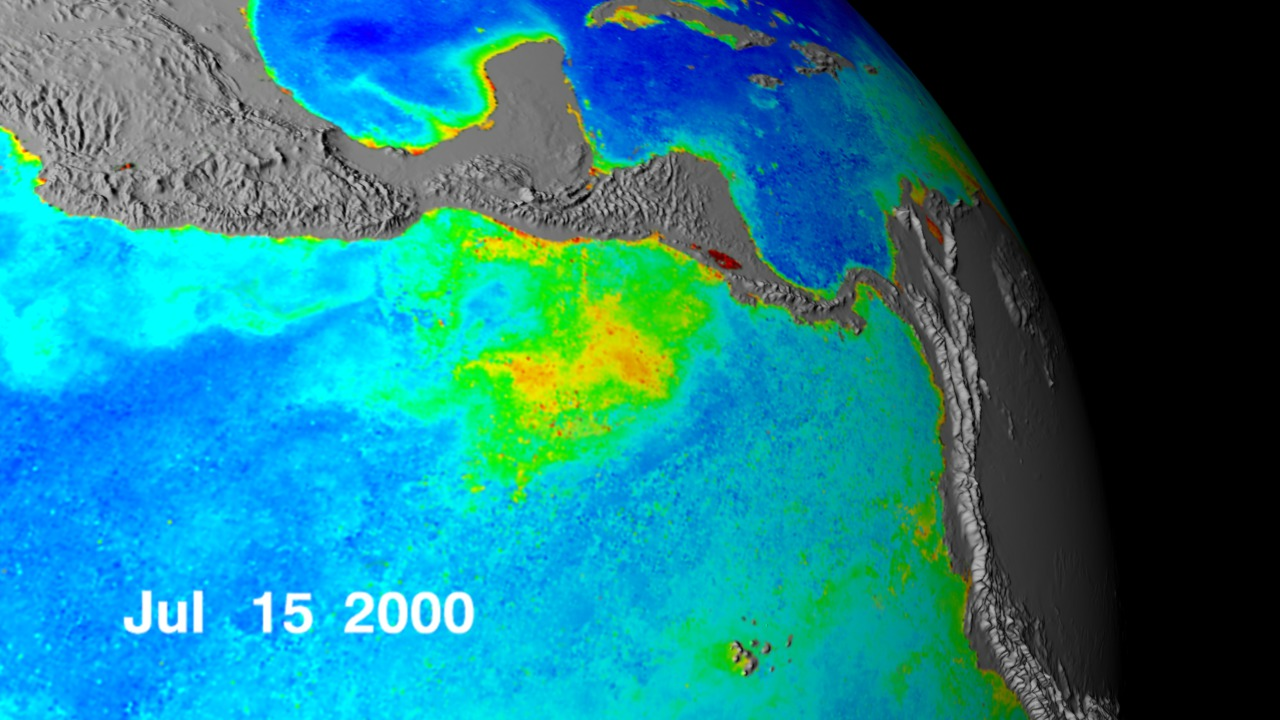
A Satellite image of the Costa Rica Dome. Location: off the coast of Costa Rica and Nicaragua.

The Costa Rica Thermal Dome (CRTD; also called the Costa Rica Dome), is an oceanographic feature and marine biodiversity hotspot that varies in size from 300 to 1,000 km in diameter. The dome is located off the western coast of Central America in the Tropical Eastern Pacific. Through the interaction of wind and ocean currents, deeper waters are drawn towards the surface in a dome-like shape at this location. These waters displace the warmer, nutrient-poor waters with colder, nutrient-richer waters. An investigation by UNESCO'S World Heritage Site and International Union for Conservation of nature (IUCN) in 2016 considered it eligible to become a World Heritage Site in the near future.

The average position of the center of the Costa Rica Dome is located at latitude 9°N, longitude 90°W, which is off the coast of Costa Rica. The dome is positioned above the Cocos underwater tectonic valley and provides a subaquatic cyclonic current that moves in sync with the above air flows. The Costa Rica Thermal Dome is full of biodiversity and many forms of marine life. The nutrient hotspot consists of all types of animals ranging from zoo-plankton to the blue whale. The location is also within one of the largest tuna catchment areas in the world The Costa Rica Dome is also positioned on the major seaway to the Panama Canal for transportation.

The dome and its marine life provide economic benefits for countries such as Panama and Costa Rica. The ecological significance of the dome is important for many Costa Ricans. At the 12th conference of parties at the Convention on Biological Diversity (CBD) in South Korea, the dome was considered a marine zone of biological or ecological importance.

== Geology and geography ==
The Costa Rica Dome operates beyond national jurisdiction and its diameter and position change yearly and in a characteristic annual cycle. The dome's upwelling consists of vertical changes, water from oceanic depths rising towards the surface. Strong winds push warm water away from the coast. These warm waters then collide and are substituted by cold nutrient-rich waters from the depths. The upwelling within the dome is caused by circulation of the Costa Rican current, northeastern Equatorial Counter Current and the Northwestern Equatorial Current combining with the Papagayo Jet stream that crosses over the Lake of Nicaragua and the northern plains of Costa Rica.

The Costa Rica Dome is similar to other thermocline domes as it has an east–west thermocline ridge with a seasonal evolution affected by large scale wind patterns. The Costa Rica Dome has a unique property as it is formed by a coastal wind jet. The cycle of the dome can be explained as four wind forcing stages: coastal shoaling of the thermocline off the Gulf of Papagayo in February–April, separation from the coast during May–June, countercurrent thermocline ridging during July–November and deepening during December–January.

The axis of the Costa Rica Dome rotates far west of the Isla del Coco. The inter-tropical convergence lies in the middle of the dome and is seen close to the shores of Costa Rica. Distribution of nutrients and oxygen within the Costa Rica Dome is determined primarily through the localised upwelling of the nutrient-rich, oxygen-poor water from 65m and deeper and the substantial mixing of oxygen-rich and low nutrient content levels. The huge marine current that generates the displacement of deep, cold and nutrient water makes the dome one of the richest places on the planet. The oceanic floor of the dome is abundant with methane clathrate, known as 'fire ice'.

== Ecology ==
=== Marine Life ===
The Costa Rica dome is a biodiversity hotspot for marine life. The presence of a seasonally predictable strong and shallow thermocline associated with cyclonic circulation and upwelling make the Costa Rica Dome a distinct biological habitat, with zoo-plankton and phytoplankton biomass significantly higher than in the tropical waters surrounding it. The algae are strengthened because of the enormous amount of cold water, combined with sunlight. Within the dome there is the highest concentration of chlorophyll in the world, with approximately 60 milligrams per cubic centimetre of sea water. This feeds zoo-plankton consisting of larvae and larger animals such as sea sponges, worms, echinoderms, mollusks, crustaceans, and other arthropods. Another important aspect of the Costa Rica Dome is its of dense patches of krill at various depths.

The dome is also a habitat to sharks, dolphins, eels, tuna, billfish, and sea turtles: olive ridley sea turtles and leatherback sea turtle, stingrays, octopuses, colonies of seabirds and blue whales and killer whales.

The dome is a unique year-round habitat for blue whale. Of the nine distinct blue whale populations around the world, this area's is the largest with an estimated 3,000 whales. The dome provides an area for mating, feeding, breeding, calving and raising calves. With satellite tracking, the Costa Rica Dome was found to be a calving breeding area for North Pacific blue whales as-well as a major migration corridor for the whales.

Leatherback sea turtle are the widest-ranging marine turtle species and are critically endangered. The Costa Rica Dome may be a significant migratory path for the endangered turtles nesting in Costa Rica. In 2008, a large multi-year satellite data tracking set for the leatherback sea turtle was analysed. The results showed that the migration path of these turtles took them through the southern edge of the Costa Rica Dome and the Costa Rica Coastal Current, indicating that the dome is part of the migration corridor for the endangered leatherback turtle.

An ecological feature of the dome is the "tune-dolphin-seabird assemblage" which can be characterised as a feeding relationship between yellowfin tuna, spotted and spinner dolphins and large number of seabird species. The flock of seabirds feed on the prey at the surface made possible by the subsurface tuna and dolphin predators. The tuna, because of their near-surface occurrence, large size and visibility due to the relationship with the dolphins and seabirds, this area forms one of the world's largest yellowfin tuna fisheries.

== History ==
The Costa Rica Thermal Done was detected off the Central American country in 1948, through the use of bathythermographs, thermometers that measure and graphically represent the temperature of the seawater at different depths, used on ships that traveled from California to Panama. The dome was found by Townsend Cromwell, and he also named it.

== Human use ==
=== Ecotourism ===
Due to the Costa Rica Thermal Dome, several species that benefit from its habitat move close to the coasts and help sustain economic activities for the close countries. The countries from within this region contribute greatly to the fishing industry in Central America, with it being estimated these countries generated $750 million in 2009 for the industry. Another example of tourism is sea turtle nesting within this region. This activity helped generate $2,113,176 for the tour operators and related businesses close to the Las Baulas Marine National Park in 2004.

The Costa Rica Dome is estimated to bring in more than $20 million a year for at least 10 fishing communities. Additionally, sport fishing benefits greatly from the domes biodiversity. In Costa Rica sport fishing generated close to $599 million in 2008 which is 2.13% of GDP for that year. Secondly, in Panama it was estimated to generate $170.4 million in 2013.

Additionally, in September 2014, the first day of the annual Festival of Whales and Dolphins, which is dedicated to whale watching in southeast Costa Rica, earned $40,000.

=== Conservation ===
The Costa Rica Dome was declared a marine zone of ecological or biological importance at the "12th conference of the Parties of the Convention on Biological Diversity (CBD)". The promotion of maritime conservation and highlighting the migration and feeding of species such as the blue whale, Leatherback sea turtle and common dolphin. Additionally, the Ministry of Environment and Energy of Costa Rica prepared a zoning decree at the same time that would help control the fishing of tuna (oceanic fish). In January 2015 a consensus recommendation was agreed by the Ad-Hoc Working Group at the United Nations. This historic decision was one towards the development of an international legally binding instrument on conservation and sustainable use of marine biodiversity in areas beyond national jurisdiction.

There have been several conservation efforts into the Costa Rica Dome. Mission Blue, a group consisting of more than 200 respected ocean conservation groups and like-minded organisations, have led extensive research into the Costa Rica Thermal Dome. Similarly, since 2012 the Marviva foundation has promoted the Costa Rica Thermal Dome Initiative in order to ensure sustainability. In order to study the cold upwellings in the Dome they implemented two methods. A zooplankton net was dropped to 80 meters and pulled up samples in multiple locations and a second collection process which involved a niskin bottle. This device can be deployed at any length to capture a sample from that specific part of the ocean. This sample is water collected from a specific water level.

The Costa Rica Dome operates in areas beyond natural jurisdiction, which are areas that lie further than 200 nautical miles from shore and beyond a countries Exclusive Economic Zone. The United Nations Convention on the Law of the Sea provides legal framework that helps regulate areas beyond natural jurisdiction. However, access to majority of the ocean is now possible because of human technological advancements, causing Areas beyond natural jurisdiction are constantly exploited for their resources.

==== Global Ocean Biodiversity Initiative ====
GOBI consists of an international partnership of institutions committed to conserving biological diversity within the marine environment. GOBI provides expertise, data and knowledge in order to support the identification on ecological and biological significant marine areas by the Convention on Biological Diversity. GOBI's work intends to catalogue all available information on the physical and biological characteristics of the Costa Rica Dome. The approach to this work is:

- Publication of a spatial and temporal species distribution atlas for the Costa Rica Thermal Dome. Visualisations of the oceanographic features and ecological attributes, value of the resource and the economic and biological links to Central America are to be included within the contents.
- Raised awareness of the value and relevance of biodiversity sustained by the CRTD and the linkages to human wellbeing and the conservation of areas beyond natural jurisdiction applied through an extensive public outreach program as-well as a media campaign.
- Creation of a multisectoral recommendation for a potential macro-zonation plan for the CRTD, leading to the development of a potential governance model for the CRTD that lies in international waters
- Promotion of agreed recommendations and governance model amongst decision makers within Central America.
