= Stenurus =

Scientific classification
- Kingdom: Animalia
- Phylum: Nematoda
- Class: Chromadorea
- Order: Rhabditida
- Family: Pseudaliidae
- Subfamily: Stenurinae
- Genus: Stenurus; Dujardin, 1845

Genus of roundworms

Stenurus is a genus of nematode that infects the respiratory system and sinuses of cetaceans, which includes whales, dolphins, and porpoises. Up to 1700 worms may be found in a single host.

Males of the genus Stenurus are characterized by a conspicuous bursa with trunk-like bursal rays, a well-developed dorsal rays, and spicules bearing a deep blade.

== Species ==
There are 9 species:

- Stenurus arctomarinus Delyamure & Kleinenberg, 1958
- Stenurus auditivus Hsu & Hoeppli, 1933
- Stenurus australis Sarmiento & Tantalean, 1991
- Stenurus globicephalae Baylis & Daubney, 1925
- Stenurus minor (Kuhn, 1829) Baylis & Daubney, 1925
- Stenurus nanjingensis Tao, 1983
- Stenurus ovatus (von Linstow, 1910) Baylis & Daubney, 1925
- Stenurus truei Machida, 1974
- Stenurus yamagutii Kuramochi, Araki & Machida, 1990

== Formerly accepted species ==
- Stenurus alatus Leuckart, 1848) Yorke & Maplestone, 1926 accepted as Pharurus alatus (Leuckart, 1848) Stiles & Hassall, 1905 (Superseded combination)
- Stenurus arcticus (Cobb, 1888) Baylis & Daubney, 1925 accepted as Pharurus pallasii (Van Beneden, 1870) Arnold & Gaskin, 1975 (Synonym)
- Stenurus inflexus (Rudolphi, 1808) Dujardin, 1845 accepted as Pseudalius inflexus (Rudolphi, 1808) Schneider, 1866 (Superseded combination)
- Stenurus pallasii (van Beneden, 1870) accepted as Pharurus pallasii (Van Beneden, 1870) Arnold & Gaskin, 1975 (Superseded combination)
- Stenurus phocoenae Dougherty, 1943 accepted as Stenurus minor (Kuhn, 1829) Baylis & Daubney, 1925 (Synonym)
- Stenurus vagans (Eschricht, 1841) Dougherty, 1943 accepted as Stenurus minor (Kuhn, 1829) Baylis & Daubney, 1925 (Synonym)
