= Maternal transfer in aquatic mammals =

Biological Phenomenon

In aquatic mammals, maternal transfer is the movement of contaminants from mother to offspring, typically of lipophilic contaminants while in utero or through the mother's milk. This has become important with the increase in usage of persistent organic pollutants (POPs). POPs biomagnify due to their lipophilic nature and become accumulated in the lipid tissues of aquatic mammals. These lipids are used as energy for the mother during the development of offspring, which releases the POPs into the circulatory fluid. This leads to a transfer of the toxicants into the developing embryos during gestation as well as into milk that an aquatic mammal produces during lactation.

== History and background ==
Marine mammals are exposed to a variety of chemicals throughout their life, mostly through their diet. Once the chemicals are accumulated in the body tissues of the mammals, a portion of these chemicals in the female mammals are transferred to their offspring during gestation and lactation.

The degree of maternal-fetal transfer of chemical pollutants is affected by chemical and physical properties of those compounds. Lipophilicity, protein binding, and active transport mechanisms all influence the absorption and distribution of such chemicals in maternal tissues. Lipophilic chemicals, such as many POPs, can be transferred through the fatty portion of milk, while hydrophilic components can be transferred along with the liquid portion of the milk. The placenta provides a barrier to some contaminants, but is partially permeable to others, including many organics and certain heavy metals such as lead, mercury and cadmium, particularly when combined with organic molecules.

== Mechanisms of Maternal Transfer ==
=== Lactation ===
The transfer of contaminants from mother to pup through lactation is most likely the largest mass transfer of contaminants, greater than that of in-utero transfers. When the mother begins lactation, blubber lipids are converted into milk lipids to feed her offspring. During this process, toxicants that were stored in blubber lipids are moved into the milk and subsequently are transferred to the nursing pup.

The transfer of toxicants through lactation is driven by the log Kow of the toxicants. Chemical compounds with a high affinity for lipids (a higher log Kow) will more readily be transferred through lactation due to the high lipid content of milk. The transfer of toxicants from blubber to milk is not fully understood, and selective transfer of contaminants has been observed.

Mass balance of toxicants is difficult during lactation due to milk lipids originating from blubber lipids as well as being synthesized locally in mammary tissue. The change in toxicant solubility between blubber and circulatory fluid as well as the breakdown and resynthesis of blubber lipids and circulatory lipids also contributes to the difficulties of mass balance of toxicants between blubber, circulatory, and milk lipids.

However, even with difficulties of mass balancing, it has generally been observed in grey seals and harbor porpoises that residues in pup blubber lipids are generally similar or slightly higher than in maternal milk lipids, and are approximately half of the residues in maternal blubber lipids.

=== Placental Transfer ===
The transfer of POPs from mother to fetus via the placenta is less than that of lactation but can still cause adverse effects. Fatty acids from the mother's plasma are transported either through diffusion or active transport through the placenta to be used in important processes such as brain development. Sources of fatty acids are mainly derived from blubber in seals, porpoises, and whales.

Lipophilic chemicals such as PCBs previously stored within the mother's fatty tissue can be transferred to the fetus via the circulatory fluid. Some lipophilic chemicals can be metabolized by the fetus using mostly CYP enzymes, but others are quickly incorporated into developing fetal adipose tissue. The storage and release of these chemicals within the fetus can lead to endocrine disruption, immunosuppression, thyroid disruption, and neurotoxicity in seals and orcas.

== Implications ==
=== Offspring Vulnerability ===
In mammals, maternal factors can be transferred via the placenta, in the colostrum, and in normal milk during lactation. Marine mammal offspring are especially vulnerable during the time when their own immune systems have not yet matured. When females provide milk to their young, they can have a dramatic impact on offspring fitness during ontogeny, as well as when the offspring matures into an adult. Female marine mammals pass on most of their POP burden to their first-born offspring, while the calf is in utero and afterwards during lactation. The large amount of POPs transferred to the offspring as well as the fast rate of transfer, can sometimes prove fatal.

=== Male vs. Female ===
The POP burden carried by male and female marine mammals tends to increase with time until they reach the age of sexual maturity. After that point, the burden in males continues to grow, as they continue to absorb POPs from their food. However, with female marine mammals, the POP burden carried decreases after birth but can then increase until the next reproductive cycle.
