= Pseudaliidae =

Scientific classification
- Kingdom: Animalia
- Phylum: Nematoda
- Class: Chromadorea
- Order: Rhabditida
- Superfamily: Metastrongyloidea
- Family: Pseudaliidae; Railliet & Henry, 1909

Family of nematodes

Pseudaliidae is a family of nematodes belonging to the order Strongylida.

Genera:

- Halocercus Baylis & Daubney, 1925
- Pharurus Leuckart, 1848
- Pseudalius Dujardin, 1845
- Skrjabinalius Delyamure, 1942
- Stenuroides Gerichter, 1951
- Stenurus Dujardin, 1845
- Torynurus Baylis & Daubney, 1925
