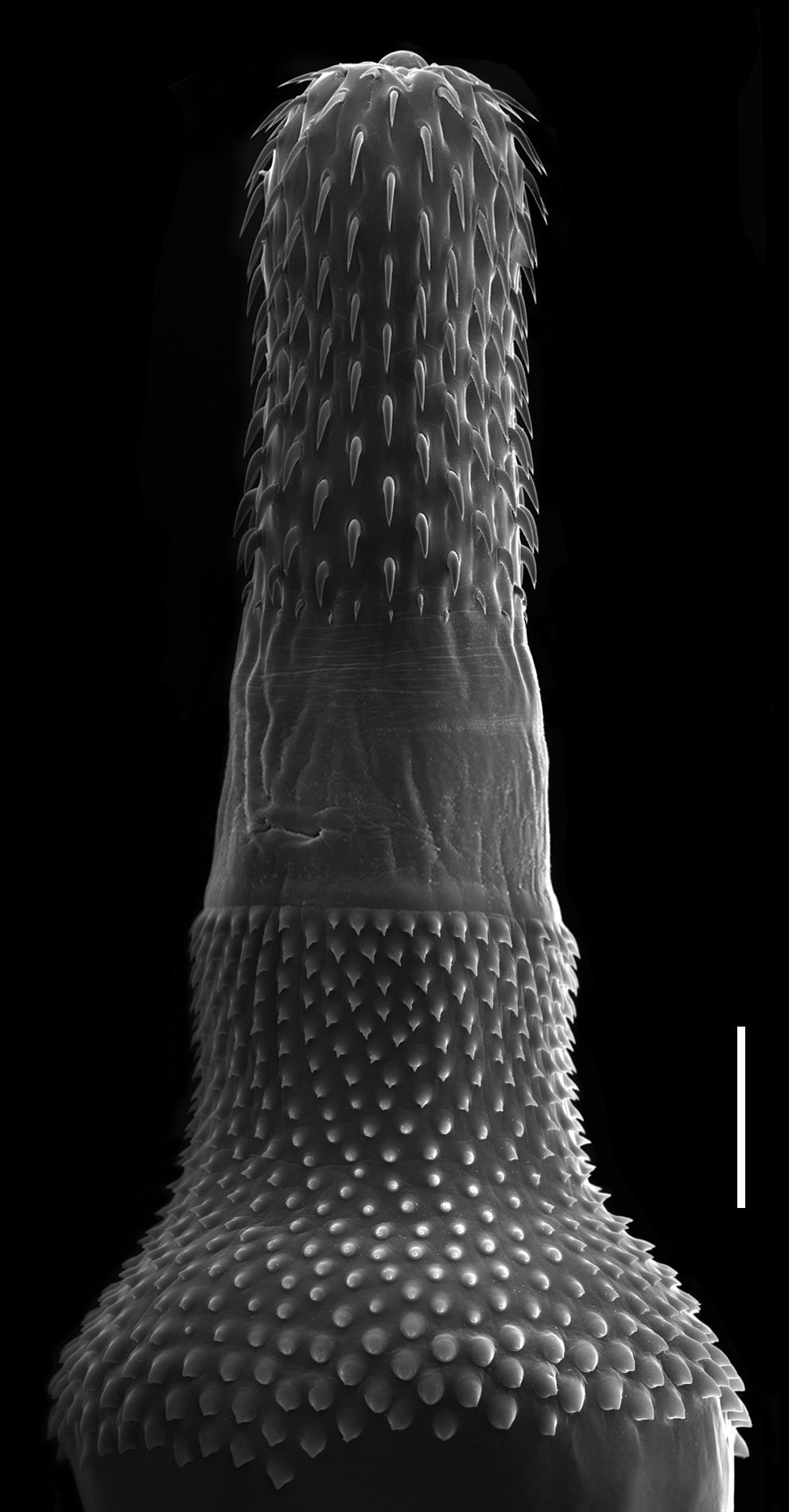
- Proboscis, neck and trunk spines of a juvenile Bolbosoma turbinella. Bars is 200um.

Scientific classification
- Kingdom: Animalia
- Phylum: Acanthocephala
- Class: Palaeacanthocephala
- Order: Polymorphida
- Family: Polymorphidae
- Genus: Bolbosoma; Porta, 1908

Type species
- Bolbosoma

= Bolbosoma =

Genus of parasitic worms

Bolbosoma is a genus in Acanthocephala (thorny-headed worms, also known as spiny-headed worms).

== Taxonomy ==
The genus was described by Porta in 1908. Phylogenetic analysis has been published on Bolbosoma species.

== Description ==
Bolbosoma species consist of a proboscis covered in hooks and a long trunk.

== Species ==
The genus Bolbosoma contains twelve species.

- Bolbosoma australis Skrjabin, 1972
- Bolbosoma balaenae (Gmelin, 1790)

Found in the fin whale (Balaenoptera physalus).

- Bolbosoma brevicolle (Malm, 1867)
- Bolbosoma caenoforme Heitz, 1920
- Bolbosoma capitatum (von Linstow, 1880)
- Bolbosoma hamiltoni Baylis, 1929
- Bolbosoma heteracanthe (Heitz, 1917)
- Bolbosoma nipponicum Yamaguti, 1939
- Bolbosoma scomberomori Wang, 1980
- Bolbosoma tuberculata Skrjabin, 1970
- Bolbosoma turbinella (Diesing, 1851)

Found in the South American fur seal, (Arctocephalus australis).

- Bolbosoma vasculosum (Rudolphi, 1819)

== Distribution ==
The distribution of Bolbosoma is determined by that of its hosts. The genus has cosmopolitan distribution.

== Hosts ==
Life cycle of Acanthocephala. (Note: There are no known aberrant human infections for Bolbosoma species.)

The life cycle of an acanthocephalan consists of three stages beginning when an infective acanthor (development of an egg) is released from the intestines of the definitive host and then ingested by an arthropod, the intermediate host. Although the intermediate hosts of Bolbosoma are arthropods. When the acanthor molts, the second stage called the acanthella begins. This stage involves penetrating the wall of the mesenteron or the intestine of the intermediate host and growing. The final stage is the infective cystacanth which is the larval or juvenile state of an Acanthocephalan, differing from the adult only in size and stage of sexual development. The cystacanths within the intermediate hosts are consumed by the definitive host, usually attaching to the walls of the intestines, and as adults they reproduce sexually in the intestines. The acanthor is passed in the feces of the definitive host and the cycle repeats. There may be paratenic hosts (hosts where parasites infest but do not undergo larval development or sexual reproduction) for Bolbosoma.

Bolbosoma parasitizes animals. There are reported cases of Bolbosoma infesting humans.

Hosts for Bolbosoma species

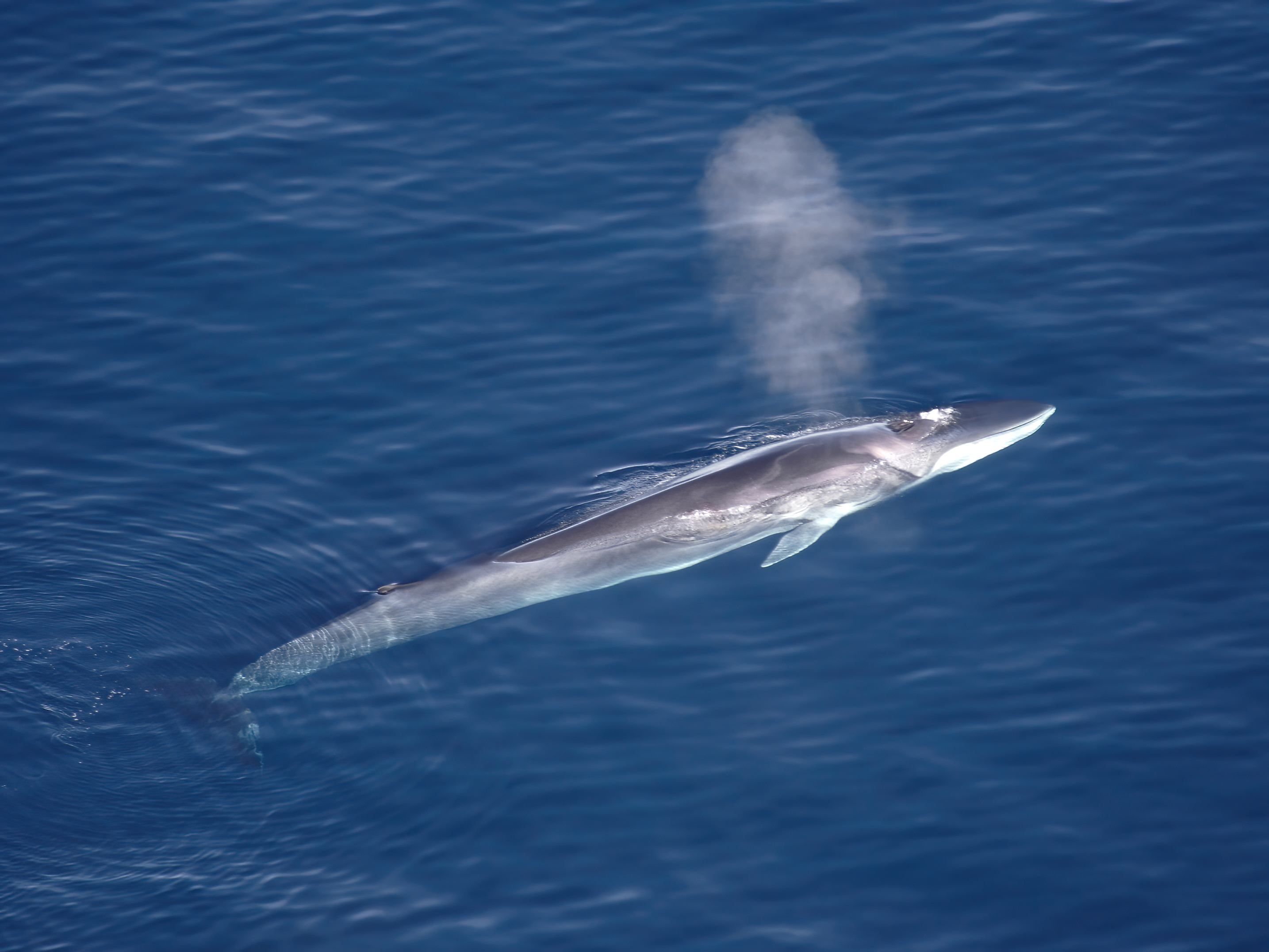
The fin whale is a host for B. balaenae.

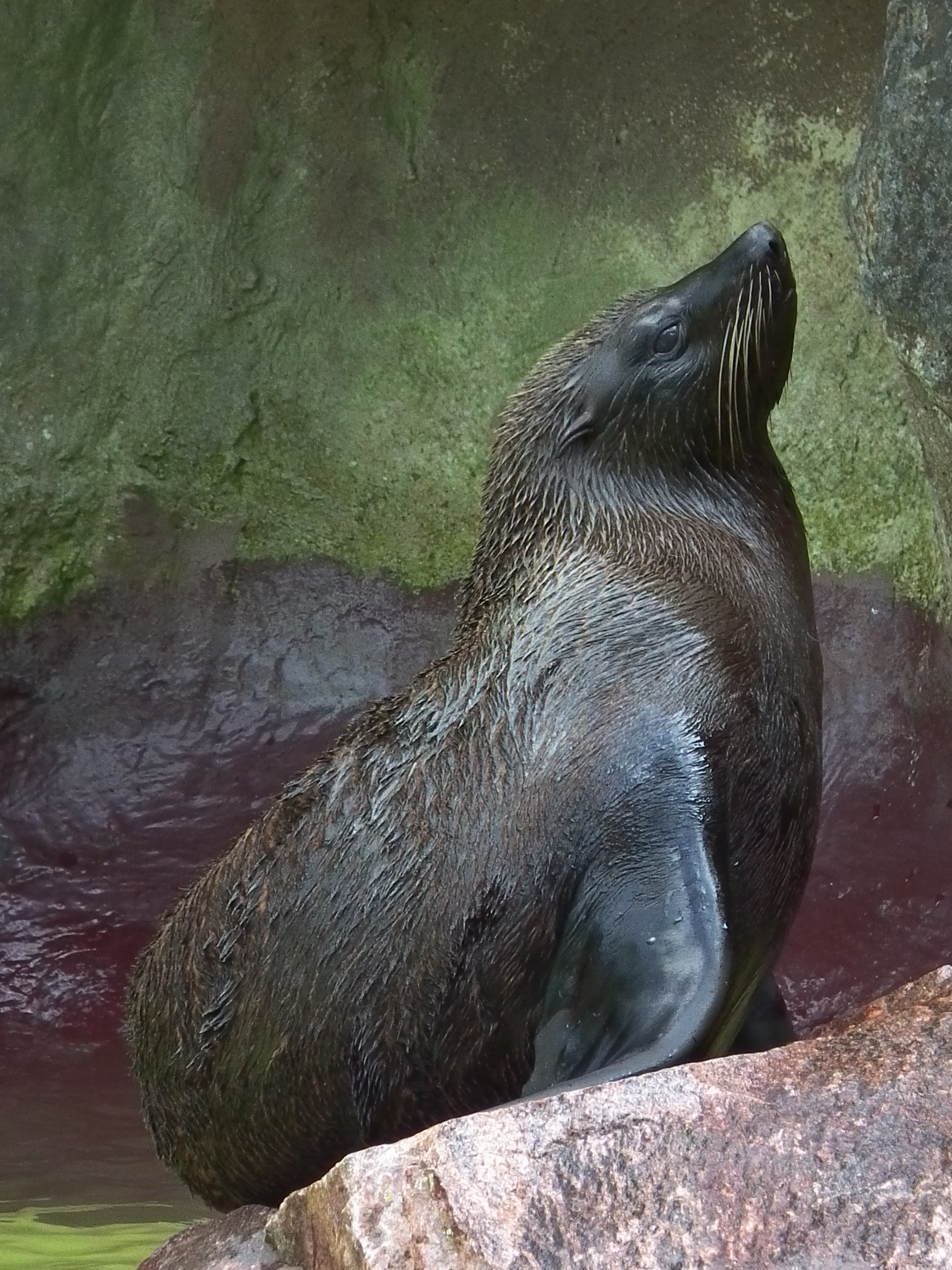
The South American fur seal is a host for B. turbinella.
