= Right whale (disambiguation) =

Right whale may refer to:

Baleen whale taxa:

- the taxonomic family Balaenidae which consists of two genera Eubalaena and the Balaena (bowhead whale)
- the genus Eubalaena or any of the three species currently recognized in that genus:
  - North Atlantic right whale (E. glacialis)
  - North Pacific right whale (E. japonica)
  - Southern right whale (E. australis)
- Pygmy right whale (Caperea marginata) currently classified in its own family Neobalaenidae

Other:

- Right Whale Bay, South Georgia
- Right whale dolphin - two species of dolphins in the genus Lissodelphis
  - Northern right whale dolphin
  - Southern right whale dolphin
