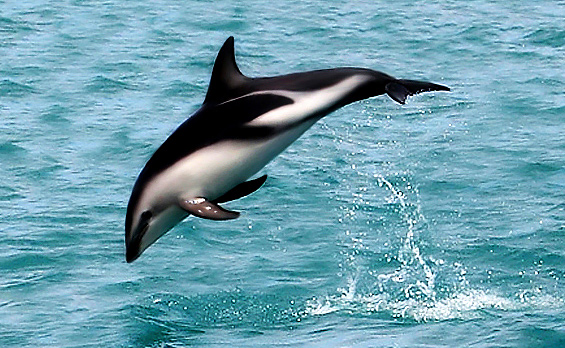

Conservation status
- Least Concern (IUCN 3.1)
- CITES Appendix II

Scientific classification
- Kingdom: Animalia
- Phylum: Chordata
- Class: Mammalia
- Order: Artiodactyla
- Infraorder: Cetacea
- Family: Delphinidae
- Genus: Aethalodelphis
- Species: A. obscurus

Binomial name
- Aethalodelphis obscurus (J.E. Gray, 1828)

Subspecies
- A. o. fitzroyi Waterhouse, 1838; A. o. obscurus Gray, 1868; A. o. posidonia Philippi, 1893
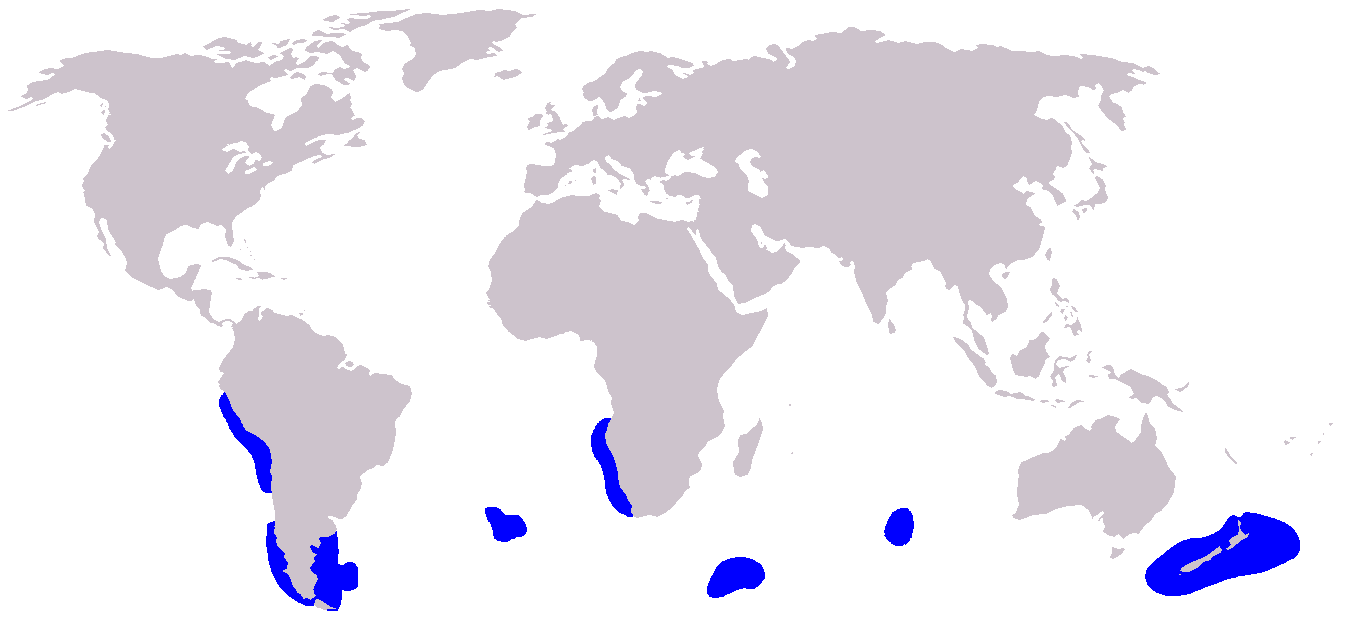
- Range of the dusky dolphin

Synonyms
- Lagenorhynchus fitzroyi Waterhouse, 1838; Delphinus fitzroyi Waterhouse, 1838; Delphinus breviceps Wiegmann, 1840; Electra breviceps Jacquinot and Pucheran, 1853; Lagenorhynchus breviceps Jacquinot and Pucheran, 1853; Lagenorhynchus thicolea breviceps Jacquinot and Pucheran, 1853; Lagenorhynchus similis Gray, 1868; Clymenia similis Gray, 1868; Prodelphinus petersii Reinhardt, 1889; Lissodelphis panope Canto, 1896; Tursio panope Canto, 1896

= Dusky dolphin =

Species of marine mammal

The dusky dolphin (Aethalodelphis obscurus) is a small oceanic dolphin found in coastal waters of the Southern Hemisphere. It is most closely related to the Pacific white-sided dolphin. The dolphin's range is patchy, major populations occurring around South America, southwestern Africa, New Zealand, and several oceanic islands, with some sightings around southern Australia. It has a somewhat stocky body with a short beak and a curved dorsal fin and flippers. Like its closest relative, the dusky dolphin has a multi-coloured pigmentation of black, grey, and white.

The species prefers cool currents and inshore waters. It lives in a fission–fusion society where groups change size based on social and environmental conditions. The dolphin feeds on several fish and squid species and has flexible hunting tactics, including daytime bait ball herding and nightime feeding in layers of scattered organisms. Mating is promiscuous, and several males will chase after a single female, the fittest being able to catch her and reproduce. Females raise their young in nursery groups. The dusky dolphin is known for its acrobatics, displaying leaping behaviours which vary in complexity and may or may not create splashes.

The dusky dolphin is classified as Least Concern by the IUCN Red List as many populations appear to be healthy and stable. It has been caught in gill nets and killed to be used as bait. It is a popular tourist attraction and the object of whale watching tours. Both vessels and mussel farms can interfere with the dolphin's activities.

== Taxonomy ==
The dusky dolphin was described as Delphinus obscurus by John Edward Gray in 1828 based on stuffed skins with skulls shipped from the Cape of Good Hope to the British Museum in 1827. Gray later wrote that a similar dolphin was described as Delphinus superciliosus by French surgeons and naturalists René Lesson and Prosper Garnot in 1826 based on a specimen near Tasmania. Lesson and Garnot did not keep the specimen for their description but only an illustration of it, and later taxonomists did not consider this significant enough for a new species. Meanwhile, Charles Darwin described a "Delphinus fitzroyi" from a specimen harpooned off Argentina in 1838, which was later identified as this species, and thus become a junior synonym. The dusky dolphin was placed in the genus Lagenorhynchus by the American biologist Frederick W. True in 1889. Lagenorhynchus consists of the Greek lagenos (bottle/flask) and rhynchos (beak/snout); obscurus is Latin for "dark".

The genus Lagenorhynchus included the dusky dolphin, Pacific white-sided dolphin, Atlantic white-sided dolphin, white-beaked dolphin, hourglass dolphin, and Peale's dolphin, though genetic evidence indicates that this grouping is not a natural (monophyletic) taxon. A 2019 study proposed moving four species (the dusky dolphin, Pacific white-sided dolphin, hourglass dolphin, and Peale's dolphin) to the resurrected genus Sagmatias. A 2025 phylogenomic study found that Sagmatias as defined by the 2019 study is also not monophyletic and instead suggested that the dusky and Pacific white-sided dolphin be classified under a new genus, Aethalodelphis, which is Greek for "sooty or dusky dolphin". This is considered valid by the Society for Marine Mammalogy (SMM) as of 2025.

The dusky dolphin is most closely related to the Pacific white-sided dolphin, and these two sister species diverged around two million years ago. Dusky dolphin populations may have originated somewhere in the South Pacific or southern Indian Ocean and dispersed to their current range following the spread of favoured food like anchovies. Possible hybrids of dusky dolphins with other species have been suggested based on observations and photographic evidence, including with a common dolphin and a southern right whale dolphin.

The following cladogram is based on a phylogenomic study by Galatius and colleagues (2025):

- Lissodelphininae
  - - Northern right whale dolphin
    - Southern right whale dolphin
  - - - Pacific white-sided dolphin
      - Dusky dolphin
    - - - Heaviside's dolphin
        - - Peale's dolphin
          - Hourglass dolphin
      - - Hector's dolphin
        - - Commerson's dolphin
          - Chilean dolphin

=== Subspecies ===
Three dusky dolphin subspecies are recognised by the SMM:

- The African dusky dolphin (A. o. obscurus, Gray, 1828)
- Fitzroy's dolphin (A. o. fitzroyi, Waterhouse, 1838)
- The Peruvian/Chilean dusky dolphin (A. o. posidonia, Philippi, 1893)

A fourth subspecies, the New Zealand dusky dolphin (L. o. superciliosus, Rice, 1998), has been proposed but is not accepted by the SMM. Dusky dolphin subspecies are divided based on geography but also differ in skull length and tooth number.

== Description ==
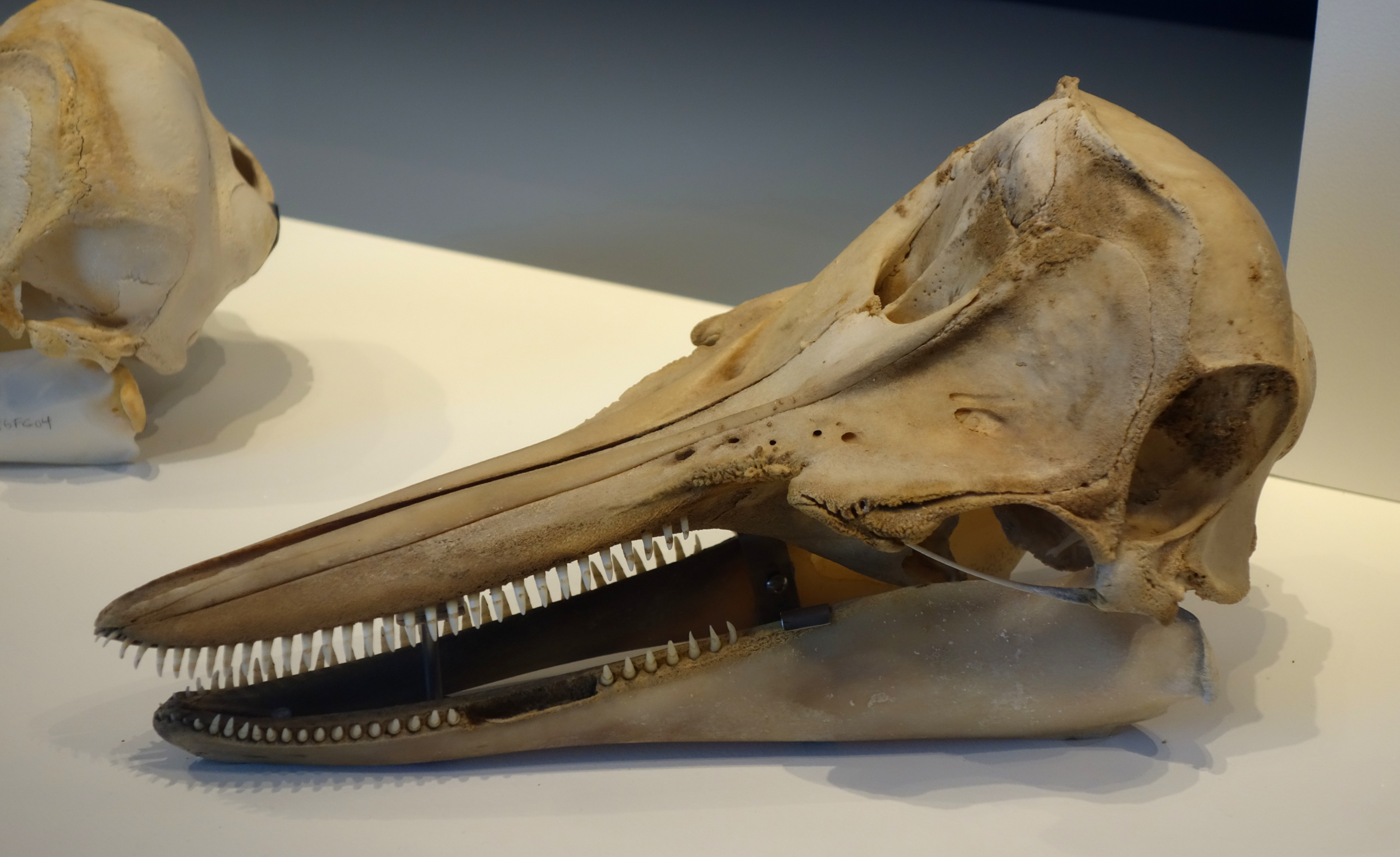
Dusky dolphin skull at Te Papa

The dusky dolphin is a small cetacean; specimens from New Zealand have been recorded at 167–178 cm (5.48–5.84 ft) in length and 69–78 kg (152–172 lb) in weight for females and 165–175 cm (5.41–5.74 ft) in length and 70–85 kg (154–187 lb) in weight for males. Peruvian dolphins may be larger, but this is based on small sample sizes; a female was measured at 204.5 cm (6.71 ft) and a male was measured at 206 cm (6.76 ft). Newborns have an average length of 91.2 cm (2.99 ft) and a weight of 9.6 kg (21 lb) off Peru.

The species has a somewhat stocky build, with a short, pointed beak, curved dorsal fin and flippers, and between 108 and 144 small, conical teeth. It has a distinctive colouration that resembles the Pacific white-sided dolphin, with a dark-grey or black upper side, orbital (eye) region, and beak; a light-grey face, chest area, and flank patch; and a white underside. The flank patch has an extension or blaze that reaches over the back and towards the blowhole. The dorsal fin is darker in front and lightens towards the back; the flippers are light-grey with darker edges. The dusky dolphin differs from the Pacific white-sided dolphin in having a more slender skull and a shorter blaze.

== Distribution ==
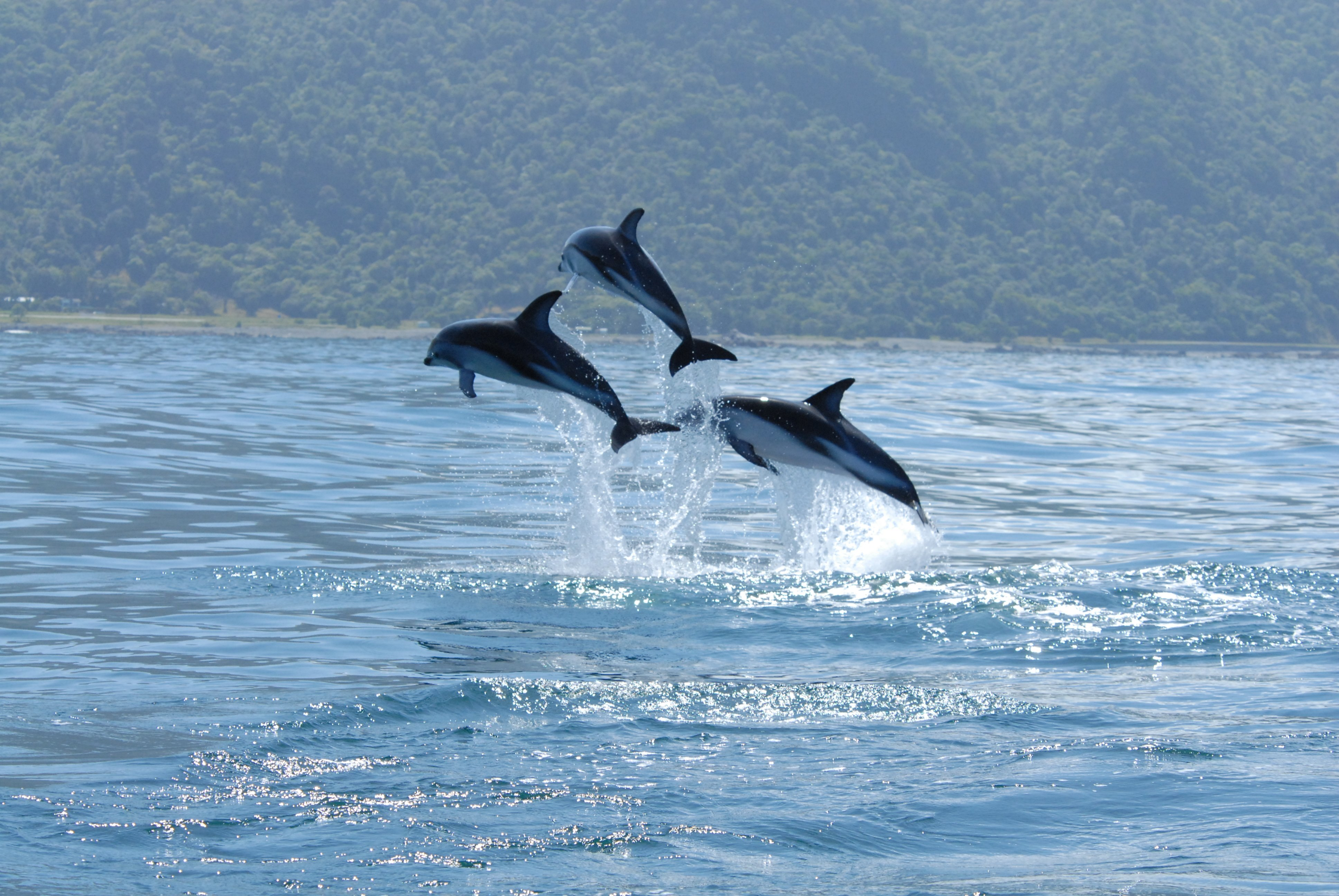
Dusky dolphins leaping off Kaikōura

The dusky dolphin has a discontiguous range in the Southern Hemisphere; including the coasts of western and southeastern South America, southwestern Africa, New Zealand, and some oceanic islands in the south Atlantic and Indian Ocean. It has also been sighted off southern Australia.

Dusky dolphins can be found throughout New Zealand waters and are most common along the eastern coasts, between East Cape on the North Island and Timaru/Oamaru on the South Island. They are sighted year-round in the stable, cold waters off the coast of the northern Canterbury Region. Off South America, they range from southern Peru to Cape Horn in the Pacific and then up to around 36°S in the Atlantic, along with the Falkland Islands, where they are thought to be less abundant. Off Africa, the dusky dolphin ranges from Lobito Bay, Angola, in the north to False Bay, South Africa, in the south. Within Australian waters, dusky dolphins have been recorded off Kangaroo Island, eastern Tasmania, and in the Bass Strait, although they are uncommon and may be transients from New Zealand. Dusky dolphins are also found around the islands of Tristan da Cunha, Prince Edward, Crozet, Île Amsterdam, and Île Saint-Paul.

== Ecology and behaviour ==
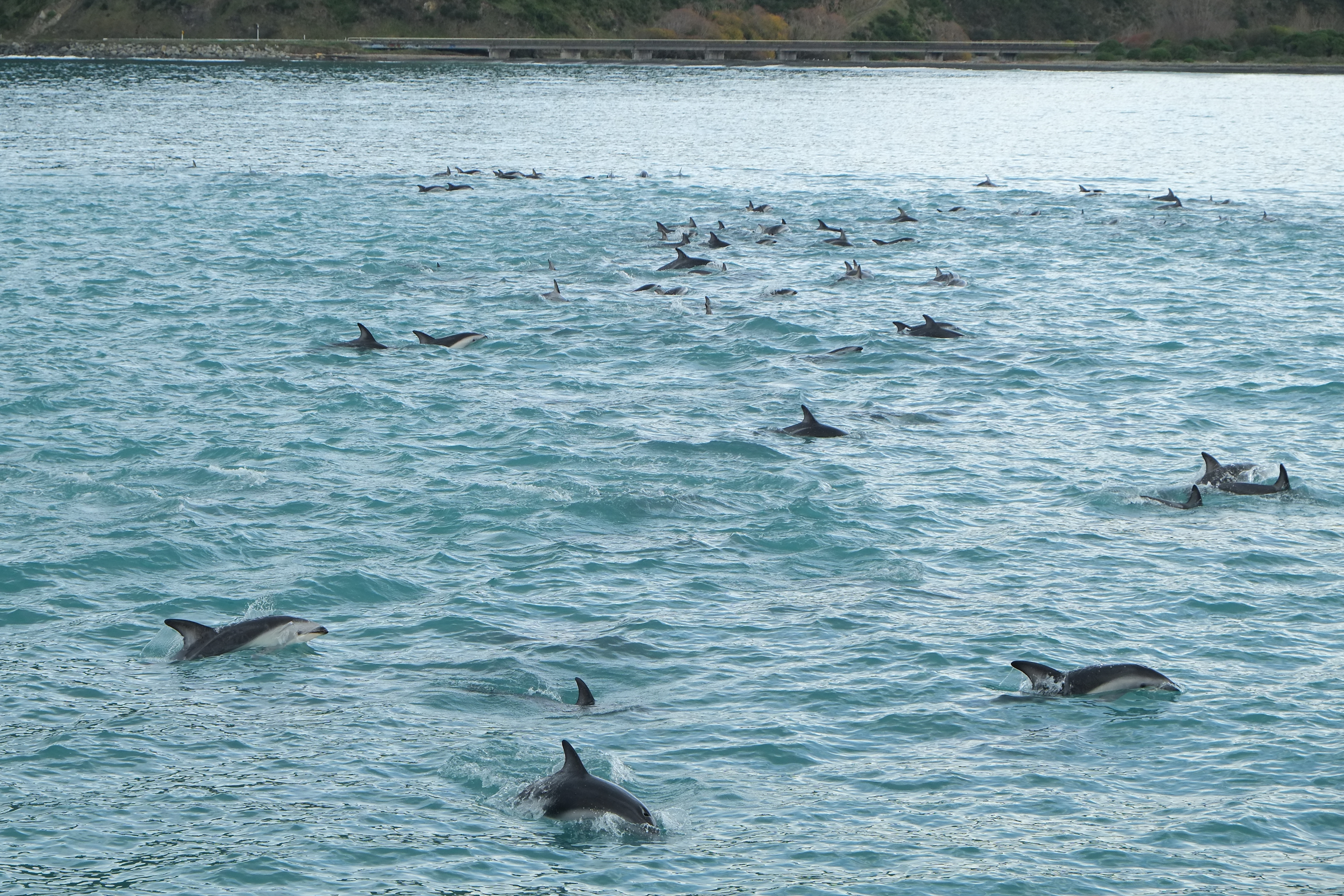
Large pod of dusky dolphins in South Bay, Kaikōura

Dusky dolphins live mostly in coastal waters within the continental shelf and prefer cool, upwelling waters, as well as cold currents. Dolphins off Argentina and New Zealand move to and from shore between day and night and between seasons. Seasonal migrations have been recorded between Kaikōura and Admiralty Bay, New Zealand. Around Kaikōura, the majority of individuals have only been seen once in the area over a 30-year period, suggesting high levels of immigration and emigration. Dusky dolphins were recorded swimming up to 10 metres per second (36 km/h; 22 mph) and diving up to 130 m (430 ft).

Most studies of foraging and social behaviour in the species have been conducted at Kaikōura, Admiralty Bay, and San Jorge Gulf, Argentina. Dusky dolphins live in a fission–fusion society and individuals move in and out of groups depending on social and environmental conditions. At Kaikōura, group sizes can reach 1,000 dolphins, while in Admiralty Bay, they peak at around 50 dolphins. Groups form for different activities, including foraging, resting, travelling, and socialising. At Kaikōura, groups are larger when resting and smaller when foraging, but the reverse is true at San Jorge Gulf. At Admiralty Bay, foraging leads to larger aggregations; resting does not appear to correlate with group size. Most associations between individuals are weak but long-term bonds do occur.

Dusky dolphins can be found in mixed groups with other cetacean species, including common dolphins, southern right whales, Risso's dolphins, southern right whale dolphins, and pilot whales. Off Argentina, they have been found around bottlenose dolphins, but seem to ignore them. Dusky dolphins also feed with non-cetacean species such as South American sea lions, kelp gulls, cormorants, terns, shearwaters, petrels, albatrosses, and Magellanic penguins off Argentina, and Australasian gannets, shearwaters, terns, gulls, spotted shags, New Zealand fur seals, spiny dogfish, and common threshers off New Zealand.

=== Vocalisations and echolocation ===
Like other oceanic dolphins, dusky dolphins produce three basic types of sounds: echolocative click trains, burst pulses and tonal whistles. Their echolocation signals are quick and broadband, much like in other whistle-producing species, and have two peaks: between 40 and 50 kHz at low frequency and between 80 and 110 kHz at high frequency. Burst pulses are similar to echolocation signals but the pauses between clicks are shorter, at 0.5–10 milliseconds. Off New Zealand and Argentina, they often consist of 2–14 clicks in succession and appear to be important for communication. Whistling is more common when dusky dolphins mingle with other dolphin species such as common dolphins.

=== Foraging ===
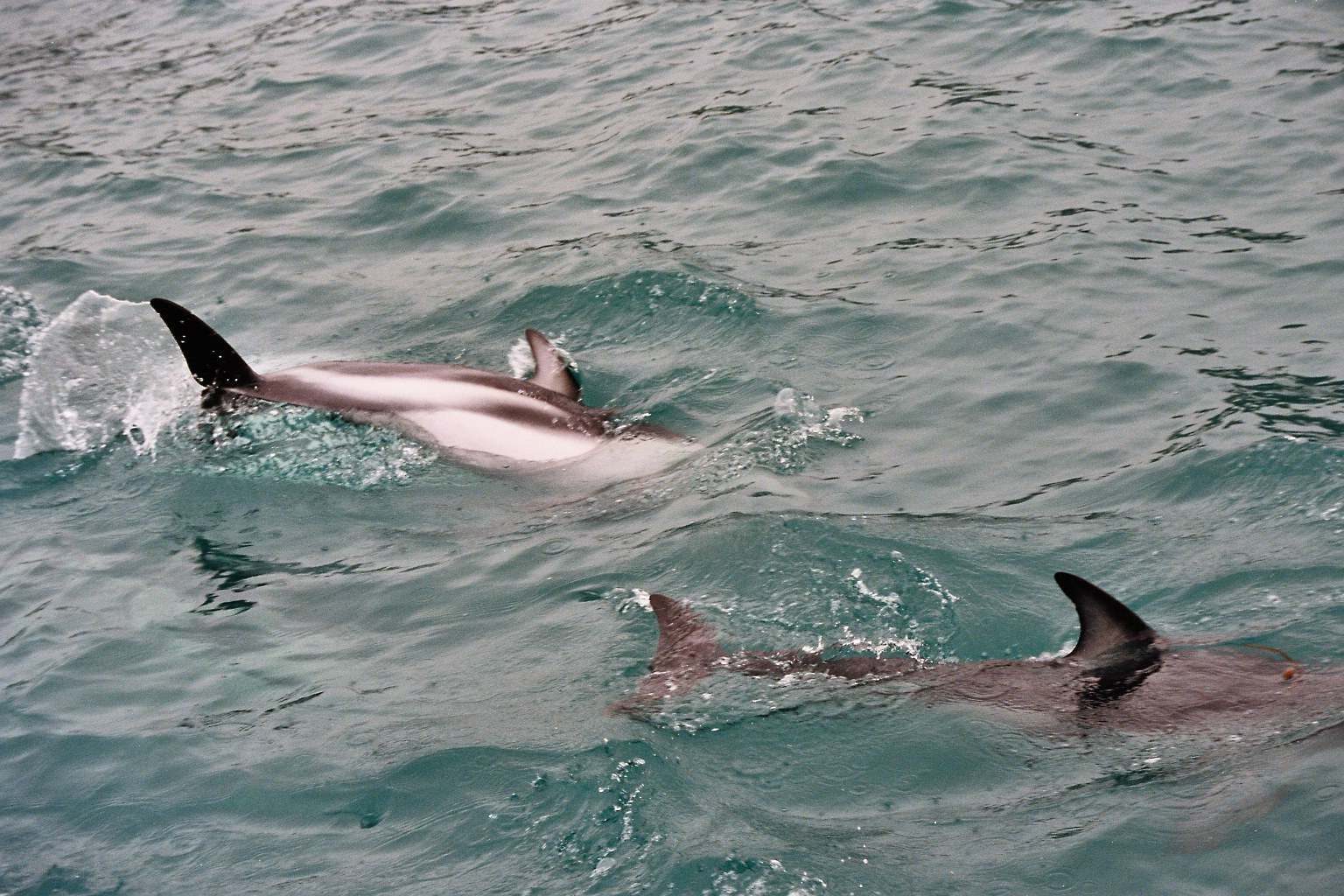
Dusky dolphins swimming at the surface

Dusky dolphins mainly feed on fish and squid. Fish species eaten include anchovies, lantern fish, pilchards, sculpins, hakes, horse mackerel, hoki, and red cod; the squids they prey on include those of the genera Nototodarus, Todarodes, and Loligo. Dusky dolphins are generally coordinated hunters, and their flexible foraging strategies can change depending on the environment. In the Kaikōura Canyon, where deep oceanic waters meet the coast, they forage at night in layers of scattered organisms. Dolphins travel to the hunting site individually and form groups when in the layer. The number of individuals in these groups ranges up to five members and decreases to single dolphins as the layer descends down the water column.

In San Jorge Gulf, between October and January, and Admiralty Bay, between August and November, dusky dolphins herd schools of fish into bait balls during the day. They use the water surface as a barrier for the fish as they circle around them. and may also scare them with sound or by flashing their white bellies. The larger the group, the more effective dolphins are in herding the school. These hunts may also involve other species, including other dolphins, seabirds, sharks, and pinnipeds. Common dolphins seem to participate in herding with dusky dolphins. By contrast, pinnipeds, sharks, and other predatory fish take food without helping in the hunt, and foraging by diving birds like gannets can make herding more strenuous for dolphins. From May to October in San Jorge Gulf and between May and July at Admiralty Bay, dusky dolphins hunt deeper below the surface.

=== Reproduction and parenting ===
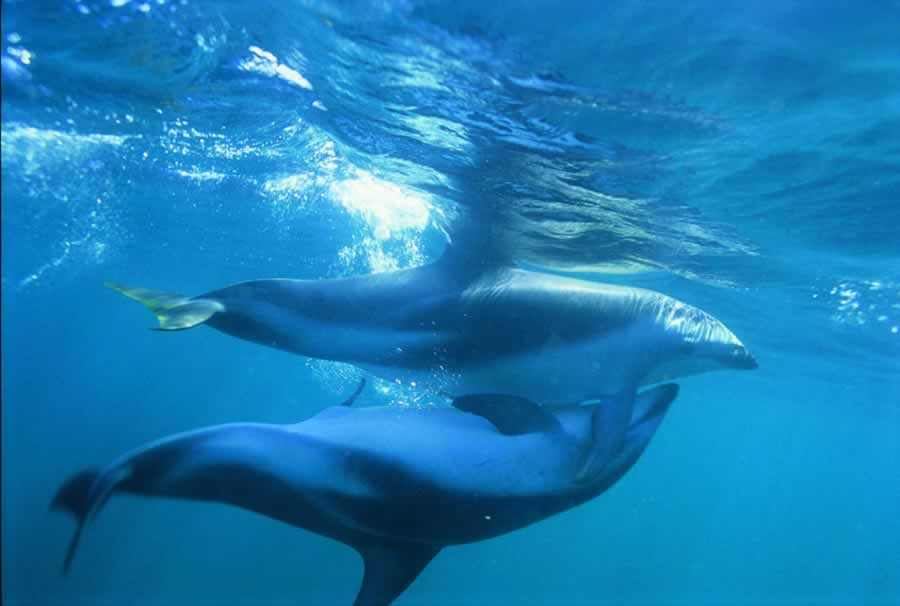
Dusky dolphins mating

Dusky dolphins reach sexual maturity between four and eight years depending on the region. They have a polygynandrous mating system in which both males and females mate with multiple partners. Hence, males have large testes for sperm competition. Mating groups typically consist of multiple males and one female; at Kaikōura, groups usually have a total of five members but can vary from two to fifteen. They can be found in both shallow and deep water but more often congregate near shore.

Within a mating group, the males pursue a female in a high-speed chase. Females appear to prefer males with great speed and agility over size, strength, or aggression, and try to evade males that are less energetic and lack social skills. Males also form alliances to capture females. Off Kaikōura, dusky dolphins have been found to have scars and notches on their dorsal fins, thought to be caused by aggression between males and towards females during mating. A study in the same area did not observe aggression in mating groups; males did not fight among themselves nor control who could be part of the group but did interfere with copulations. During mating, female dusky dolphins usually take the top position. Dusky dolphins also engage in non-reproductive sexual behaviour, including homosexual behaviour, perhaps for greeting, communication, or strengthening social bonds, and there is no high-speed chasing.

Female dusky dolphins off the coast of Peru were found to have gestation periods of over 12 months. Calves are born during the spring (August to October) off Peru and in summer (November to February) off Argentina, South Africa, and New Zealand. Females with calves tend to congregate in nursery groups, which may provide them more time to rest and facilitate socialisation among the young. Calves learn to hunt from their mothers, and nursery groups typically forage in shallow water because deeper water is too dangerous for young, particularly because of predators. Nursery groups keep away from mating groups, as adult males will aggressively chase mothers and leave calves dazed and vulnerable. Conversely, females with calves will associate with non-breeding adults in large groups. Near Peru, calves may be weaned around 12 months, and the female can breed again less than four months after that.

=== Aerial behaviour ===
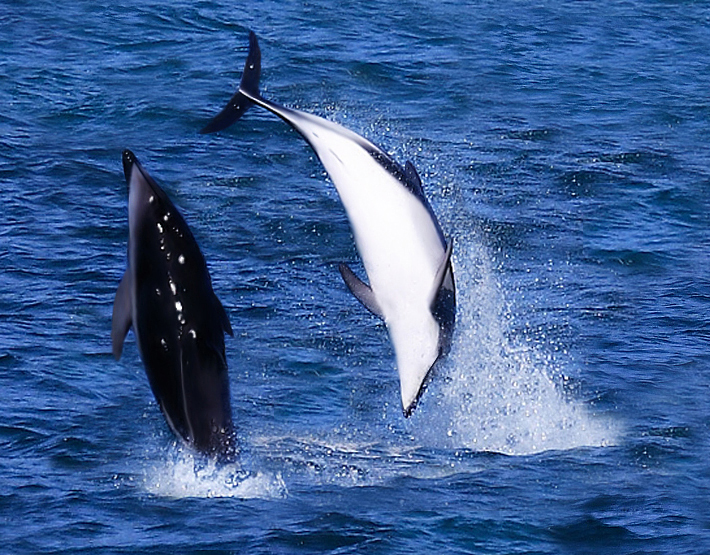
Dusky dolphins leaping and flipping

Dusky dolphins perform several kinds of leaping displays, which are classed into noisy, clean, acrobatic, and coordinated. Noisy leaps end in splashes upon re-entry and include back slaps, head slaps, side slaps, tail slaps and belly flops. For clean leaps, the dolphin leaps with the body vertical and lands with little to no splashing. These include headfirst re-entries and "humpings", both of which involve the dolphin leaving the water, arching its back and then flipping the tail before plunging headfirst. For humpings, the dolphin is arched after the nose enters the water and before the tail leaves. Acrobatic leaps are complex and consist of head-over-tail flips or somersaults and spins, both of which can cause splashes. Coordinated leaps are synchronised between two or more individuals.

These leaps probably have several functions. One study in Admiralty Bay found that clean leaping may play a role in hunting prey, with coordinated leaps marking the end of the hunts and also perhaps serving a social function. Noisy leaps appear to cause more activity among the group. The ability to make these leaps is apparently not inborn but learnt. Calves appear to learn jump styles in the following order: noisy leaps, clean leaps, coordinated leaps, and acrobatic leaps.

=== Mortality and health ===
Dusky dolphins may live 26–30 years. They are preyed on by orcas and sharks and may swim into shallower water near shore where there is less risk of being attacked from below or the sides. Dusky dolphins are also susceptible to internal parasitism by nematode, cestode, and trematode species. Off Peru, parasites include those of the genera Nasitrema and Anisakis, and the species Phyllobothrium delphini, Braunina cordiformis, and Pholeter gasterophilus; a study of dolphins off Patagonia found that the most common parasites were Anisakis simplex, Braunina cordiformis, and species of the genus Hadwenius. Dusky dolphins may suffer tattoo-like skin lesions caused by a poxvirus, as well as genital diseases such as ovarian cysts, uterine tumours, vaginal stones and testicular lesions. In a sample of dusky dolphins off Peru, 66% of them had genital warts caused by a papillomavirus.

== Interactions with humans ==
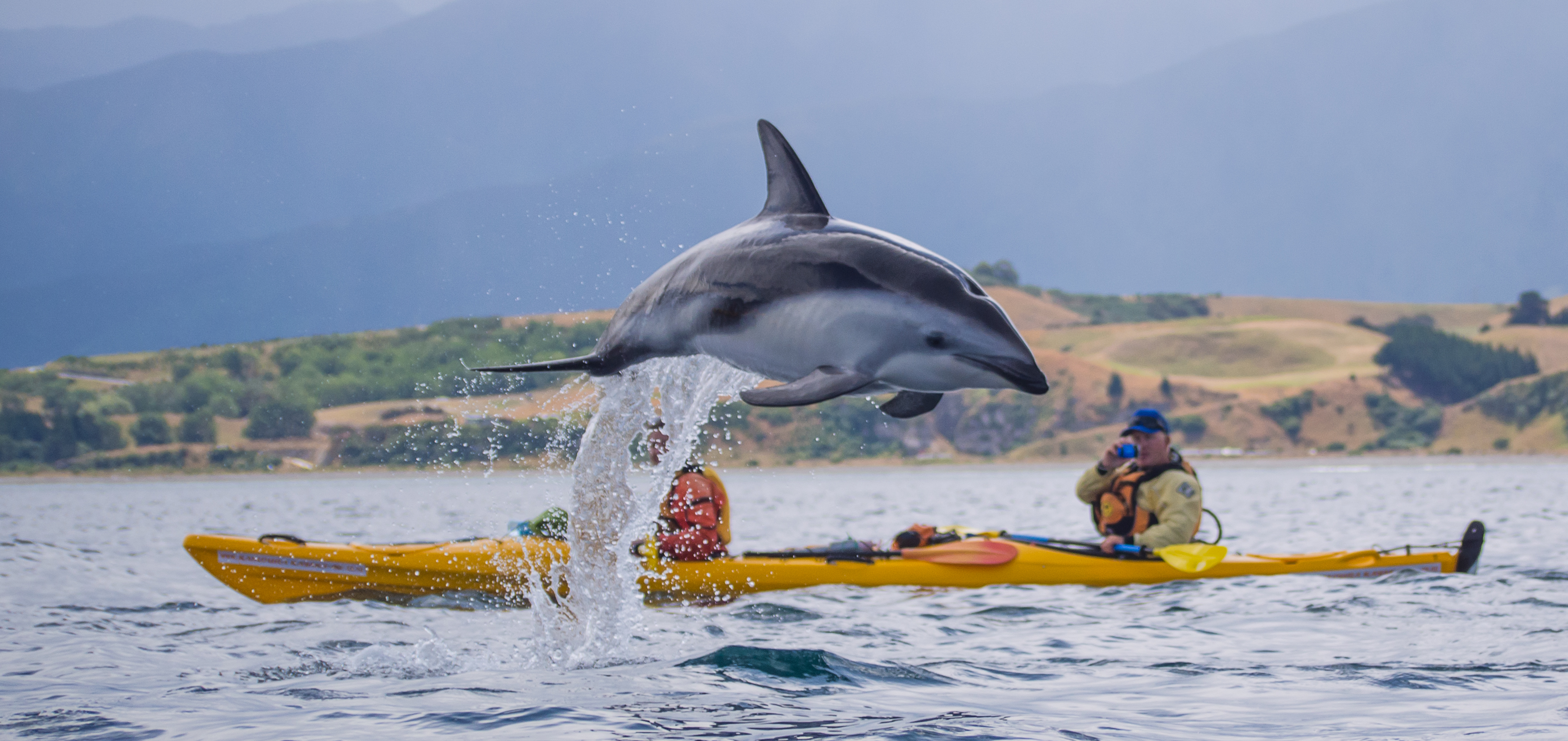
Dolphin-watching tour, Kaikōura, New Zealand

Dusky dolphins are popular attractions for dolphin watching tours. In Patagonia, dolphin watching started as an alternative to whale watching, the dusky and Commerson's dolphins being the main attractions since 1997. In 2001, 90% of boat trips encountered dusky dolphins, up from 25% two years before. Dusky dolphin watching is also popular in New Zealand, whose dolphin-watching industry started in the late 1980s as a side attraction to sperm whale watching. By 2010, the number of official whale- and dolphin-watching tour operators in the country had risen to around 75.

The presence of vessels has the potential to disrupt dusky dolphin activities. Dolphins may lose energy interacting with or avoiding vessels—energy they could use for socialising and feeding. Boats also create noise pollution, which makes it harder for dolphins to communicate. As such, authorities have imposed regulations on tours, including limits on the number of permits as well as guidelines on approaching the animals. Dusky dolphins can also benefit from encounters with boats by riding the waves they produce (bow-riding), which saves energy while travelling.

The building of mussel farms in Admiralty Bay seems to have led to a decline in the number and group size of dolphins passing through, and they herd prey less when near the farms. These farms are also obstacles for echolocation. Dolphins rarely enter mussel farms, and when they do they quickly swim through them.

== Status ==
The dusky dolphin is classified as Least Concern by the IUCN Red List as many populations appear to be healthy and stable. The dusky dolphin is listed in Appendix II of the Convention on the Conservation of Migratory Species of Wild Animals, meaning that it has an "unfavourable conservation status" and may require international cooperation organised by tailored agreements. The total population is unknown; off New Zealand, dusky dolphins may number around 12,000, and over 6,500 dolphins have been counted from Valdés Peninsula to Puerto Deseado, Argentina. One study found that dusky dolphins in Golfo Nuevo had an increasing population trend, with an average population growth of over 4% between 2004 and 2022.

Dusky dolphins may fall victim to the illegal fisheries that kill small cetaceans off Peru and Chile. The expansion of these fisheries could have started in Peru when the anchoveta fishery collapsed in 1972. Dusky dolphins are killed in large numbers (10,000–15,000 per year) for use as shark bait or for human consumption. This has led to a status of Vulnerable for the Peruvian subspecies. Off New Zealand, gill nets have also been a threat, though bycatches seem to have decreased since the 1970s and 1980s. Compared to marine mammals living more to the north, dusky dolphins are less contaminated by marine pollutants like DDT and persistent organic pollutants.

== See also ==
- List of cetaceans
- Mammals of New Zealand
