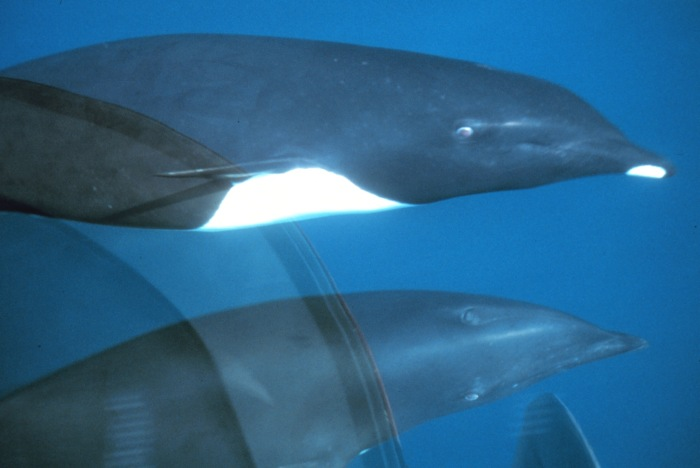
- Northern species, Lissodelphis borealis

Scientific classification
- Kingdom: Animalia
- Phylum: Chordata
- Class: Mammalia
- Order: Artiodactyla
- Infraorder: Cetacea
- Family: Delphinidae
- Subfamily: Lissodelphininae
- Genus: Lissodelphis; Gloger, 1841

Type species
- Delphinus peronii Lacépède, 1804

Species
- L. borealis Peale, 1848; L. peronii Lacépède, 1804
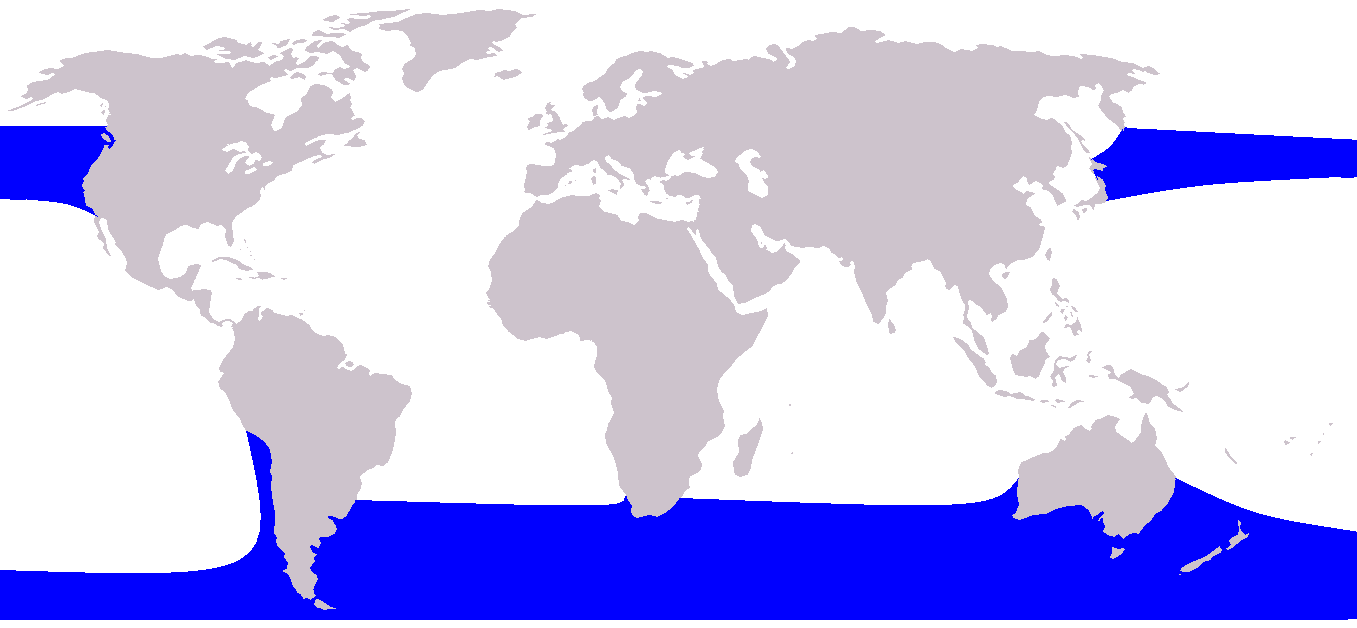
- Northern and southern right whale dolphin ranges

= Right whale dolphin =

Right whale dolphins

Genus of mammals

Right whale dolphins are cetaceans belonging to the genus Lissodelphis. It contains the northern right whale dolphin (Lissodelphis borealis) and the southern right whale dolphin (Lissodelphis peronii). These cetaceans are predominantly black, white beneath, and some of the few without a dorsal fin or ridge. They are smaller members of the delphinid family, oceanic dolphins, and very slender. Despite scientists being long acquainted with the species (the Northern species was identified by Titian Peale in 1848 and the Southern by Bernard Germain de la Cépède in 1804), little is known about them in terms of life history and behaviour.

== Physical description ==
Size comparison with a human (northern species)

Both species have slender bodies, small, pointed flippers and a small fluke. Conspicuously, neither species has a dorsal fin; nor do right whales and this may explain the dolphins' name. The northern right whale dolphin is the only dolphin in the Pacific with this property. Similarly, the Southern is the only finless dolphin in the southern hemisphere. The two species can be readily distinguished (apart from the geographical separation in their ranges) by the extent of the whiteness on the body. Both have white bellies; however, the area of white coloration on the Southern species covers much more of the body — including the flanks, flippers, beak and forehead.

Northern males are about 220 cm (87 in) long at sexual maturity. Females are 200 cm (79 in). Both sexes become mature at about 10 years. New-born right whale dolphins are about half the length of their parents. The southern species is typically larger (up to 250 cm (98 in)) and heavier (up to 100 kg (220 lb) compared with the Northern's maximum of 80–90 kg (180–200 lb)). The dolphins live for about 40 years.

== Intelligence ==
Northern right whale dolphins have an encephalization quotient (a proposed correlate of intelligence) of 5.55, which is the highest for any living species except humans.

== Distribution ==
The northern right whale dolphin is widely distributed in the temperate North Pacific in a band running from Kamchatka and mainland Japan in the west to British Columbia down to the Baja California Peninsula in the east. It is not known with certainty if they follow a migratory pattern. However, individuals have been observed close to the Californian shore following their main food source, squid, in winter and spring. Such sightings have not been recorded in summer. Otherwise these dolphins are pelagic. No global population estimates exist. There are an estimated 14,000 individuals close to the North American shoreline.

The southern right whale dolphin has a circumpolar distribution running from about 40° to 55°. They are sighted in the Tasman Sea in particular.

== Behaviour ==
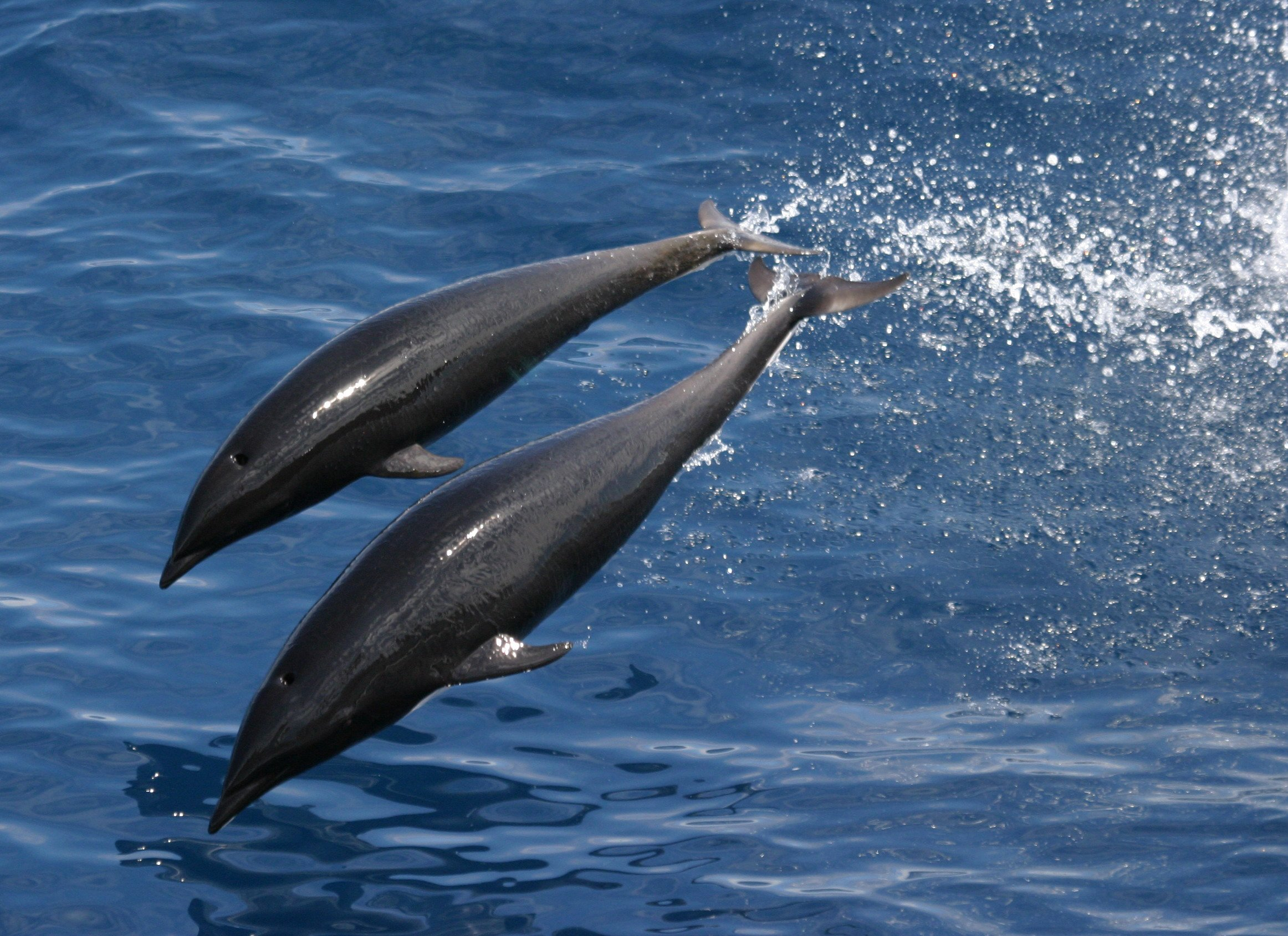
Right whale dolphins lack dorsal fins. Shown is the northern species, so the only white parts are the bellies, hidden from this angle.

Both species are highly gregarious. They move in pods of several hundred individuals and sometimes congregate in groups of 3000. The groups may also contain dusky dolphins and pilot whales (in the south) and Pacific white-sided dolphins (in the north). These dolphins are some of the fastest swimmers (in excess of 40 km/h). They can by turns become very boisterous and breach and tail-slap or become very quiet and almost undetectable at sea. At high speed they can leap up to 7 metres across the ocean's surface in a graceful bouncing motion.

The species will generally avoid boats, but bow-riding has been recorded on occasion.

A single and rare stranding has been recorded for the northern species. On 9 June 2018, a 5.5-foot female was found deceased on Manzanita Beach on the coast of Oregon. There has been one recorded instance of 77 southern right whale dolphins stranding on Chatham Island.

== Conservation ==
The southern species is under pressure from Peruvian whaling operations. The northern species has never been commercially targeted. However, tens of thousands of the northern species were killed in the 1980s due to their becoming caught in oceanic drift gillnets introduced at that time. Gillnets were banned by the United Nations in 1993. Conservation campaigners work vigorously to try to ensure these bans are retained.

Attempts to keep right whale dolphins in aquaria have all ended in failure and death. In all cases but one, they have died within three weeks.
