= Aethalodelphis =

Scientific classification
- Kingdom: Animalia
- Phylum: Chordata
- Class: Mammalia
- Infraclass: Placentalia
- Order: Artiodactyla
- Infraorder: Cetacea
- Family: Delphinidae
- Genus: Aethalodelphis; Galatius, et al., 2025

Species
- Aethalodelphis obliquidens Aethalodelphis obscurus

Genus of mammals

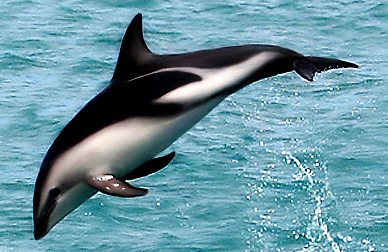

Aethalodelphis is a genus of dolphins that was erected in 2025. The Pacific white-sided dolphin (Aethalodelphis obliquidens) and dusky dolphin (Aethalodelphis obscurus) are the only members of the genus. These species were formerly included in the genus Lagenorhynchus, but several studies demonstrated that Lagenorhynchus as previously constituted was polyphyletic. As a result, in 2025 the Pacific white-sided dolphin and dusky dolphin were reclassified into the new genus Aethalodelphis.
