= Campululidae =

Scientific classification
- Kingdom: Animalia
- Phylum: Platyhelminthes
- Class: Trematoda
- Order: Plagiorchiida
- Suborder: Echinostomata
- Family: Campululidae

Family of flatworms

Campululidae is a family of flatworms belonging to the order Plagiorchiida.

Genera:

- Hadwenius
- Orthosplanchus
