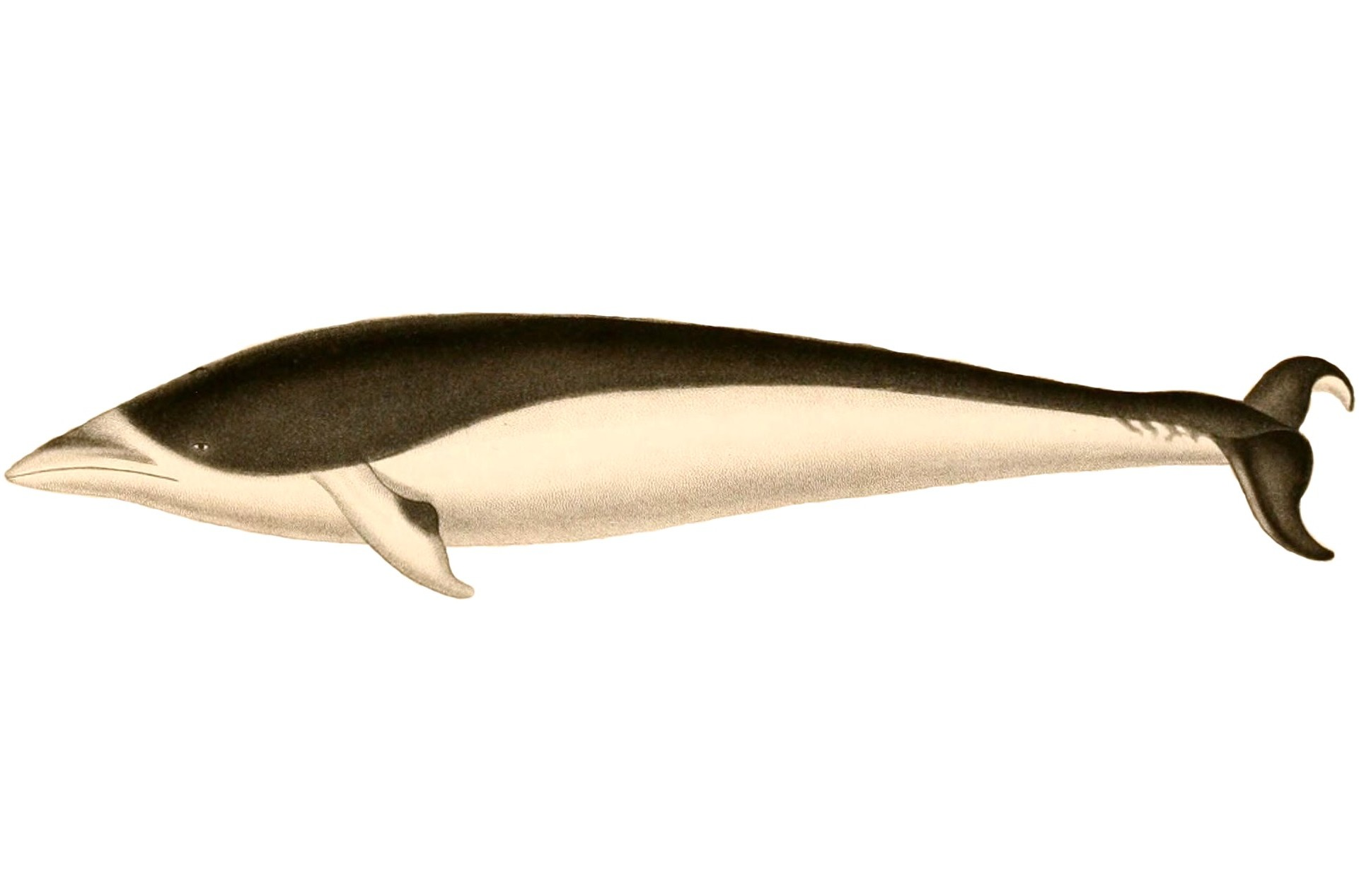
- A French drawing from 1847
- Size compared to an average human

Conservation status
- Least Concern (IUCN 3.1)
- CITES Appendix II (CITES)

Scientific classification
- Kingdom: Animalia
- Phylum: Chordata
- Class: Mammalia
- Order: Artiodactyla
- Infraorder: Cetacea
- Family: Delphinidae
- Genus: Lissodelphis
- Species: L. peronii

Binomial name
- Lissodelphis peronii Lacépède, 1804
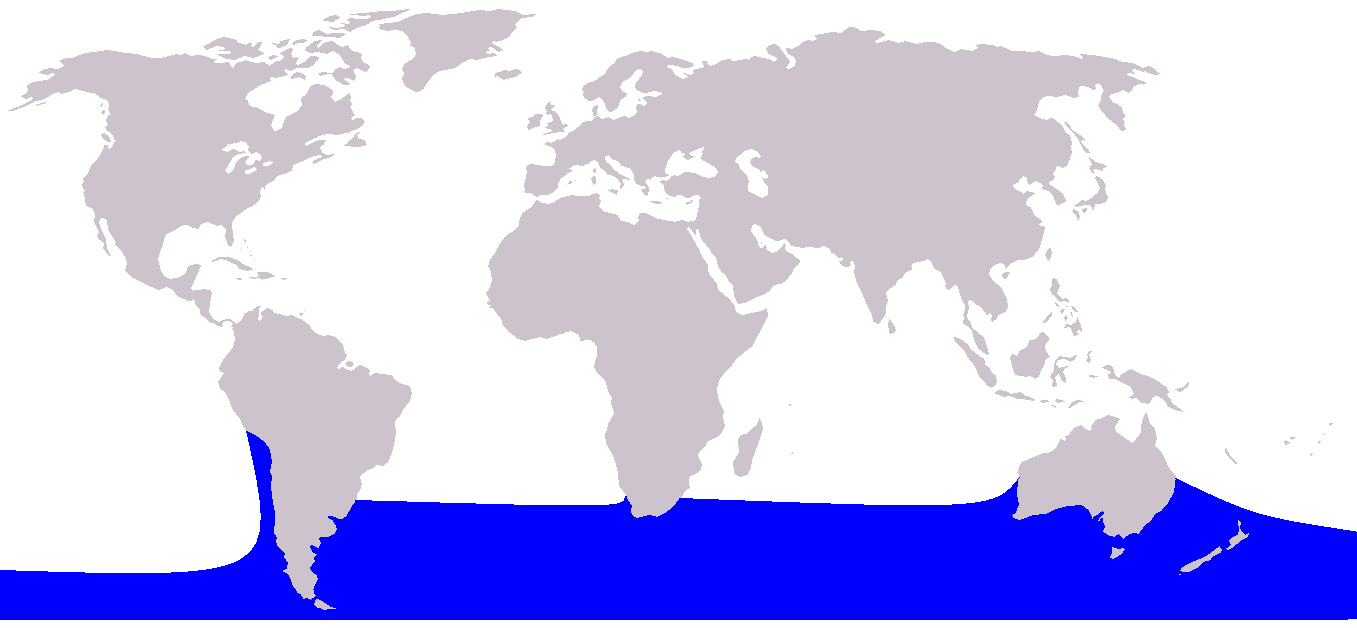
- Range map

= Southern right whale dolphin =

Species of mammal

The southern right whale dolphin (Lissodelphis peronii) is a small and slender species of cetacean, found in cool waters of the Southern Hemisphere. It is one of two species of right whale dolphin (genus Lissodelphis). This genus is characterized by the lack of a dorsal fin. The other species, the northern right whale dolphin (Lissodelphis borealis), is found in deep oceans of the Northern Hemisphere and has a different pigmentation pattern than the southern right whale dolphin.

== Taxonomy ==
The species was first published by Bernard Germain de Lacépède in 1804. The southern right whale dolphins together with the northern right whale dolphins are the only members of the genus Lissodelphis, which name is derived from the Greek, with lisso meaning smooth, and delphis meaning dolphin. Recent classifications have placed Lissodelphis within the Delphinidae, the oceanic dolphin family of cetaceans. The specific epithet peronii commemorates François Péron, a French naturalist who saw the species near Tasmania during an expedition in 1802. Although some doubts remain on the validity of these two species, most authors currently retain them as separate species.

Both species in the genus are referred to by the name "right whale dolphin", a name derived from the right whales (Eubalaena) which also lack a dorsal fin. Other common names for the southern right whale dolphin include: whitebellied right whale dolphin, southern right whale porpoise, mealy-mouthed porpoise, tunina (tonina) sin aleta (Spanish), delfin (delphin) liso austral (Spanish), minami semi-iruka (Japanese), dauphin de Peron (French), yuzhnyi kitovidnyi delfin (Russian), Südlicher Glattdelfin (German), and zuidelijke gladde dolfijn (Dutch).

== Description ==
Southern right whale dolphins can be easily distinguished from other cetacean species within their range as they are the only dolphins without dorsal fins in the Southern Hemisphere. They have streamlined and graceful bodies, a single blowhole and a short and defined beak, possessing between 39 and 50 teeth per row.

A sharp dividing line separates the black dorsal part from the white ventral part of the body, running from the tail stock forward, dipping down to the flipper insertion and sweeping back up, below the eyes, to cross the melon between the blowhole and snout crease. Younger individuals can be grey/brownish dorsally but develop adult coloration within the first year. The flippers of the southern right whale dolphins are small, recurved, predominantly white and located about one-quarter of the way back from the snout tip. Their flukes are small, have a white underside and dark grey upper side, with a notch in the middle and concave trailing edges.

Variability in the size of these black and white areas exists. More extensive anomalous pigmentation has been observed, with records of pure all-white individuals, as well as melanistic (all-black) individuals. In 1998, a potential hybrid of a southern right whale dolphin and a dusky dolphin (Lagenorhynchus obscurus) was observed and subsequently described in 2002. This animal showed intermediate morphological features between the two species.

Newborn calves measure around 86 cm (34 in) in length and weigh around 5 kg (11 lb), while adults range between 2.18 and 2.5 m (7 ft 2 in and 8 ft 2 in) and weight between 60–100 kg (130–220 lb) on average. The maximum weight for southern right whale dolphins is 116 kg, with maximum lengths reaching 297 cm (117 in) in males and 230 cm (91 in) in females but few specimens have been examined and it is expected they grow larger. On average, males tend to grow slightly larger than females. Little is known of this species' reproductive biology. Research suggests that males reach sexual maturity at lengths between 212–220 cm (83–87 in) and females between 206–212 cm (81–83 in).

== Population status ==
There are no current global abundance and mortality estimates of the species although it is considered a fairly common and abundant species along its range, particularly in Chile. The very low sighting rate is most likely caused by a lack of sampling effort and due to the difficulties of sighting the animals in their offshore habitat.

== Distribution ==
Southern right whale dolphins have a circumpolar distribution across the Southern Hemisphere, generally occurring in cool temperate to Sub-Antarctic waters between 30°S and 65°S. The precise boundary of their range has not been estimated or closely studied but the southern limit of the species appears to be bounded by the Antarctic Convergence while the northern limit seems bounded by the Tropical Convergence although rare sightings beyond these limits have been recorded. Most sightings of the southern right whale dolphins occur in offshore and deep waters, with temperatures ranging between 1 and 20 °C. In regions where deep waters approach the coast and in upwelling areas, they have occasionally been observed near shore.

=== South America ===
The species is known to be abundant along the western coasts of South America, ranging from Cape Horn (55°58'S) to Arica (18°28'S), with the northernmost record at 12°30'S near Pucusana (Peru). Although the southern right whale dolphin is considered abundant, only few confirmed records of the species in the Eastern South Pacific exist.

Preliminary boat surveys and stranding and fishery records suggest that southern right whale dolphins may be one of the most common species of cetacean in northern Chile. The range extends until 170 km (110 mi) offshore north of 40°S and 250 km (160 mi) off the southern coast of Chile and it has been suggested that at least a part of this Chilean population migrates northbound in the austral winter and spring, when the coastal component of the cold Humboldt Current and cool coastal upwelling are strongest. An extension of the range to the North, associated to cold-water currents and food availability, has also been observed in Brazil, where a stranded individual was found in 1995 in an area where the warm Brazil Current meets the cold Malvinas Current.

In 2018, two groups were sighted in the western area of the Strait of Magellan in Chile. It was unclear through which route and why they entered the Magellan Strait but these were the first sightings of live southern right whales dolphins in this shallow area. A few reports of solitary stranded specimens in exterior channels south of 40°S and the Beagle Channel have also shown their occurrence inside shallow channel systems. It has been hypothesized they may enter these channels accidentally or because of poor health. In the past, a high number of stranded southern right whale dolphins were reported on beaches of north-central chile, most of which were discarded animals by-caught In fishing nets. An increase in strandings is possibly due to the developing swordfish gillnet fishery off northern Chile.

The waters of the Patagonian continental shelf of Argentina harbor a high diversity of cetaceans, including southern right whale dolphins. They are known to occur in cold waters off Santa Cruz Province, the Falkland Islands, as well as off Tierra del Fuego. Sightings in coastal areas are rare but exist in Mar del Plata and in Golfo Nuevo, where three southern right whale dolphins were observed once during the summer of 1992.

=== Africa ===
In Southern Africa, the range is associated with cold currents up the western and southern coasts, ranging northwards as far as about 23°S due to the cold counter clockwise Benguela Current. The species has been found to occur year-round in a localized area on the southwestern coast of Namibia, in Lüderitz, linked to the strong Lüderitz upwelling cell area and high productivity waters. These animals may occasionally extend their range into South African waters although more sampling effort is needed to support this. Just one confirmed sighting of the species exists from the South African coast, just south of the Orange River. Southern right whale dolphins have also been observed in waters around Marion Island.

=== Australia ===
The species has been observed in Australian waters since 1802, although only few actual records exist since then. They are found off southern continental Australia including sightings south and southwestward of Tasmania, in the Great Australian Bight and off south-western Australia. One pair was sighted on the 20th of October 1910 at 42°51S, 153°56E, approximately 460 km to the east of Australia, in the Tasman Sea. No localised areas where the species occurs year-round are known from the coast of Australia, although more survey effort could result in the identification of these areas, similar to the one off the west coast of Namibia.

Few stranded individuals have been documented in Australian waters. In December 2019, a dolphin washed up on a beach at Port Fairy, Victoria, with the deceased animal being assessed by state authorities, researchers and local Australian aboriginal elders. Another dolphin washed up in January 2020 and was photographed, but the dead animal washed back off the beach. The dual strandings were described as 'very unusual' by authorities.

=== New Zealand ===
One of the earliest records of this species in New Zealand waters was during the Terra Nova Expedition, when a pair was sighted approximately 145 km west-south-west of Nugget Point Lighthouse, South Island at 47°04'S, 171°33'E. Southern right whale dolphins have been observed at sea to the southeast of New Zealand and are largely found between the Subtropical Convergence and the subantarctic waters to the south of it, between surface temperatures of 9°-17 °C.

The first recorded photographs of the species globally, were from a stranding of three individuals in New Zealand in 1952, which were apparently rescued. Since then there have been a number of strandings around the country, including seven events between 1970 and 1981 and a mass stranding of 75 individuals occurred at the Chatham In 1988. More recently a stranding of a single animal occurred at Mahia Beach, North Island in April 2020 which was euthanised by the Department of Conservation. The northernmost record of a stranding in New Zealand was of a ~200 cm long male at Whananaki (35° 31'S, 174° 28'), Northland, in November 1979.

Southern right whale dolphins are occasionally observed off the coast of Kaikōura, on the eastern coast of South Island, typically in groups of 50–200, although larger groups of >500 are also encountered. In 1967, research showed that the species could also be found off-shore from the Chatham, Bounty and Antipodes Islands (approximately 43-57°S, 168-158°E) between January and March.

== Behavior ==
=== Social ===
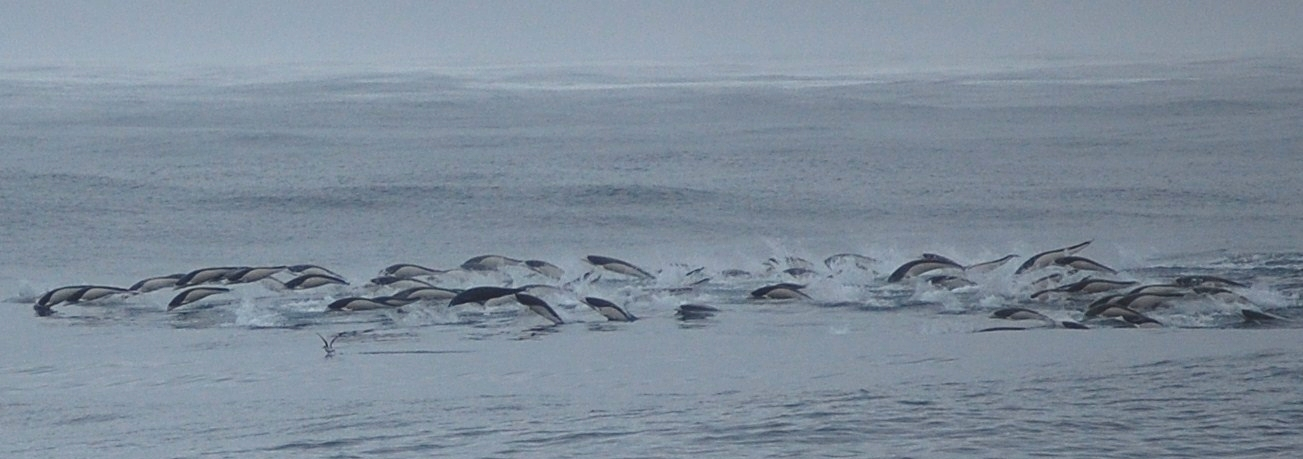
Southern right whale dolphins porpoising. One melanistic individual can be observed in this group (on the foreground in the middle)

Southern right whale dolphins are generally gregarious and have been documented in aggregations of more than 1000 individuals although small groups of one to 10 have also been reported. Mean group size estimates differ and range between 52 and 368 off northern Chile, however, they typically live in groups of 100-200 individuals. Pods of just a few animals have also been observed, often associated with other cetacean species. Mixed groups with Dusky dolphins (Lagenorhynchus obscurus) appear common in the southern Atlantic and have occasionally been reported in New-Zealand, off Southwest Africa and along the coast of southern Chile. They have been observed to intermix freely with pilot whales (Globicephala spp.) and in Chile, associations with common dolphins (Delphinus delphis) have been reported. Along their range they have also occasionally been sighted with hourglass dolphins (Lagenorhynchus cruciger), common bottlenose dolphins (Tursiops truncatus) and fin whales (Balaenoptera physalus).

Four basic herd configuration types have been reported and conform to the types described for the northern right whale dolphin: (1) Densely packed schools, without identifiable subgroups; (2) herds of scattered subgroups of various sizes; (3) V-shaped herds; and (4) herds in chorus line formation. Their movement is very graceful and they often move by leaping out of the water continuously. When they swim slowly, they expose only a small area of the head and back while surfacing to breathe. When travelling at higher speeds they have been observed to either (1) swim just below the surface, surfacing briefly to breathe and then submerge or (2) swim rapidly at the surface, performing low-angle leaps covering much surface distance. Breaching, belly-flopping, side-slapping, and lob-tailing (slapping the flukes on the water surface) have been witnessed. Some groups will avoid boats, whereas others approach and possibly bow-ride. Few direct speed measurements at sea exist but swimming speed has been reported to be 22 km/h (14 mph).

=== Foraging ===
Southern right whale dolphins prey on an undetermined range of fish, but it has been suggested they prey primarily on mesopelagic fish and squid, and may dive to depths in excess of 200 m (660 ft) in search of food. However, little is known of their particular habits, and it is unknown whether they generally search for their food at these greater depths or near the surface. Based on stomach contents, epipelagic coastal food habits, mesopelagic or a combination of both were suggested for southern right whale dolphins. Geographical variability in prey species has been observed by comparing stomach contents of animals from central Chile and New Zealand.

The species itself is presumably occasionally predated upon by larger sharks and killer whales (Orcinus orca) however, other predators might exist. In 1983, an intact dolphin measuring 0.86 m (2 ft 10 in) was found in the stomach of a 1.7 m (5 ft 7 in) Patagonian toothfish (Dissostichus eleginoides) taken off central Chile, and in 1990, a foetus was discovered inside a sleeper shark (Somniosus cf. pacificus).

== Threats ==
Overall, clear evidence of the impact of potential threats on the species are sparse. Southern right whale dolphins were taken by whaling operations of the 19th century, primarily for their meat. In the past they have been infrequently caught off the coasts of Peru and Chile, where their meat and blubber were used as food and crab bait. High levels of bycaught animals have been recorded in the swordfish (Xiphias gladius) driftnet fishery in northern Chile, which started in the early 1980s, and to a lesser extent, the species has also been incidentally caught in driftnets along the coast of Peru.

Large numbers of southern right whale dolphins are sometimes taken by gillnetting and longline fishing in oceans off the southern coast of Australia. Off the west coast of southern Africa, no evidence exists of bycatch in gillnet fisheries, but there may be competition for forage resources with pelagic trawl fisheries due to the pelagic distribution of the species and their squid based diet. The direct and indirect impacts of global climate change on the southern right whale dolphin are largely unknown, but could have a cascading effect on the movement and feeding ecology. Seismic activity, for oil and gas, might also be a minor threat. No reported attempts to capture live southern right whale dolphins exist.

== Conservation status ==
As of 2018, the Global IUCN Red List classifies the southern right whale dolphin as Least Concern (LC), due to their apparent wide distribution in pelagic waters of the sub-Antarctic and the lack of evidence of severe threats to the populations. However, the species remains extremely data-poor throughout its range so the assessment should be considered provisional until more knowledge is obtained.

The 2016 Regional Red List of Mammals of South Africa, Lesotho and Swaziland also classified the species as Least Concern while in Australia and Chile, based on the limited current knowledge on the species, southern right whale dolphins are classified as Data Deficient by the Action Plan for Australian Mammals and the Chilean Species National List respectively. Under the New Zealand Threat Classification System this species is listed locally as Data Deficient.

Southern right whale dolphins are listed in Appendix II of the Convention on International Trade in Endangered Species (CITES) and the species is subject to International Whaling Commission (IWC) regulations. In South-Africa, the species is protected by the Marine Living Resources Act (No. 18 of 1998). They are included in the Memorandum of Understanding Concerning the Conservation of the Manatee and Small Cetaceans of Western Africa and Macaronesia (Western African Aquatic Mammals MoU) and the Memorandum of Understanding for the Conservation of Cetaceans and Their Habitats in the Pacific Islands Region (Pacific Cetaceans MoU). Within the Australian Whale Sanctuary, all cetaceans, including the southern right whale dolphins are protected under the Environment Protection and Biodiversity Conservation Act (EPBC Act). The Sanctuary includes all Commonwealth waters from the three nautical mile state waters limit out to the boundary of the Australian Exclusive Economic Zone (out to 200 nautical miles and further in some places). The species is also protected within the Indian Ocean Sanctuary and Southern Ocean Sanctuary. Although the species is included in legislation, no specific conservation measures have been identified for this species as throughout its range, there is still a clear deficiency of data to build these measures upon.

== See also ==
- Right whale dolphin
- Northern right whale dolphin
- List of cetaceans
- Marine biology
