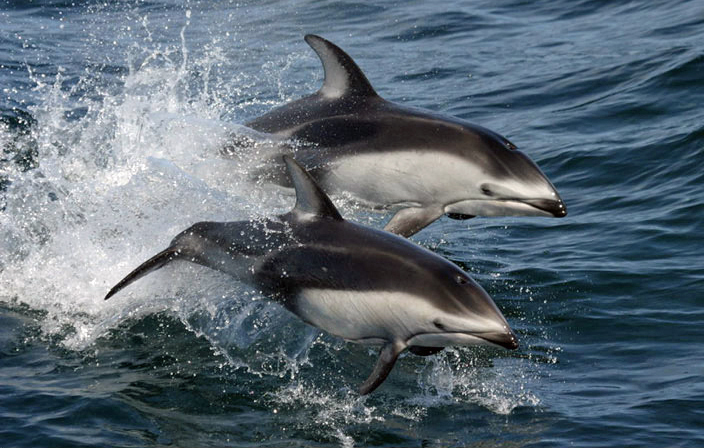

- Size compared to an average human

Conservation status
- Least Concern (IUCN 3.1)
- CITES Appendix II

Scientific classification
- Kingdom: Animalia
- Phylum: Chordata
- Class: Mammalia
- Order: Artiodactyla
- Infraorder: Cetacea
- Family: Delphinidae
- Genus: Aethalodelphis
- Species: A. obliquidens

Binomial name
- Aethalodelphis obliquidens (Gill, 1865)
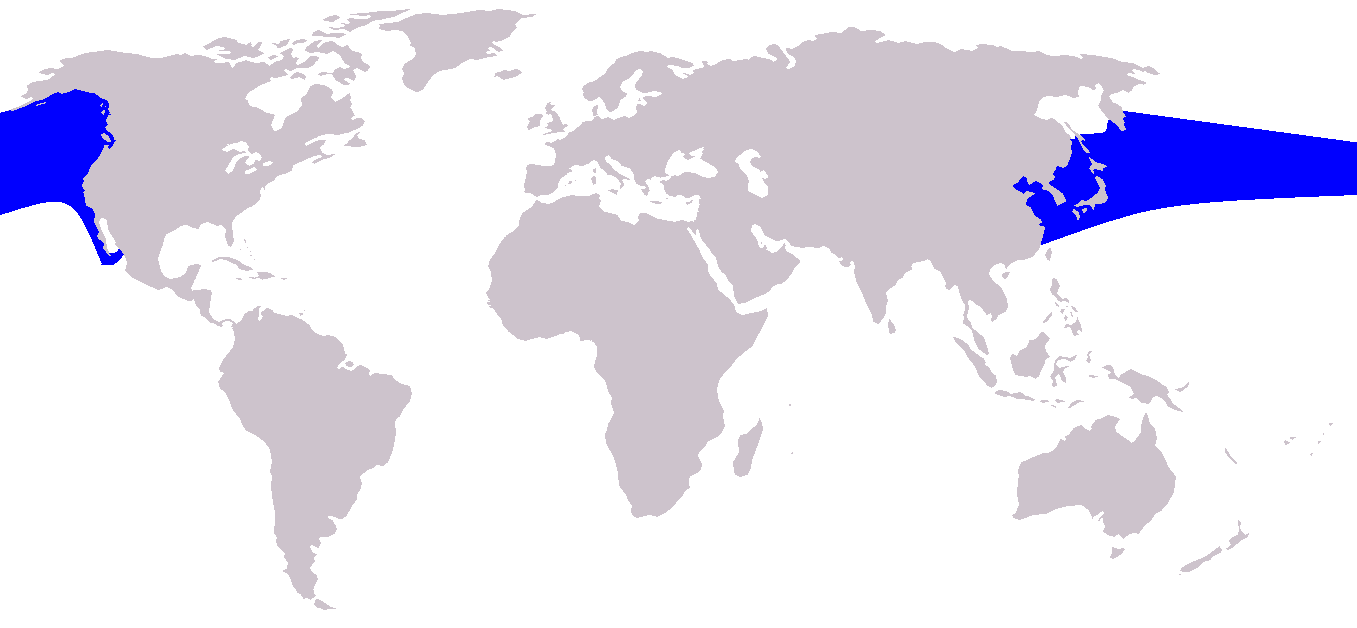
- Pacific white-sided dolphin range

Synonyms
- Lagenorhynchus obliquidens Sagmatias obliquidens

= Pacific white-sided dolphin =

Species of mammal

The Pacific white-sided dolphin (Aethalodelphis obliquidens), also known as the hookfin porpoise, is an active dolphin found in the cool or temperate waters of the North Pacific Ocean.

== Taxonomy ==
The Pacific white-sided dolphin was named by Smithsonian mammalogist Theodore Nicholas Gill in 1865. It is morphologically similar to the dusky dolphin, which is found in the South Pacific. Genetic analysis by Frank Cipriano suggests the two species diverged around two million years ago.

Though traditionally placed in the genus Lagenorhynchus, molecular analyses indicate they are closer to dolphins of the genus Cephalorhynchus, in the Lissodelphininae subfamily, than to both the Atlantic white-sided dolphin and the White-beaked dolphin. It was therefore proposed to move the Pacific white-sided dolphin to the resurrected genus Sagmatias together with other southern hemisphere Lagenorhynchus species (hourglass dolphin, Dusky dolphin and Peale's dolphin). As a result of further taxonomic analysis, in 2025 the Pacific white-sided dolphin and dusky dolphin were reclassified into the new genus Aethalodelphis.

== Description ==
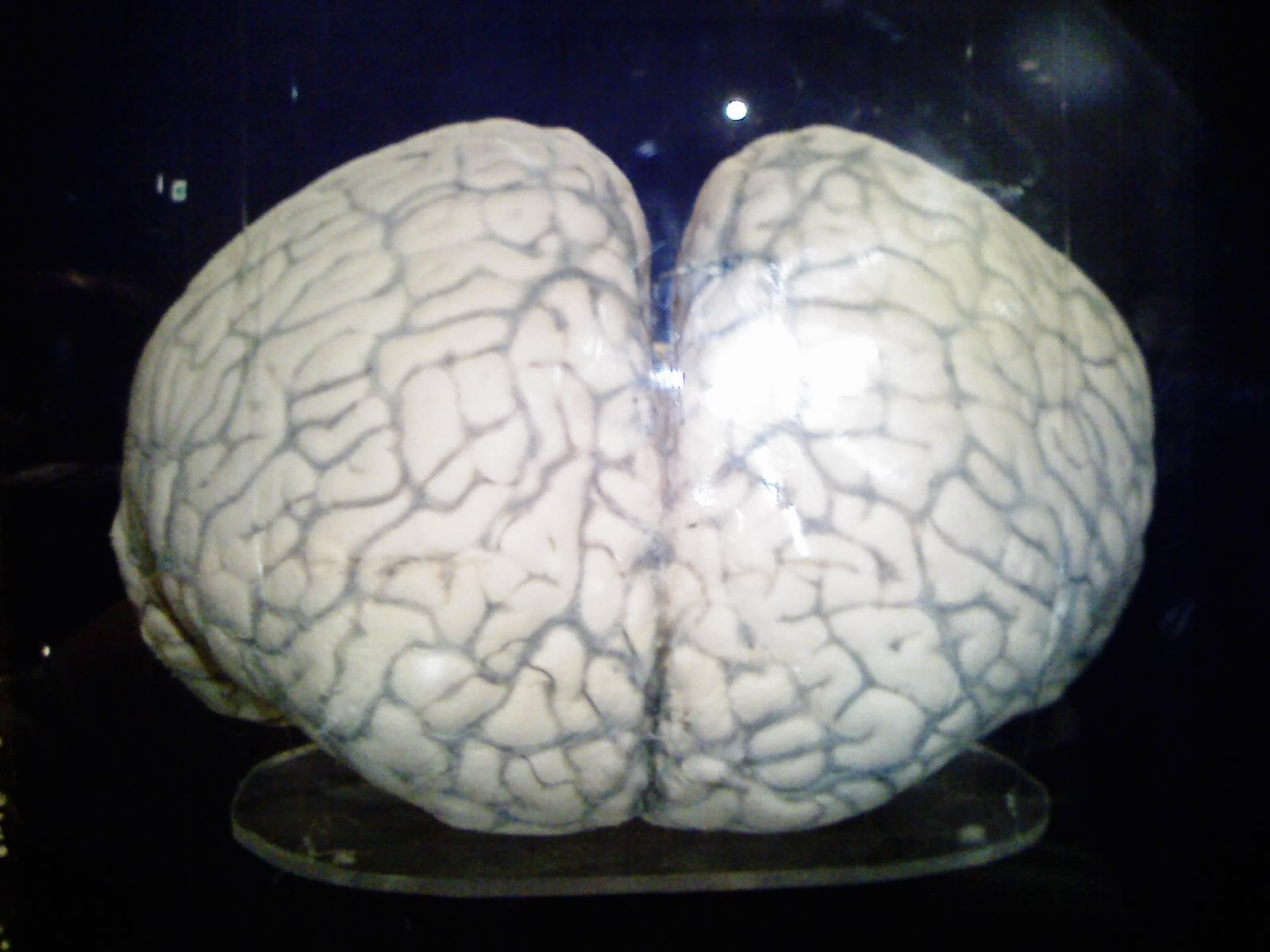
Pacific white-sided dolphin's brain at Okinawa Churaumi Aquarium

The Pacific white-sided dolphin has three colors. The chin, throat and belly are creamy white. The beak, flippers, back, and dorsal fin are a dark gray. Light gray patches are seen on the sides and a further light gray stripe runs from above the eye to below the dorsal fin, where it thickens along the tail stock. A dark gray ring surrounds the eyes.

The species is an average-sized oceanic dolphin. Females weigh up to 150 kg (330 lb) and males 200 kg (440 lb) with males reaching 2.5 m (8.2 ft) and females 2.3 m (7.5 ft) in length. Pacific white-sided dolphins usually tend to be larger than dusky dolphins. Females reach maturity at seven years. From 1990 to 1991, a study conducted by Richard C. Ferrero and William A. Walker revealed the vast majority of Pacific white-sided dolphins that fell victim to the drift nets were between the ages of 8.3 and 11 when they sexually matured. The gestation period usually last for one year. Individuals are believed to live up 40 years or more.

The Pacific white-sided dolphin is extremely active and mixes with many of the other North Pacific cetacean species. It readily approaches boats and bow-rides. Large groups are common, averaging 90 individuals, with supergroups of more than 300. Prey includes mainly hake, anchovies, squid, herring, salmon, and cod.

They have an average of 60 teeth.

== Range and habitat ==
The range of the Pacific white-sided dolphin arcs across the cool to temperate waters of the North Pacific. Sightings go no further south than the South China Sea on the western side and the Baja California Peninsula on the eastern. Populations may also be found in the Sea of Japan and the Sea of Okhotsk. In the northern part of the range, some individuals may be found in the Bering Sea. The dolphins appear to follow some sort of migratory pattern – on the eastern side they are most abundant in the Southern California Bight in winter, but further north (Oregon, Washington) in summer. Their preference for off-shore deep waters appears to be year-round. The only known predator of the Pacific white-sided dolphin is the killer whale, but at least one case of predation by the great white shark has been recorded.

The total population may be as many as 1 million. However, the tendency of Pacific white-sided dolphins to approach boats complicates precise estimates via sampling.

== Behavior ==
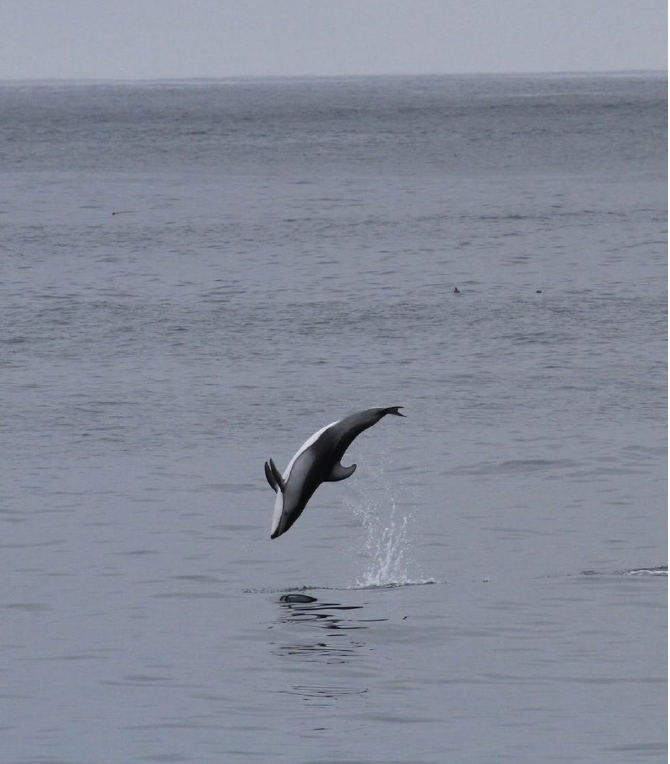
A Pacific white-sided dolphin flips out of the water in the Cordell Bank National Marine Sanctuary off California.

These dolphins keep close company. White-sided dolphins swim in groups of 10 to 100, and can often be seen bow-riding and doing somersaults. Members form a close-knit group and will often care for a sick or injured dolphin. Animals that live in such large social groups develop ways to keep in touch, with each dolphin identifying itself by a unique name-whistle. Young dolphins communicate with a touch of a flipper as they swim beside adults.

Studies conducted on Pacific white-sided dolphins, as well as Risso's dolphin have revealed a multitude of things about how they communicate as a species, which was revealed to be vastly different from bottlenose dolphins and common dolphins. The studies have revealed that their notches and spectral peaks happen to be more low pitched when juxtaposed with the bottlenose dolphins and common dolphins as mentioned earlier. Other studies have revealed similar behaviors. Two studies conducted back in 2010 and 2011 revealed that the vocalizations of Pacific white-sided dolphins can range differently only from their behavioral states, indicating strong similarities between the acoustic and surface behavior for various foraging behaviors, including the possibility of an undescribed subspecies. The oceanographical data in the area can also effect the behavioral patterns of the dolphins. The studies also revealed that the different types of echolocations do vary based on the geographical locations; the first population of Pacific white-sided dolphins that were observed, inhabiting the waters near the Pacific United States seemed to more activity during the night while the second population of Pacific white-sided dolphins, that were also observed, inhabiting areas near Baja California, were observed to be more active during the day, possibly due the seasons and the dolphins' search for prey.

The first sighting of the species on Commander Islands involved a single dolphin to travel along with a pod of killer whales in 2013.

Pacific white-sided dolphins are known to sleep on average seven hours a night.

== Relation to humans ==
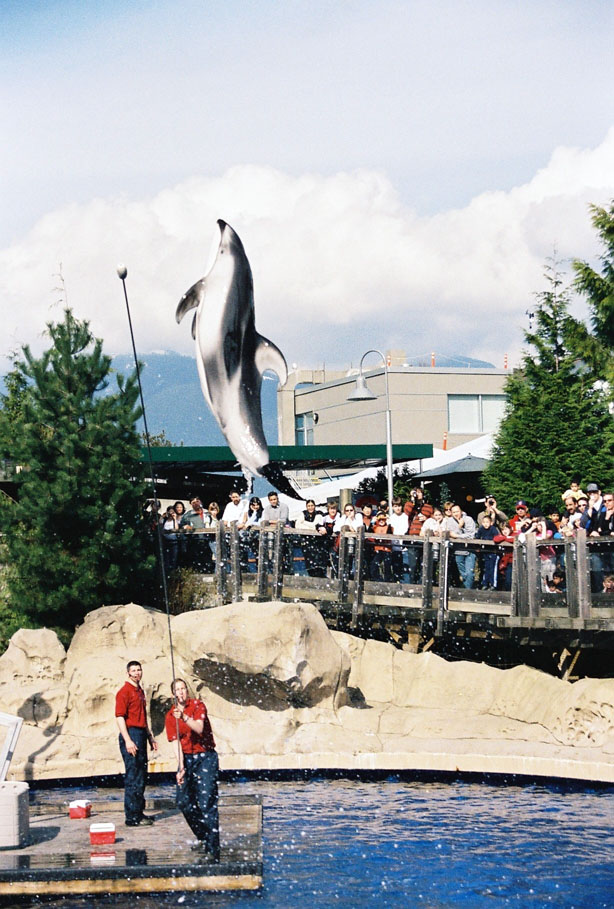
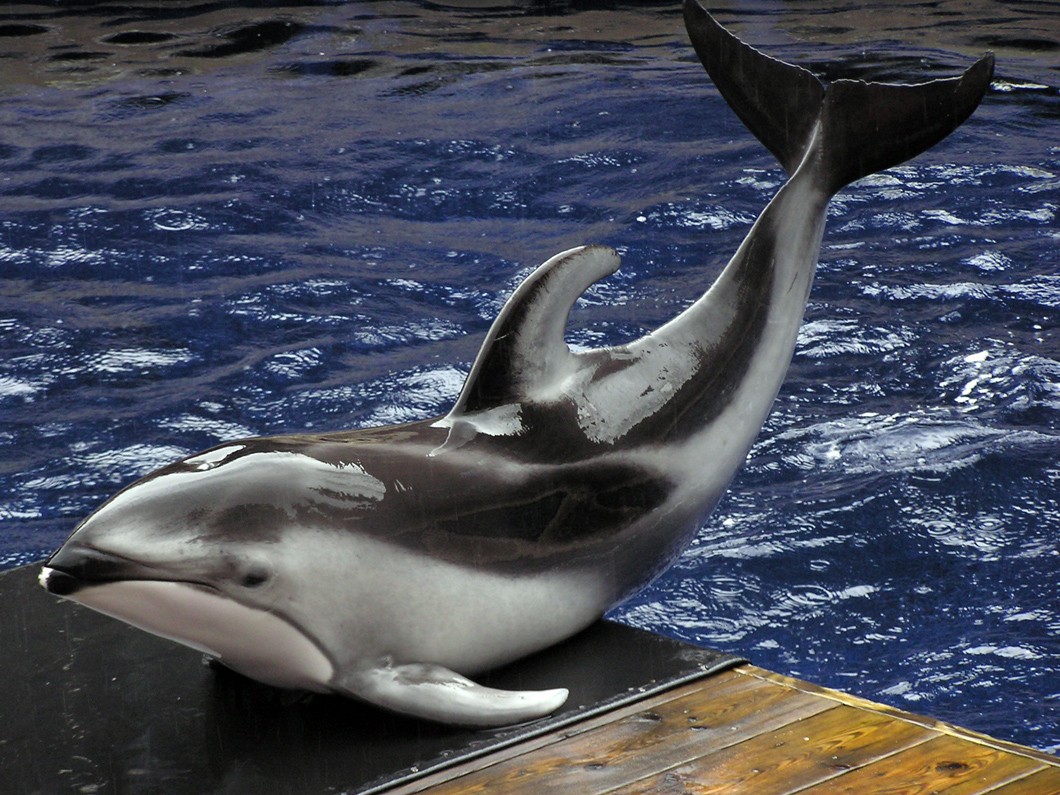
Left: High-jump during Pacific white-sided dolphin show at the Vancouver Aquarium
Right: Pacific white-sided dolphin named Spinnaker at Vancouver Aquarium

=== Protection ===
Until the United Nations banned certain types of large fishing nets in 1933, many Pacific white-sided dolphins were killed in drift nets. Some animals are still killed each year by Japanese hunting drives.

=== Captivity ===
Although overshadowed in popularity by bottlenose dolphins, Pacific white-sided dolphins are also a part of some marine theme park shows. Roughly 100 reside in dolphinaria in North America and Japan. In captivity, they tend to consume less amounts of food when compared to their wild counterparts, this could be the case due to the fact of temperatures changing in the water based on the seasons. However, the condition in which the dolphins lives, most likely in an aquarium tank, will impact how much energy is required for a captive dolphin to thrive in captivity. Studies have also shown that the highest amount of food intake that a captive Pacific white-sided dolphin displays in autumn when the dolphin increase their food intake as well as their body mass.

== See also ==
- List of cetaceans
- Marine biology
